= San Francisco graft trials =

Series of trials in early 1900s San Francisco

The "Big Four" graft prosecutors (left to right): Francis J. Heney, William J. Burns, Fremont Older, and Rudolph Spreckels.

The San Francisco graft trials were a series of attempts from 1905 to 1908 to prosecute public officials in the city of San Francisco, California, for graft and other political corruption. Only one person was convicted and went to prison: the city's main political boss Abe Ruef.

Among those implicated were Mayor Eugene Schmitz, and various members of the San Francisco Board of Supervisors, all of whom had taken bribes from business owners. Ruef was at the center of the corruption; while acting as Schmitz's attorney, he approved all city contracts and received hundreds of thousands of dollars in payment from business owners, keeping a portion for himself and distributing the remainder to the Mayor and Supervisors.

Former mayor James Phelan, along with banker Rudolph Spreckels and editor Fremont Older of the San Francisco Evening Bulletin, asked United States District Attorney Francis Heney, fresh from a successful stint as special assistant to the U.S. Attorney General's office in prosecuting the Oregon land fraud scandal, to help put an end to the corruption. Heney charged Ruef and Schmitz with numerous counts of bribery and brought them to trial. Heney rejected a juror because he was an ex-con and publicly accused Ruef of trying to plant him on the jury. During the trial, the rejected juror shot Heney in the face, but Heney survived. The juror was found dead in jail the next morning, and many suspected Ruef and his allies of complicity in his death. Some members of the public thought that Sheriff William Biggy was negligent, and when he fell off a boat late one night and drowned, some thought it may have been suicide, but others thought he may have been murdered.

Ruef's trial was eventually brought to a successful close by Special Assistant District Attorney (and future California Governor and U.S. Senator) Hiram Johnson, and after several appeals, Ruef served four years in San Quentin Prison. While there, he wrote a series of tell-all columns for Older's Bulletin newspaper implicating a number of companies, executives, and public officials. Mayor Schmitz was found guilty, jailed, and then released and retried, but did not serve any time. All of the business owners and supervisors implicated received immunity for their testimony about Ruef's and Schmitz's complicity and were not arrested or charged. When a new District Attorney, Charles Fickert, was elected, he stopped the investigations and all further prosecutions.

== Background ==
During the first decade of the 20th century in the United States, employers supported an open shop movement and were decidedly anti-union. They were able to obtain government support to prevent workers from organizing. California was a center of corruption at the time, indirectly influenced by the Southern Pacific Railroad which had exerted a large degree of control over California politics for many years. This is evidenced by the refusal of Stephen T. Gage, one of the directors of the Southern Pacific Railway, and Richard Chute, a salaried employee of the same company, to obey a summons from the 1891 Wallace Grand Jury until compelled by the California State Supreme Court.

These companies and other well-funded interest groups and individuals used their economic power and influence to form trusts and monopolies that guaranteed them power. Many of these wealthy and powerful people lived in San Francisco, the largest port on the West Coast, and when necessary could reinforce their hold on power through corrupt politicians and city bosses.

=== Powerful unions ===
In the spring of 1901, San Francisco employers made a decision to try to push back gains made by the trade unions during the previous two years. They formed a secret employers' association. Its bylaws stipulated that no member could settle a strike by a union without permission from the executive committee.

== Beginning of strike ==
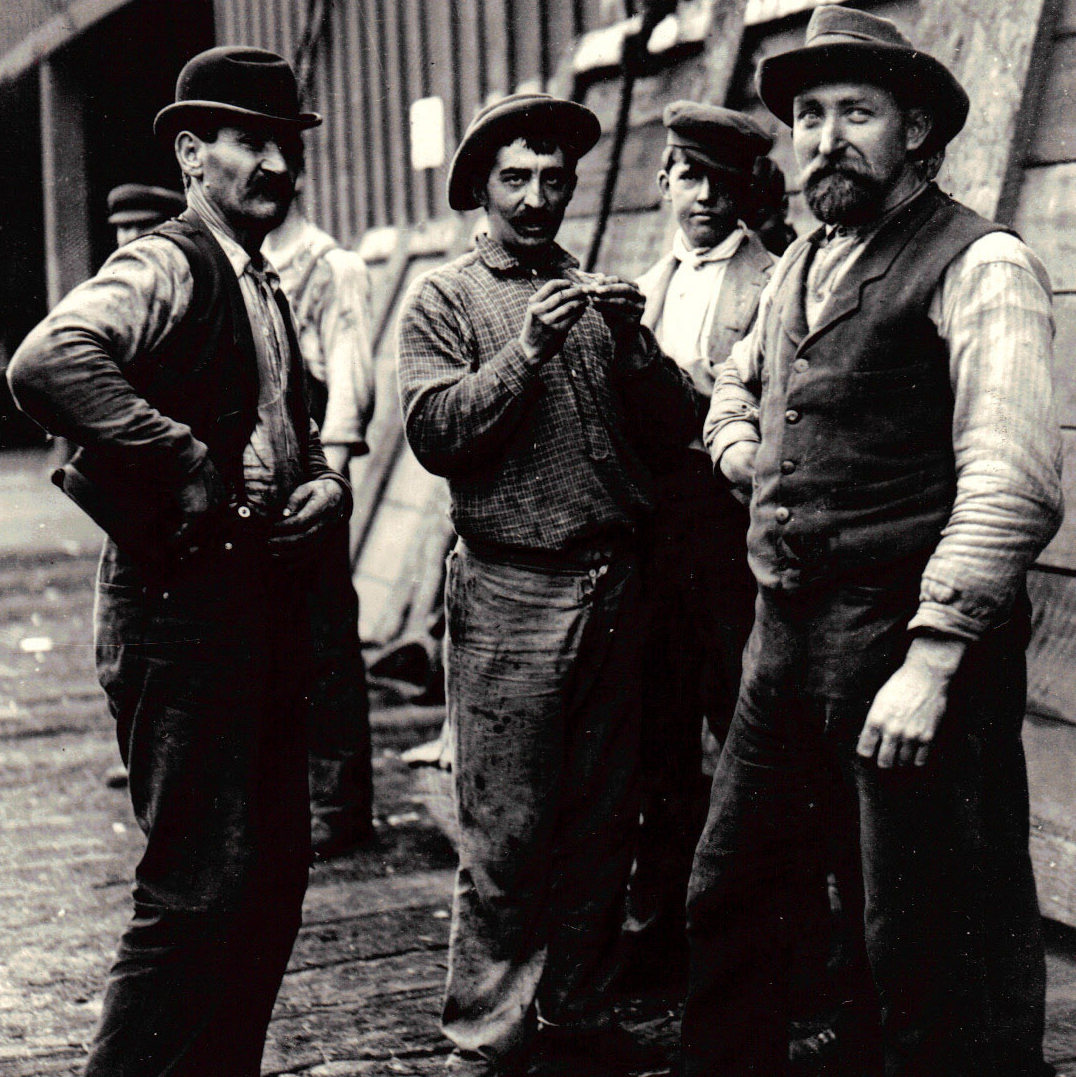
Workers on the San Francisco waterfront in 1901.

On May 1, 6,000 of the Cooks' and Waiters' Union walked out, demanding one day off per week, a ten-hour work day, and a union shop in all city restaurants. They were joined by the Carriage Makers union and journeymen butchers, and on May 20, the International Association of Machinists announced a nationwide strike.

To counter the success of the unions, the secret Employers' Association hired an attorney, M.F. Michael, who was initially their sole visible face. He announced in an interview published on May 10, 1901, that the employers were unalterably opposed to a closed shop and they would not negotiate that point. The Employers' Association received up to $500,000 in anonymous donations and used their financial muscle to threaten to cut off supplies to anyone who broke ranks.

The contract for handling the baggage for attendees of a national convention of the Epworth League in San Francisco was given to a non-union company. During the prior year, a union company was hired during another convention in San Francisco to handle the baggage, but many attendees did not receive their luggage until they were ready to leave town. Tens of thousands of attendees were projected to attend, and the Drayman's Association was hoping to avoid a similarly embarrassing episode. However, the non-union company given the contract was unable to fulfill its obligations and sought the assistance of firm controlled by the newly organized Brotherhood of Teamsters. The union refused to work on a job with non-union men. In response, the Draymen's Association, under pressure from the Employers' Association, locked out the city's unionized teamsters on July 21. They were hoping to break the power of the teamsters' union.

Fearing that the teamsters' union would be crushed, the San Francisco Labor Council directed the City Front Federation, led by its President Andrew Furuseth and made up of the city's 14 maritime unions, including the Sailor's Union of the Pacific and the longshoremen's unions, to strike in support of the locked out teamsters. A total of about 16,000 longshoremen, clerks, packers, and warehouse workers on both sides of San Francisco Bay joined the work stoppage, further increasing the tense situation. The lockout spread to the entire waterfront, which shut down much of the Bay Area's transportation and as a result most commerce.

=== Mayor arms strikebreakers ===
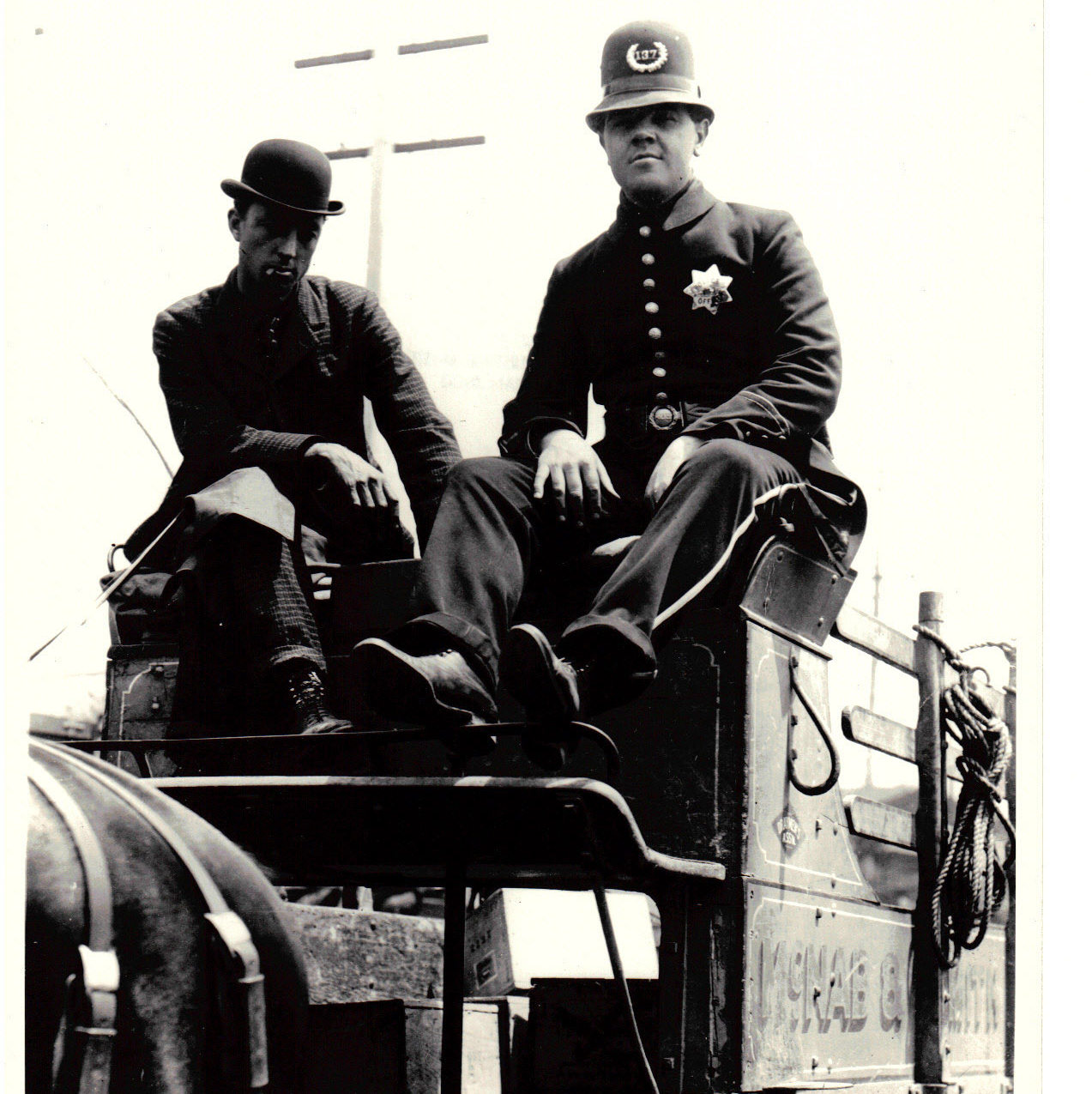
A strikebreaking teamster is escorted by a San Francisco policeman during the strike of 1901. On the side of the wagon is the name of the company, McNab & Smith.

Both sides refused to compromise on their stance for a closed or an open shop. Both accused the other of conspiracy and aggressive tactics, further aggravating tensions and confusing the public. During July, regional produce was ready to be shipped, and the employers hired strikebreakers. Democratic Mayor James D. Phelan, who had served three consecutive terms, designated the employers' strikebreakers as "special deputies", allowing them to wear badges, bear arms, and carry clubs, and told the police to protect the strikebreakers. Farmers grew frustrated when their wheat stood on the docks and began to load and move their own crops. Former Army teamsters, returning from the war in the Philippines, gladly filled the available strikebreaking jobs, and university students from the University of California took jobs.

The employers' strikebreakers were met by the unions with force and the employers called for police intervention. The strikers threw rocks at the strikebreakers and marbles under the feet of the horses pulling the carts. The mayor's actions did nothing to stop the violence and inflamed the union leadership. They accused the strikebreakers of routine brutality and violence. Mayor Phelan had been elected in large measure due to the support of organized labor but now he sided with the employers. At a meeting in his office, he refused to withdraw the policemen from the waterfront. In anger, labor attendees falsely reported that Phelan told them, "If you don't want to be clubbed, get back to work." His attitude further enraged the labor leadership.

=== Strike broken ===
On September 29, after four months of strikes and increased violence, a bloody riot and gun battle broke out on Kearny Street in broad daylight. The employers' strikebreakers attacked the union blockade. Picketing workers were clubbed, five workers were shot and killed, and 336 were injured. Hundreds more were arrested and the strike was broken. On October 3, California Governor Henry T. Gage stepped in and threatened all parties with the imposition of martial law. He convened a meeting of the Drayman's Association and the Teamsters Union, eliminating the employers association. The terms of the settlement were never made public, but the result was that the employers were able to retain an open shop, though they could not exclude members of the union. The employers' association, flush with success, soon disbanded.

== Union Labor Party formed ==
Anticipating defeat, on September 5, 1901, about 300 delegates representing 68 of San Francisco's unions met at a convention and established the Union Labor Party of the City and County of San Francisco. The convention approved a platform including a call for the revision of the city charter to curb future intervention by the city administration in labor disputes, a demand for municipal ownership of all public utilities, building more schools, promoting teachers based on merit, and ending the poll tax. The platform also contained a nativist demand that called for restricting Asian immigration and creating racially segregated schools for Asian children. Some organized labor, including the State Building Trades Council led by P. H. McCarthy, refused to join the new labor party.

=== Ruef backs mayoral candidate ===
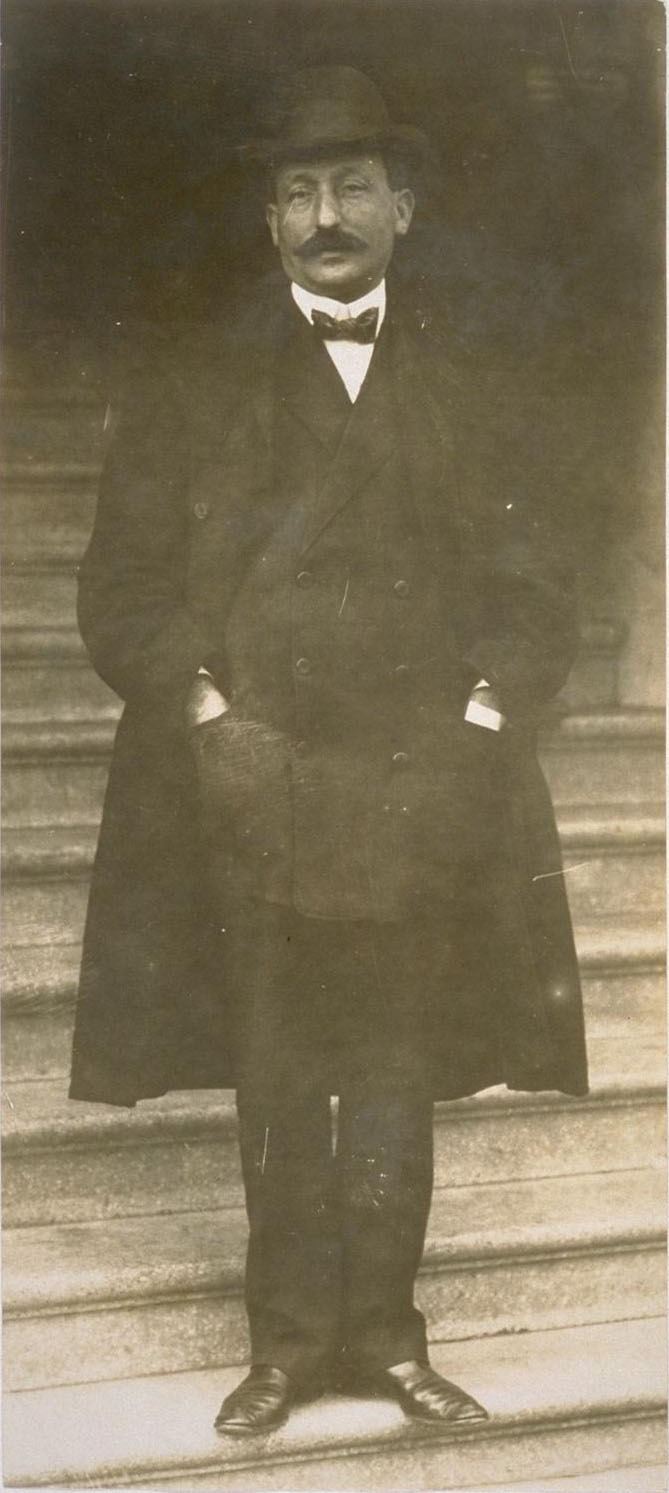
Attorney Abe Ruef, who was the political boss behind the graft at the center of the prosecution.

Abe Ruef was a Republican for a number of years when it was generally seen as the party of the Southern Pacific Railroad and its allies. Ruef patiently built a patronage empire over several years. He methodically sought out neighborhood associations, ethnic clubs, and other civic groups, supporting them with contributions and payments, and providing services like leniency from a local judge and quick approval of a business license. Ruef competed with Michael Casey, president of the Teamsters Union, for control of the union, but eventually ceded the contest, but not his influence, to Casey. Union local Eugene Schmitz played the violin, conducted the orchestra at the Columbia Theatre on Powell Street in San Francisco, and was president of the Musician's union local. He and Ruef had been friends for 15 years. When the Union Labor Party sought a candidate for mayor, Ruef contributed $16,000 (about $573,000 in 2025) to Schmitz's campaign and used his considerable influence to make sure Schmitz was selected to front for the new Union Labor Party. Ruef wrote the Union Labor Party's platform and built a strong, behind-the-scenes network of supporters, including the more than 1,000 saloon keepers and another 1,000 bartenders in San Francisco, who all influenced political discussions in their saloons.

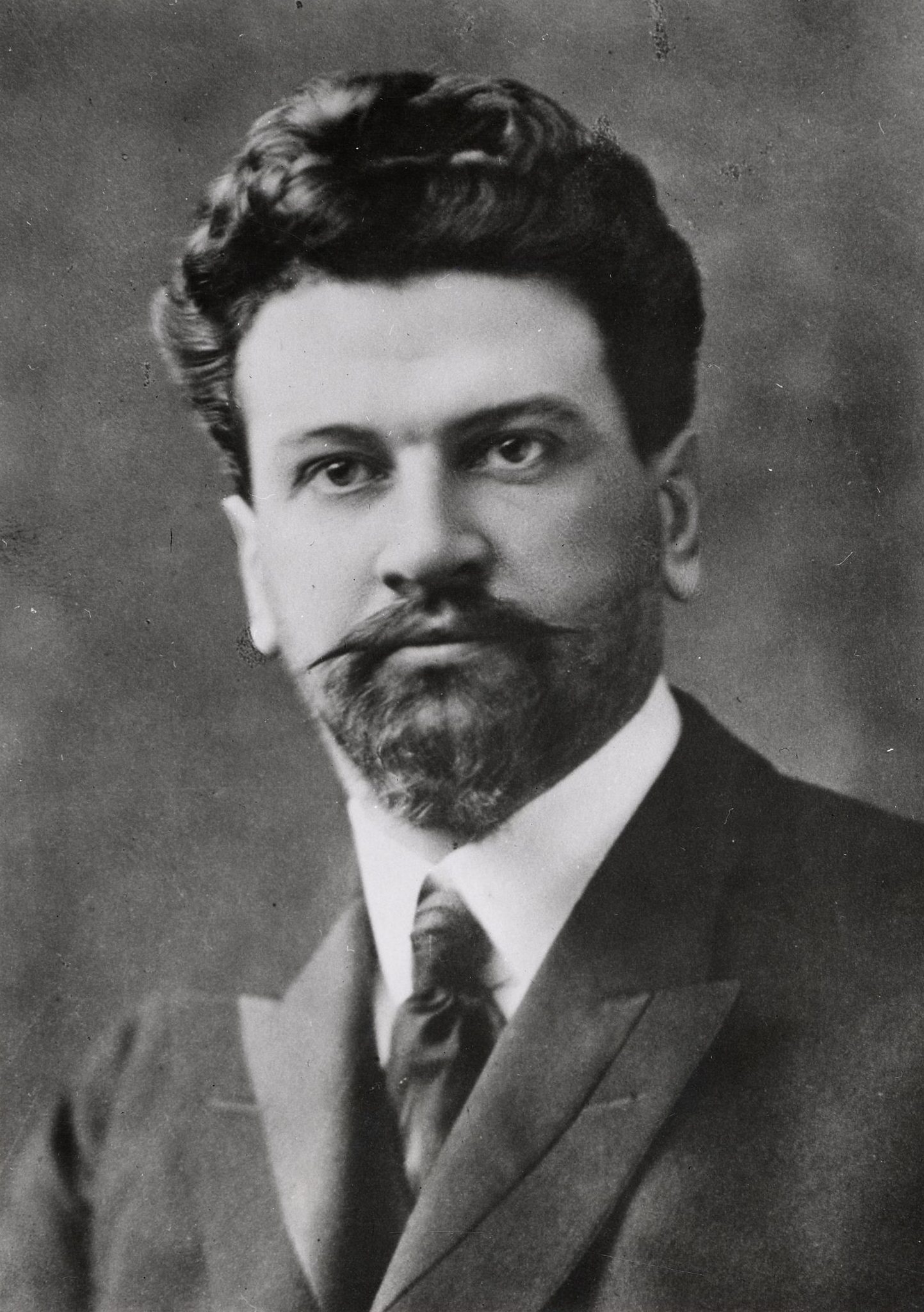
Musician's Union President Eugene Schmitz, who succeeded James D. Phelan as mayor of San Francisco.

Once the strike was concluded, Mayor Phelan found he had no friends and was forced to drop out of the race. The Republicans nominated Asa R. Wells and the Democrats chose Joseph A. Tobin. The local citizens supported the Union Labor Party because they felt it was more sensitive to their needs even though the elected officials were enormously corrupt, and Schmitz was narrowly elected on November 5, 1901, winning 21,776 of the 53,493 votes cast; the Republicans and Democrats split the remainder, allowing Schmitz to take office. Although the labor party only won three of the Board of Supervisors' seats, they managed to control many of the city commissions due to appointments made by the mayor. With union control of the mayor's office, San Francisco became the first union-run city in the United States.

=== Ruef controls city contracts ===
Schmitz was less corrupt than the mayors who preceded him, but he had to deal with Ruef, who operated from his offices at California and Kearney Streets. He wrote most of the mayor's official papers and conducted an ongoing series of meetings with Mayor Schmitz, city commissioners, officials, seekers of favors or jobs, and others. Officially an unpaid attorney for the mayor's office, he was the power behind the mayor's chair.

The first company to seek his advice was the Theodore Halsey, a confidential political agent for the Pacific States Telephone and Telegraph Company. He paid Ruef a retainer of $1,250 (about $48,000 in 2025) a month for "advice" on municipal issues. After the graft prosecutions, E.F. Pillsbury, General Counsel for the telephone company, revealed that he had never heard of Ruef's employment, and would have objected to Ruef receiving compensation greater than his own $1,000 per month.

Many others followed suit, hiring him even when they had no need for his legal services. Company's payments to Ruef varied depending on the favor wanted, from a few thousand to hundreds of thousands of dollars. If you wanted a city permit or contract, you had to go through one man, Ruef.

James L. Gallagher, Ruef's ally on the San Francisco Board of Supervisors.

Ruef pocketed half and passed the balance to the Mayor and his ally on the Board of Supervisors, James L. Gallagher. Gallagher then divided the amount he received among their loyal Supervisors. When a decision needed to be made, Ruef would meet with the Supervisors privately beforehand and even suggest statements they might make to give the appearance of independent action. Schmitz ran for re-election in 1903 although the Union Labor Party still failed to win a majority of the Board of Supervisors.

=== Supervisors seek payoffs ===
Among the cases of graft was the Pacific Gas & Electric Company, who had completed consolidating the gas, light and power companies in San Francisco and in all of central California into a single entity. Frank G. Drum, one of the new company's largest stockholders, paid Ruef a confidential retainer of $1,000 a month. The Board of Supervisors, all members of the Union Labor Party, had before the election called for rolling the gas rate from $1.00 per 1000 cubic feet back to 75¢. On April 2, shortly before the Supervisors were to vote on the rate change, a fire destroyed a major electrical substation at 22nd Ave. and Georgia St. Ruef decided to seek an 85¢ rate, but several Supervisors wanted additional reasons to support the change. Ruef asked Drum for $20,000, which Drum delivered soon afterward in cash. The Supervisors approved an 85 cent gas rate, though some voted against the proposal.

Another instance was a group of investors led by William H. Crocker, son of Big Four Charles Crocker and president of The Crocker Bank. They organized the Parkside Realty Co. in July, 1905, and assembled a 400 acres (160 ha) parcel of land on the western edge of the city, five blocks across and 20 blocks long, stretching to within a block and a half of the Pacific Ocean. Before they could begin building homes, they needed approval for a streetcar franchise. They wanted to build a mile-long streetcar line that connected to the existing United Railroad's line on the south side of Golden Gate Park. The extension would allow residents of the future subdivision to easily travel to the city center.

The Parkside Realty Co. was unable to persuade the Supervisors to support their streetcar project. The Supervisors wanted their cut, and the company finally held a secret banquet, not publicly revealed until 1910, to seek the supervisors' support. Supervisor Dr. Charles Boxton asked, "How much money is in it for us?" The investors agreed to pay Ruef $30,000 (about $1,075,000 in 2025) for two years. The Supervisors approved the requested trolley franchise, although Ruef never passed any funds to the supervisors. The remaining payment was later halted by the graft prosecution, and only $15,000 was ever handed over.

By about 1900, half of the streetcar lines in San Francisco had been converted to overhead trolley routes, but a great many favored placing the power lines in underground conduits which was considerably more expensive. Eastern investors led by Patrick Calhoun took over the system, inheriting a number of lines built by a variety of competing companies over many years. In 1900, the system had 234 miles (377 km) of track, 56 miles (90 km) of cable, 166 miles (267 km) of overhead trolley, 4 miles (6.4 km) for horse cars, and 8 miles (13 km) of ancient steam railroad. United Railroad was dead set against paying for underground conduit.

In 1902, Tirey L. Ford, who was the Attorney General of the State of California, began making regular, secret payments for United Railroads to Abe Ruef to act as their special consulting attorney. On September 15, 1902, Ford resigned as Attorney General and accepted the position of General Counsel to United Railroads. Ford was found to be innocent by a San Francisco jury and by the District Court of Appeals Judge William P. Lawlor.

== Leading citizens seek help ==
Rudolph Spreckels, financial backer of the graft prosecution.

The ongoing corruption began to affect the quality of public services, and citizens began to seek reform. A Grand Jury was convened, and began to take testimony about extent of the graft. Former Mayor Phelan, in concert with Rudolph Spreckels, president of the San Francisco First National Bank, and Fremont Older, editor of the San Francisco Bulletin, decided to try to challenge the Labor Party's corrupt choke-hold on city politics and commerce. Phelan and Spreckels were among the largest property-owners in San Francisco.

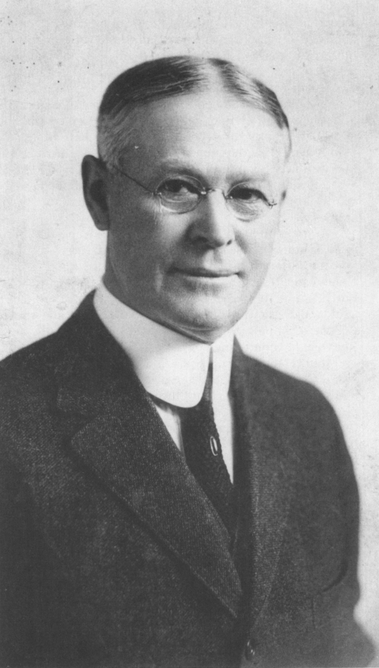
U.S. District Attorney Francis J. Heney, who was asked by leading businessmen to help end the corruption.

They approached Francis Heney, who as Special Assistant to the U.S. Attorney General's office, had just concluded a successful prosecution of corrupt government officials in the Oregon land fraud scandal. Heney came to San Francisco and in one of his first public statements, made a speech on November 5, 1905, the day before the election. He said, "If I had control of the District Attorney's office, I would indict Abe Ruef for felony and send him to the penitentiary, where he belongs, for I have personal knowledge that he is corrupt." Ruef didn't sit still for Heney's allegations, and responded in the newspaper two days later. "In making the statement that you personally know that I am corrupt you lied. You cannot personally know that which does not exist. ... You show the same courage which put a bullet into the body of Dr. John C. Handy of Tucson, Ariz. in 1891, for whose killing you were indicted for murder, and upon trial were acquitted because you were the only witness to the deed."

=== 1905 election ===
In 1905, the labor party was heavily opposed by the three local newspapers and a united Republican-Democrat combined ticket who had united to defeat the union party. On November 7, Schmitz was re-elected and the union gained complete control of the Board of Supervisors. Of the 80,000 registered voters, only 68,878 voted for mayor and of those, 40,191 voted for Schmitz. Members of the Board of Supervisors had no prior political experience. L.A. Rea had been in the decorating business; W.W. Sanderson had been a well-placed executive in the grocery business; Samuel Davis was a drummer; Edward Walsh a foreman in a shoe factory; C.J. Harrington and Patrick McCusshin had both been saloon-keepers; Jennings Phillips, a sprinter; F.P. Nicholas, a carpenter and former Carpenter's union president; James Kelley, a piano finisher and polisher; Max Manlock, an electrician; Thomas Longergan, a baker; Charles Dexter, a dentist; Michael Coffey, a hack driver; Daniel Coleman, a clerk with a wallpaper dealer; John J. Purri, a blacksmith; and Gallagher was a lawyer. Ruef had effective control over every branch and department in San Francisco.

After the 1905 election, Ruef conducted a private, weekly caucus on Sunday, the night before the Board of Supervisors meetings, for members of the board, Mayor Schmitz, and the board's clerk and Ruef's protege and former law clerk, George B. Keane. Ruef ran the meetings and Keane took notes as they discussed matters to come before the board. Ruef assembled a list of members to serve on the various board committees which were implemented almost without changes. Ruef directed them to meet with him first before they held any other public meetings. There was only one weak link in Ruef's complete domination of the city administration, and that was the new District Attorney William H. Langdon, who had been Superintendent of Schools for three years. During the election, Langdon repeatedly promised, "The laws are on the statute books. I pledge myself to the enforcement of those laws," but few paid much attention to his statements. Ruef thought Langdon would help reach the teachers and students.

Older's newspaper, the Bulletin, which had been Ruef's most vociferous opponent, suffered greatly after the election. Ruef had promised to break the newspaper with libel suits, but he resorted to more crude methods. The newspaper's manager was assaulted and beaten, as were carriers and agents. The newsboys were organized into a union who promptly went out on strike. Deliveries to stores were interrupted or followed by stones through the windows. The police did nothing. Older met with Heney in Washington D.C., and persuaded him to come to San Francisco and meet with Spreckels and himself.

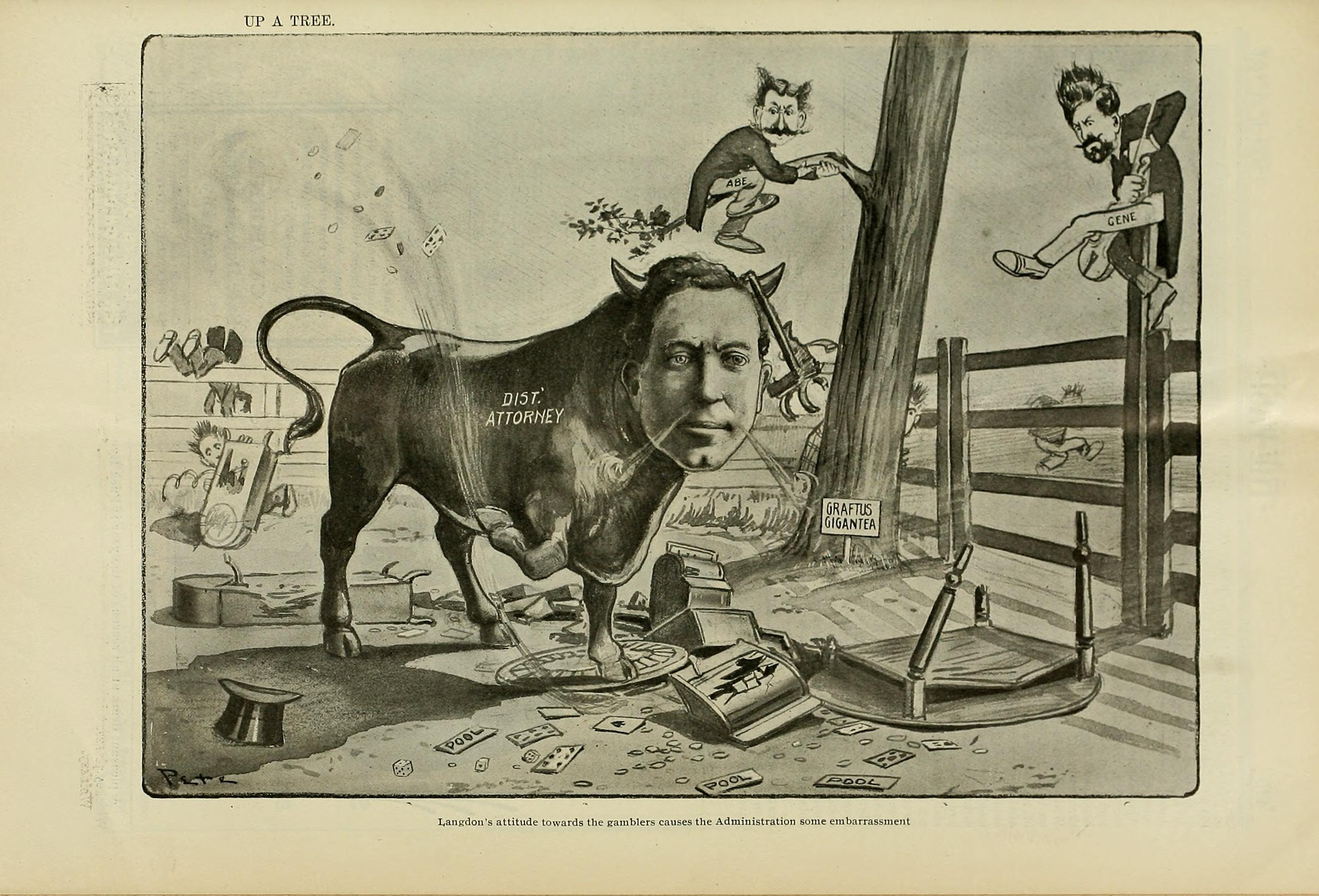
"Up A Tree," a political cartoon published in The Wasp depicting Langdon's raids on the city's gambling dens, March 24, 1906

In February 1906, Langdon astonished many in the labor party and city politics when he initiated a raid on gambling dens across the city. The underworld running the games expected to be raided and closed down before an election, not afterward, and the exact opposite had taken place in San Francisco. They felt they had paid protection money under false pretenses. Ruef was unable to persuade Langdon to desist. A few honest citizens began to believe the Ruef's ironclad grip on city politics could be broken.

During the meeting in March, 1906, Spreckels and Older each promised to give $5,000 to support his efforts, and to raise another $90,000 to finance his efforts. When Heney expressed interest, Older went to Washington, D. C. and persuaded President Roosevelt to loan special federal prosecutor Heney to the San Francisco District Attorneys office. Roosevelt agreed. In that meeting Heney offered to accept as his fee whatever was left out of the initial $100,000 fund, stating "But I don't there will be anything left and I will put up my time against your money." In the end, Heney didn't receive any compensation for his work, and in fact gave up lucrative legal work to stay with the prosecution.

On March 10, the Board of Supervisors granted the Home Telegraph Company a 50-year exclusive franchise to provide phone dial service to San Francisco, an act that brought immediate condemnation from the San Francisco Examiner. They reminded the board in an editorial that their election platform had included the city acquiring its own telephone system. The Examiner wrote that the board "should clear the record of the SUSPICIOUS CIRCUMSTANCES that surround the vote on the matter."

=== Railroad franchise bribery ===
By the time of the November, 1905 election, the United Railroad was embroiled in a bitter fight with Rudolph Spreckels and James Phelan who resisted overhead trolly lines along Sutter Street where they owned property. Calhoun tried to buy their support by promising more parks and improvements along the Golden Gate Park Panhandle, where ex-Mayor Phelan owned a great deal of property, but both men continued to oppose the overhead trolley plan and insist on more expensive underground conduits. They believed the overhead lines would be noisy, unsightly, and a fire hazard. He and others felt that San Francisco, like Washington D.C. and New York, merited an underground system.

Ford, representing Calhoun and United Railroad, upped is monthly retainer to Ruef from $500 to $1000 (about $18,000 to $36,000 in 2025) after the 1905 election, and the two sides finally agreed on a deal that called for the company to pay for ornamental street poles and the electric lights along their trolley routes.

A majority of the local citizens and community improvement associations also preferred undergrounding the trolley car power lines, supported by Municipal engineers who had visited several east coast cities and concluded that an underground conduit was more favorable than overhead trolley lines. The railroad resisted, publicly stating that the believed the conduits would fill with water. When Spreckels offered to pay for the cost of draining an underground conduit for a test period to prove it was feasible, Calhoun, President, and George P. Chapman, General Manager of the United Railroads, refused. Calhoun even offered to pay what he estimated to be the cost difference the underground and overhead systems to the city for any purpose they desired.

United Railroads was actually resistant to the upfront cost for undergrounding the power lines, more than twice that of the overhead system, which would take much longer to recover from operating income. Ford offered Ruef an additional $50,000 fee that Ruef turned down, insisting on a larger payment. They ultimately agreed on a $200,000 fee to be paid when work was complete, which meant that the supervisors approved their trolly route with overhead trolly lines. To bring further pressure on Calhoun, James Phelan, George Whittell, Rudolph Spreckels, his father Claus Spreckels, and Charles S. Wheeler filed papers on April 17, 1906, to incorporate the Municipal Street Railways of San Francisco, in order to prove that underground conduits were economical and superior, and to bring pressure to bear on Calhoun to give up his resistance to undergrounding the electrical lines. Their actions generated immediate public support. Calhoun finally proposed to submit the issue to a referendum vote by the people, but it turned out he meant the Board of Supervisors, whose vote Calhoun knew he could count on. He wrote a letter saying that he would submit the matter "to the proper authorities of the city" was resented by the San Francisco Chronicle, who condemned it as breathing "the spirit of insolence" and containing "ill-concealed menace."

=== Earthquake slows prosecution ===
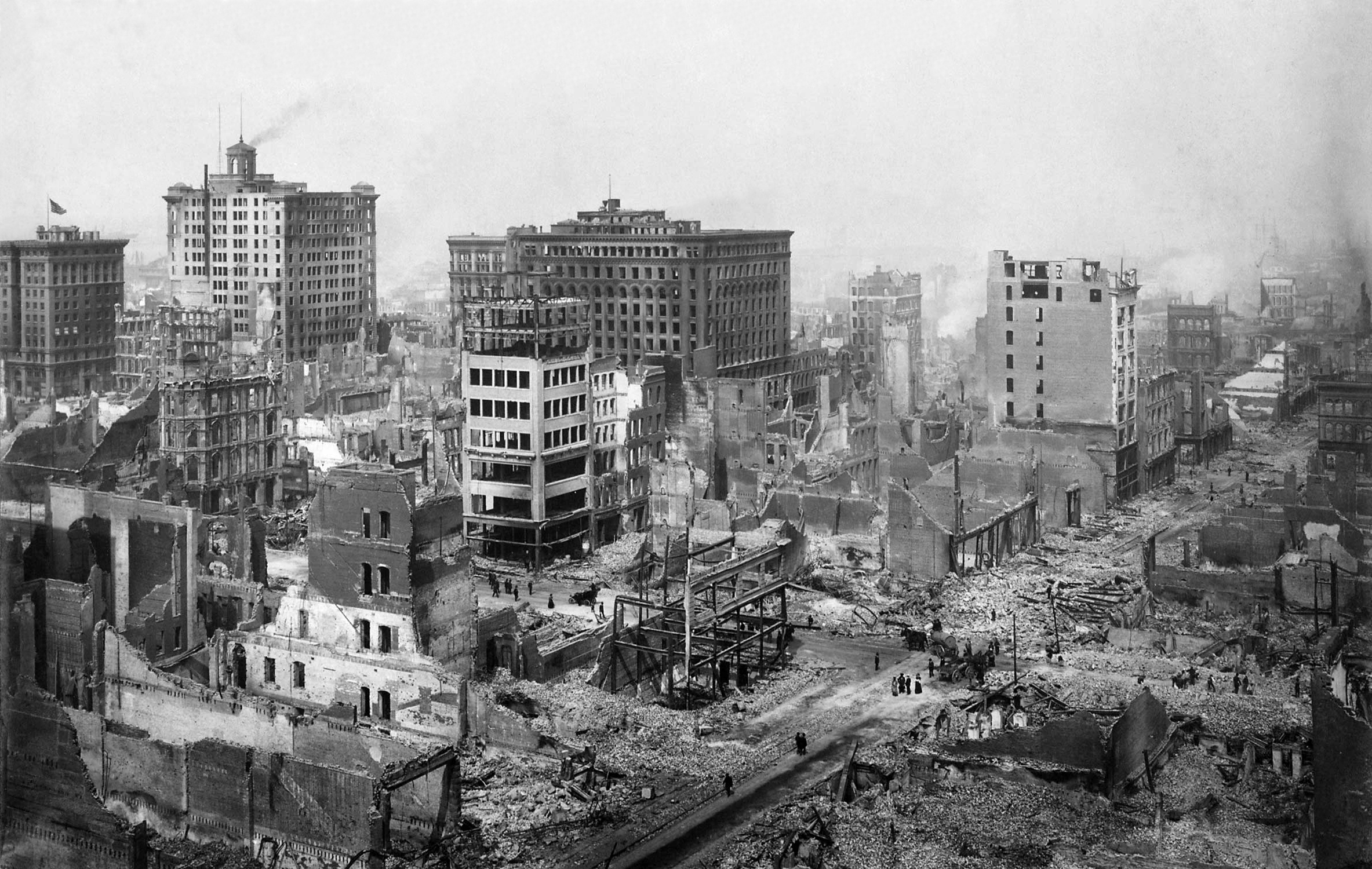
Damage from the San Francisco earthquake slowed the prosecution for a few months.

On April 18, 1906, the city was struck by a massive earthquake, and fires burned for four days, destroying 80 percent of the city. Mayor Schmitz formed an extra-legal Committee of Fifty that was tasked with managing the city during the crisis that followed, which delayed the graft prosecution for a short time. Four days later, crews from the United Railroad began stringing temporary overhead trolley wires on Market St., but did not repair the cable traction system in the street.

=== Committee of Fifty established ===
On the day of the earthquake, Wednesday, April 18, Mayor Schmitz invited a cross section of the city's most prominent businessmen, politicians, civic leaders, entrepreneurs, newspaper men and politicians, but none of the members of the Board of Supervisors or Abraham Ruef, to form the Committee of Fifty to help him manage the crisis. Members of the Committee included individuals that would later be indicted for graft, including Abe Ruef and Tirey L. Ford.

The committee was also referred to as Committee of Safety, Citizens' Committee of Fifty, or Relief and Restoration Committee of Law and Order. It first assembled the afternoon of the earthquake in the basement of the ruined Hall of Justice at 3 p.m. It was forced by the approaching fire to abandon the location and moved across Portsmouth Square to the Plaza Hotel. They had to abandon that location only two hours later. At 8 p.m. the Committee assembled at the Fairmont Hotel's ballroom, sitting along the edge of the stage and on packing cases. At this point, they set up 19 subcommittees, and shortly after 11 p.m., they dispersed.

The Fairmont Hotel burned down that night, and on Thursday, April 19, the Committee met at 6 a.m. at the North End police station. Once again, the spreading fires forced them to move, and the group reconvened at 2 p.m. at Franklin Hall, which became known as Temporary City Hall. Abe Ruef appeared At 4:30 p.m. and although he had not been called as a member, he offered his services, which Mayor Schmitz accepted. Ruef became chairman of an additional sub-committee, trying unsuccessfully to relocate the Chinese to the margins of the city.

Until the earthquake struck, San Francisco was the most prominent and prosperous city in the state. Funds cleared through San Francisco banks increased 80 percent between 1900 and 1905. The city had grown from 342,782 in 1900 to an estimated 500,000 by 1906. San Francisco was one of the most promising places for investment in all of the United States. Many companies were vying for a piece of the money to be made. The Home Telephone Company financed by investors from Southern California and Ohio was trying to wrest the telephone franchise held exclusively by Pacific States Telephone and Telegraph Company. The Spring Valley Water Company, backed by Ruef, successfully blocked consideration of Hetch Hetchy as a source of water for the growing city. Ruef believed he and the city administrators stood to receive as much as $1,000,000 from the Spring Valley deal.

On May 14, 1906, Supervisors gave United Railroads permission to string overhead trolley wires on Market St. The next day the Examiner accused United Railroads of exploiting the disaster to push through its overhead trolley franchise. Mayor Schmitz said the approval was only temporary, but that did not prove to be true. Supervisor Gallagher later testified during Ruef's trial that he told Ruef that board members would accept $4,000 as payment to approve the overhead trolley lines. United Railroads proceeded to install overhead power on all of its lines, even those cable car lines that were still operational after the earthquake and fire, without paying anything to the city for its franchise. The Home Telephone Company contributed $75,000 to a relief fund for the city, but asked that it be held until their franchise was approved.

Graft extended to the ordinary police officer on the beat. On April 24, 1907, the San Francisco Chronicle published a tally of fees illegal operations were expected to pay. Brothels paid officers on the street $5 per week, sergeants $15, captains $25, and the Police Chief $75 to $100 each week. This schedule also extended to gambling houses and saloons that offered prostitutes.

William J. Burns, a former Secret Service Agent who had assisted Heney during the prosecution of the Oregon land graft scandal, was hired to assist Heney. He quietly began gathering evidence in June, 1906.

=== Heney initiates prosecution ===
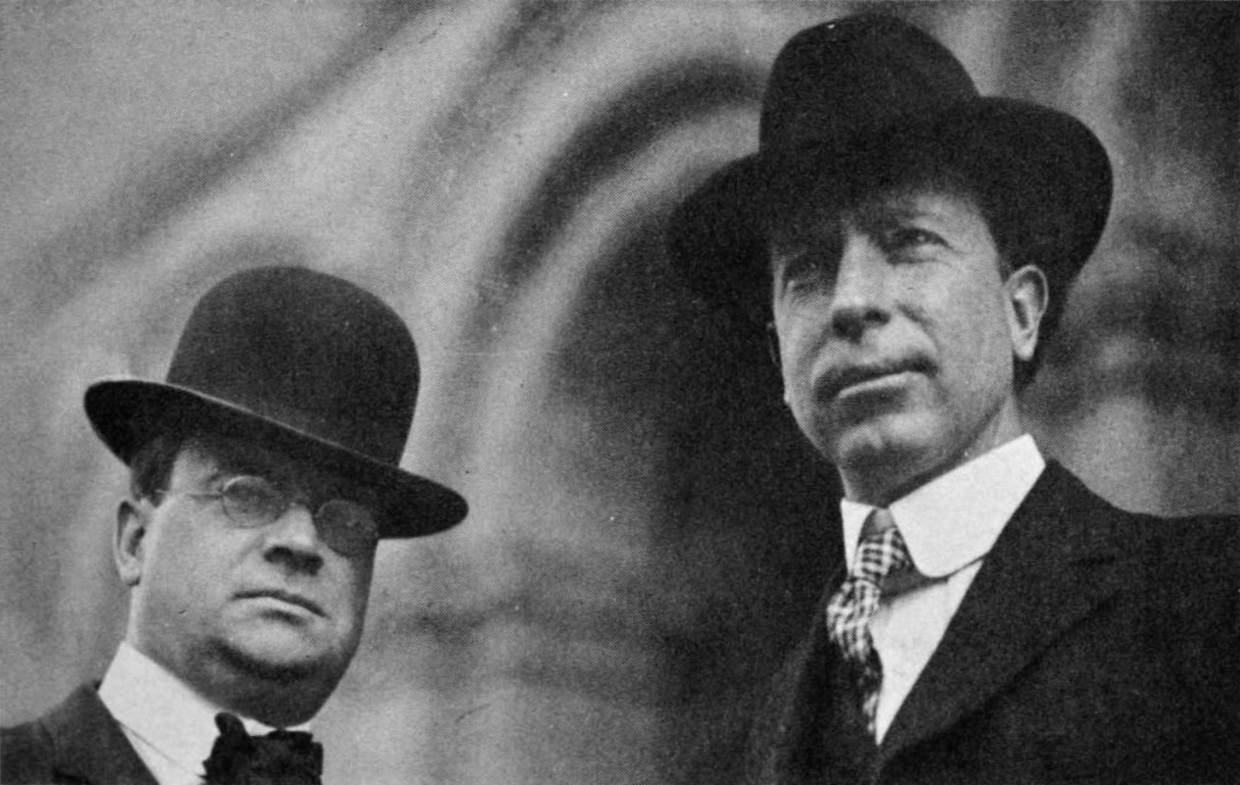
Hiram W. Johnson (left), specially retained by the State, and District Attorney William H. Langdon arrive for trial preliminaries on behalf of the prosecution.

Spreckels was so eager to remove Schmitz from office, that on May 10, 1906, he told Heney he would obtain the funds necessary to underwrite the costs of prosecuting members of the Schmitz Administration for graft. He and Older encouraged San Francisco District Attorney William H. Langdon to support their efforts to end the corruption. While the union thought that Langdon would support their cause, he held firm to his principles. On October 21, 1906, he published a statement saying he intended to convene a Grand Jury to investigate the rise in crime and the widely reported instances of corruption.

Thomas F. Graham, presiding judge of the San Francisco County Superior Court in 1906

On October 24, 1906, Langdon appointed Heney as an assistant district attorney. The grand jury was scheduled to convene on October 26. Mayor Schmitz was traveling in Europe, so the next day James L. Gallagher, de facto leader of the board of supervisors and acting mayor, acting at the behest of Abe Ruef, suspended Langdon for alleged "neglect of office". His motion at the board of supervisors meeting was read and adopted without debate or opposition. As requested by Ruef, the primary targets of the investigation, Gallagher appointed him as acting district attorney. Ruef then attempted to fire Heney, writing him a curt note, "You are hereby removed from the position of Assistant District Attorney of the City and County of San Francisco." Heney rebuffed Ruef's action, saying he did not recognize Ruef as district attorney.

Heney filed a temporary restraining motion before Superior Court Judge Seawell to bar Ruef from acting as district attorney, who granted it at 5:00 a.m. the next morning. The judge ordered a police officer and two deputy sheriffs installed in the District Attorney's office to prevent Ruef from occupying it. All three city newspapers soundly condemned Ruef's transparent attempt to scuttle the investigation and prosecution. The Examiner called their actions "the last stand of criminals hunted and driven to bay." The Bulletin headline read, "Ruef's Illegal Action is Confession of Guilt." In early November, Judge Seawell ruled that the injunction prohibiting Ruef from replacing Langdon as district attorney would stand.

On October 28, Tirey Ford, the general counsel for United Railroads, told the San Francisco Examiner, "Of course there was no bribery nor offer to bribe, nor was there anything done except upon clean and legitimate lines." Ironically, Ford had been appointed to the State Board of Prison Directors in 1905, a position he maintained throughout the time charges were pending against him.

== Grand jury convenes ==
The grand jury in Collier's, January 12, 1907

The grand jury was impaneled at the temporary court set up in Temple Israel, at 2:00 p.m. on October 26, 1906, as Langdon had promised, and with Langdon still officially in office. Hundreds of people tried to attend the proceedings, and the police packed the courtroom with Ruef supporters, allowing only a few supporters of the prosecution. Outside, the largest percentage of those present cheered the arrival of Langdon, Heney, and Spreckels. Ruef appeared guarded by two police officers.

Principals in the Ruef trial, seated in court, 1907. Facing the camera, left to right: Rudolph Spreckels (financial backer of the graft prosecution), Francis J. Heney (Assistant District Attorney), William H. Langdon (District Attorney), Samuel Shortridge (attorney to Ruef) and Abe Ruef (defendant).

The grand jury heard testimony about "French Restaurants" in the Tenderloin district of San Francisco that supplied both food and "private supper bedrooms" for their patrons and prostitutes. When the police commission acted in January 1905 to close down all such establishments, they were advised to call on Ruef. Ruef was a nightly patron of one of the establishments, known as the "Pup," owned by Jean Loupy. The several restaurants paid Ruef a "retainer" of $8,000 (about $287,000 in 2025), half of which he gave to Mayor Schmitz, who had advised the police commissioner to close them down in the first place. Ruef appeared before the Police Commission and proposed a method for regulating the French Restaurants, none of which affected the way they had already been operating, and his regulations were approved.

After only two weeks of testimony, the grand jury returned indictments on November 15 against Schmitz and Ruef on five counts each of extortion. Ruef initially refused to stand when the indictments were read, and when required to stand, insolently stood with his back to the judge. Ruef publicly denounced the indictments, insisting that he had merely accepted fees in return for services. "I was simply acting in the relation of attorney to a client." Schmitz, who had been vacationing in Europe, turned around and headed home for San Francisco. Both men were arraigned on December 6, and it became apparent that their strategy would start with a fight to evade or postpone trial by attacking the validity of the grand jury.

=== Court convenes ===
Judge Frank H. Dunne, who presided over the Schmitz trial.

For three days the defense attorneys challenged members of the grand jury, but Judge Dunne finally swept aside all of their technical objections. The defense then tried to convince the judge that Spreckels had personal motives in paying the costs of Heney's prosecution, and then they attacked Langdon's motives for hiring Heney. This lasted until January 22, when Dunne once again set aside all of the defense's motions. The defense then tried to get the case moved from Dunne's court, without success. Congressman Julius Kahn, a supporter of Schmitz, then requested that Schmitz come to Washington, D.C. immediately to discuss the issue of whether Japanese should be allowed to attend San Francisco Schools. Schmitz didn't return until March 6, delaying the trial further.

While Schmitz was away, Ruef was finally forced to enter a plea of not guilty, and his trial was set for March 5. But the day before the trial was to begin, Ruef's attorney's succeeded in raising an issue in Judge Hebbard's court that required intervention of the federal courts. That appearance was set for May 2 in Washington before the Supreme Court. Then Ruef disappeared and failed to show up in Dunne's court the next Monday. Dunne ruled that the trial in his court would proceed, regardless of what was transpiring in Judge Hebbard's court, which he felt was a fraud. He ordered Ruef's bonds forfeited and Ruef's arrest. Ruef's attorneys then tried to appeal to the State Appellate Court, who denied the writ, unsigned by the absent defendant. County Sheriff O'Neil was unable to find Ruef, and Judge Denne replaced him with the County Coroner, W.J. Walsh, as elisor, and charged him to bring Ruef into court. The coroner also failed to find Ruef, and Dunne then appointed Sheriff William J. Biggy as elisor and instructed him to arrest the fugitive. Biggy located Ruef within two hours at a roadhouse on the outskirts of San Francisco and arrested him. But Biggy didn't know where to place Ruef, for both the police and sheriff's office had were under suspicion of graft, so he placed Ruef under arrest in a room in the temporary "little" Saint Francis Hotel built in the ruins of Union Square and later in a house at 2849 Fillmore Street, This arrangement lasted more than a year.

=== Supervisors implicated ===
"Ex-Mayor Schmitz and his Board of Supervisors." (Thomas Lonergan is second from left, James L. Gallagher is sixth from left, and Schmitz is seventh from left)

As the investigation proceeded, other indictments were forthcoming. Supervisor Fred Nicholas was charged with accepting a bribe for $26,100 for furniture purchased for the city. Witnesses were indicted for perjury. Then, on March 7, 1907, while Ruef was still in hiding, Detective Burns set up a sting and witnessed Supervisor Thomas Lonergan accept a bribe from Golden M. Roy, owner of a well-known cafe with interests in several other businesses, including a skating rink. The city was considering an ordinance regulating skating rinks and Roy purportedly wanted Lonergan's help defeating the measure. Burns repeated the deception with two more supervisors, Edward Walsh and Dr. Charles Boxton. Gallagher suspected a trap and contacted Ruef, and they both encouraged Lonergan to return the bribe, but instead Lonergan accepted another $500. Burns and two other witnesses were concealed in an adjacent room on each occasion.

Burns summoned Heney and Langdon, who after five hours coerced Lonergan and Walsh to confess about the graft operations at City Hall, exposing payoffs from Home Telephone (10 supervisors $3,500 each and seven supervisors $6,000 each (or about $130,000 and $210,000 in 2025); Bay Cities Water; Pacific Gas & Electric ($750 each); Pacific States Telephone Co. (10 supervisors $5,000 ($70,000 in 2025))); United Railroads ($40,000 to each supervisor and $400,000 to Ruef); the Parkside Realty companies; and boxing interests ($750 to each supervisor, Ruef and Schmitz $10,000 each). But neither of the two men implicated Gallagher or Ruef, and the prosecution badly wanted information that would allow them to bring more charges against the two masterminds and the corporate executives who had supplied the money. Gallagher was induced to meet with Spreckels during which a deal was worked our for Gallegher's testimony implicating Ruef and Schmitz, in exchange for immunity for himself and all of the Supervisors. Gallagher then met with all of the supervisors in a final secret caucus and offered them the immunity deal, which 16 of them accepted.

On March 14, Tirey L. Ford told The San Francisco Call that the grand jury's graft investigation wasn't legal and he refused to testify.

On March 19, Lonergan testified in front of the grand jury to having received $169,350 from Ruef that was transferred to the Supervisors. He and the now-immunized Supervisors detailed the source of the more than $200,000 received by the board members, naming the more than 20 board members of the several corporations who had contributed bribery funds, who were then in turn compelled to testify. Calhoun of United Railroads was one of the few holdouts: he refused to testify and exercised his right against self-incrimination.

On March, 20, Ruef was charged with 65 more counts of graft. The grand jury also charged Theodore V. Halsey, the former confidential political for Pacific States Telephone and Telegraph Company, with 14 counts of graft for the bribes paid to Supervisors to deny a competitive bid for telephone service in San Francisco. The judge set bail at $10,000 per count, or $650,000 for Ruef and $100,000 for Halsey.

On March 23, the grand jury revealed an indictment against A.K. Detwiller, a capitalist from Toledo, Ohio and investor in the Home Telephone Company, and nine counts against Louis Glass, formerly a vice-president of Pacific States Telephone and Telegraph Co., for bribing supervisors. The grand jury learned that 9 of the 16 supervisors paid by PT&T through Ruef and Gallagher to oppose the Home Telephone Company's bid for a franchise had also accepted payments from the Home Telephone Company to support its bid.

=== Ruef confesses ===
Ruef is transported to and from court. The ruins of the old San Francisco City Hall can be seen in the background of the lower picture.

Heney and Spreckels meanwhile met with officers of the major companies implicated in the bribery scheme and encouraged them to come forward and implicate Ruef and Schmitz. But the executives pretended that any rumors about bribery were baseless and denied any knowledge of the payoffs. The prosecution's only hope to convict the executives of bribery was to prove a conspiracy, that they gave money to Ruef, a non-public official, with the intent that he pass it on to the Supervisors, who were. The Supervisors' testimony, while important, was only circumstantial. They needed Ruef's testimony to implicate the other men.

Heney tried to persuade Ruef to offer evidence implicating Calhoun, Ford, and of United Railroads, but Ruef demanded complete immunity for himself and Schmitz in exchange for a confession, which Heney refused. California Governor James Gillett considered removing Schmitz from office but found that the City Charter didn't contain a provision allowing removal of a sitting mayor.

During jury selection for the second trial, Heney found that one of the individuals impaneled, Morris Haas, had been convicted for embezzlement, although he was later pardoned. Detectives learned that Haas had boasted to his mistress that he would sell his vote for Ruef's acquittal. Believing Ruef was trying to plant the man on the jury, Heney publicly exposed Haas's forgery conviction while Haas was seated in the jury box and declared he was ineligible to serve.

The jury could not reach a verdict and A.E.S. Blake was later convicted and sentenced for offering a bribe to juror J.M. Kelly.

The prosecution reached an agreement with Ruef requiring Ruef to confess and in return he would receive immunity from most of the charges against him. On May 15, 1907, Ruef changed his plea to guilty and the next day in testimony before the grand jury he incriminated Schmitz.

On top of Ruef's confession, his trial continued for another 18 months, until December 10, 1908, on the remaining counts that he had not confessed to. The jury found him guilty and sentenced him to the maximum sentence for bribery, 14 years in San Quentin State Prison." He spent the next year at the county jail awaiting his appeal. In December 1909, he was released on bond of $600,000.

=== Ford indicted ===
Tirey L. Ford in court with his attorneys, Earl Rogers and A. A. Moore, 1907. Ford was serving as California State Attorney General when he began making secret payments to Abe Ruef on behalf of United Railroads.

The case against Tirey Ford went ahead and he was indicted in May 1907, charged with bribing Supervisor Thomas F. Lonergan. The San Francisco Bulletin described Ford as "a man whose error was caused by a mistaken loyalty to a corrupt corporation and in whose fall many will sorrow and none will rejoice." Ruef admitted that he had received a $200,000 "attorney's fee" from Ford that he had used to make payments to the Supervisors. But Ruef would not admit that his dealings with Ford were anything other legal fees to Ruef to compensate him for his legal services to United Railroad. He said the same was true of his dealings with Calhoun, that they entirely professional. All three men were experienced lawyers, and if they engaged in a conspiracy, it may have been entirely implicit. Despite encouragement from Burns and Heney, Ruef would not testify that the men intended to bribe the Supervisors.

Patrick Calhoun (right) and his attorney, Earl Rogers.

Calhoun spared no expense in defending himself and Ford. He hired an array of detectives to help with the investigation and a battery of attorneys to defend him. The attorneys included Earl Rogers of Los Angeles, and Alexander King, Calhoun's partner in New York, who gained admittance to California Bar just for Ford's case. In presenting Calhoun and Tirey's defense, Rogers argued that the prosecution had failed to make a case against the defendants, and didn't call a single witness or introduce any evidence.

Ford's first trial began on September 23, 1907. The prosecution secured testimony from Frank Leach, Superintendent of the Mint, who produced records that showed on May 22, 1906, Calhoun sent $200,000 from the east by telegraph that was deposited to the Mint. The records also showed that Ford drew $50,000 in small bills against the deposit on May 25, $50,000 on July 31, and the remainder on August 31. The dates corresponded approximately to two dates in early August and at the end of August that the Supervisors testified to having received payments from Gallagher.

The sensational case was submitted to the jury. When the jury failed to reach a verdict, a mistrial was declared, and a second jury was convened. Ford was charged with bribing Supervisor Jennings Phillips and a second trial began on November 26, 1907, which also failed to reach a verdict, and a third trial began on April 4, 1908. Ford was charged with bribing Supervisor Daniel G. Coleman to help United Railroads secure a franchise to erect an overhead trolley system. On May 3, 1908, the jury found Ford not guilty.

=== Schmitz indicted ===
James V. Coffey, presiding judge of the San Francisco County Superior Court in 1907

On May 20, 1907, Mayor Schmitz was charged on the same indictment as Ruef for extorting money from the Tenderloin district French Restaurants.

Schmitz was convicted and forced out of office on June 13, 1907. But Schmitz's conviction was voided when a higher court ruled that there was a flaw in the indictment that failed to use Schmitz official title as mayor of San Francisco.

On January 10, 1908, the California Appellate Court reversed Schmitz's conviction and nullified the indictments still pending against Ruef.

=== Ruef trial begins ===
On April 3, 1908, the prosecution began interviewing prospective jurors and had nearly completed their selection of 12 men when Ruef began begging Heney through others to consider a deal that would allow Ruef full immunity in exchange for his testimony. Heney refused to consider full immunity, insisting that Ruef take his chances on the indictment for graft. Ruef finally accepted these terms and on May 17, 1908, told the court he was ready to change his plea to guilty and make a full confession. The prosecution had scant evidence against Schmitz and without Ruef's testimony had little chance of obtaining a conviction against him.

It took more than 70 days to examining prospective jurors and find 12 qualified jurors. On November 7, 1908, a jury was impaneled and sworn in for Ruef's third trial.

=== Calhoun indicted ===
In May and June, 1909, the Calhoun trial held testimony connecting him with bribing Supervisor Lonergan. On June 21, 1909, the Calhoun jury was deadlocked, with the final jury vote at ten for acquittal and two for conviction.

The charges against Calhoun were dismissed when his political supporters won office in the November, 1909 elections. In early 1910, Charles Fickert, the new district attorney, requested to dismiss the indictment against Calhoun. In 1911, Fickert appealed to a higher state court, which brought dismissal of all indictments against Calhoun.

== Bomb destroys Gallagher's home ==
James L. Gallagher's home following the explosion.

On April 29, 1908, a powerful explosion wrecked a portion of the Gallaghers' home in Alameda, including the room upstairs in which Gallagher and his wife were located, but both escaped unhurt. Their two daughters, a son, along with guests Mr. and Mrs. Schenck, and a gentlemen calling on the ladies, were also in the home. Because their dinner was late, they were kept in a portion of the house that was not seriously damaged, and they also escaped injury.

Some of the newspaper editors supporting Gallagher's prosecution insinuated that Gallagher had arranged to blow up his own house to gain public sympathy. However, John and Peter Claudianes were arrested and confessed to placing the dynamite bomb under Gallagher's home. Peter said he had been paid to kill Gallagher by Felix Paudivaris, a United Railroads employee and a political friend of Ruef's. Paudivaris disappeared shortly after the explosion, but Claudianes and his brother were convicted and sentenced to life in prison.

=== Heney shot in court ===
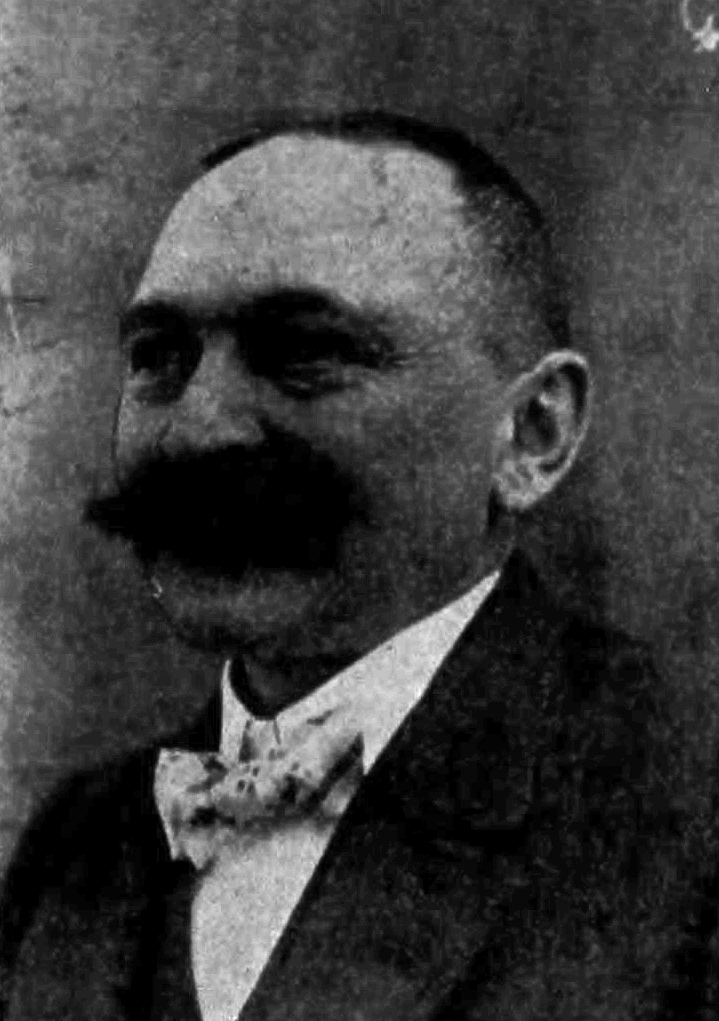
Morris Haas, the juror who shot Heney.

Morris Haas, the ex-convict whom Heney had exposed during jury selection, deeply resented Heney's action and brooded over it for many weeks. Haas attended the trial and during its eleventh week, when a temporary recess was called in the late afternoon of November 13, 1908, as Heney conferred with another attorney, Haas walked up and shot Heney at point-blank range in the head. The wound, a half-inch in front of his right ear and just below the temple, was initially pronounced fatal. Heney was hospitalized, and on the operating table said, "I will live to prosecute Haas and Ruef."

That night Haas was placed in a prison cell with a policeman to guard him, but despite these precautions was found dead with a bullet hole in the middle of his forehead the following morning, a derringer beside him. The 1910 Oliver Grand Jury reported that two detectives had searched Haas after he shot Heney. It couldn't be determined whether Haas committed suicide, and if so, how he'd obtained the pistol, or whether he was murdered to prevent his testimony. Some believed that the same individuals who paid Claudianes to bomb the Gallagher residence were responsible for Haas's death. Others thought that Ruef, who they believed had hired Haas to murder Heney, had made sure Haas was silenced.

Heney did not die from his gunshot wound, as he had been expected to, and the trial resumed on November 18 after Judge William P. Lawlor dismissed several defense motions. The prosecutor's role was assumed by Hiram Johnson, a Sacramento private practice trial attorney, who had been specially retained to assist the San Francisco District Attorney's Office in the trial. During the trial, Johnson proved himself a hard-nosed, anti-corruption advocate, who went on to be elected to two terms as California's Republican 23rd governor (1911-1917) and five-terms as a Republican U.S. Senator from California (1917-1945), until dying in office on the day the U.S. dropped an atomic bomb on Japan.

Detective Burns had given Johnson the names of four jurors who, Burns said, had been bribed, and in his summation Johnson called each of them by name, pointed a forefinger at him, and shouted: "You – you dare not acquit this man!" Nevertheless, when the jury retired for its deliberations everyone expected that it would let Ruef go, or would disagree, as had happened in almost every other case growing out of the graft prosecution.

== Ruef convicted ==
While the jury was out Heney telephoned Older to say that he was much recovered, and proposed to come down and pay his respects to the judge. Older, with his usual flair for the dramatic, told Heney not to come until the editor gave the signal. While most of the community was by now against the prosecution, there was a minority on the side of honesty, which had organized a League of Justice pledged to help at a moment's notice. Older now hastily sent word to dozens of these men, who came and crowded into the courtroom, which was directly under the chamber in which the jury was deliberating.

Evelyn Wells, in her biography of Older, tells what happened when Heney entered the courtroom on Older's arm:

The 'minutemen' raised a shout of welcome. Older himself trumpeted like a bull elephant. The rest of the crowd joined in ... It was a cheer of welcome, but to the scared jury on the floor above it sounded like a bellowed demand for lynching. A few minutes later twelve men good and true filed hurriedly into the courtroom. They had hastily made up their minds. All were deathly white. Some trembled. A few were weeping.

The jury's found Ruef guilty and he was sentenced to 14 years in prison. In November 1910, his conviction and sentence were finally upheld, and on March 1, 1911, he entered prison.

=== Schmitz convicted, released ===
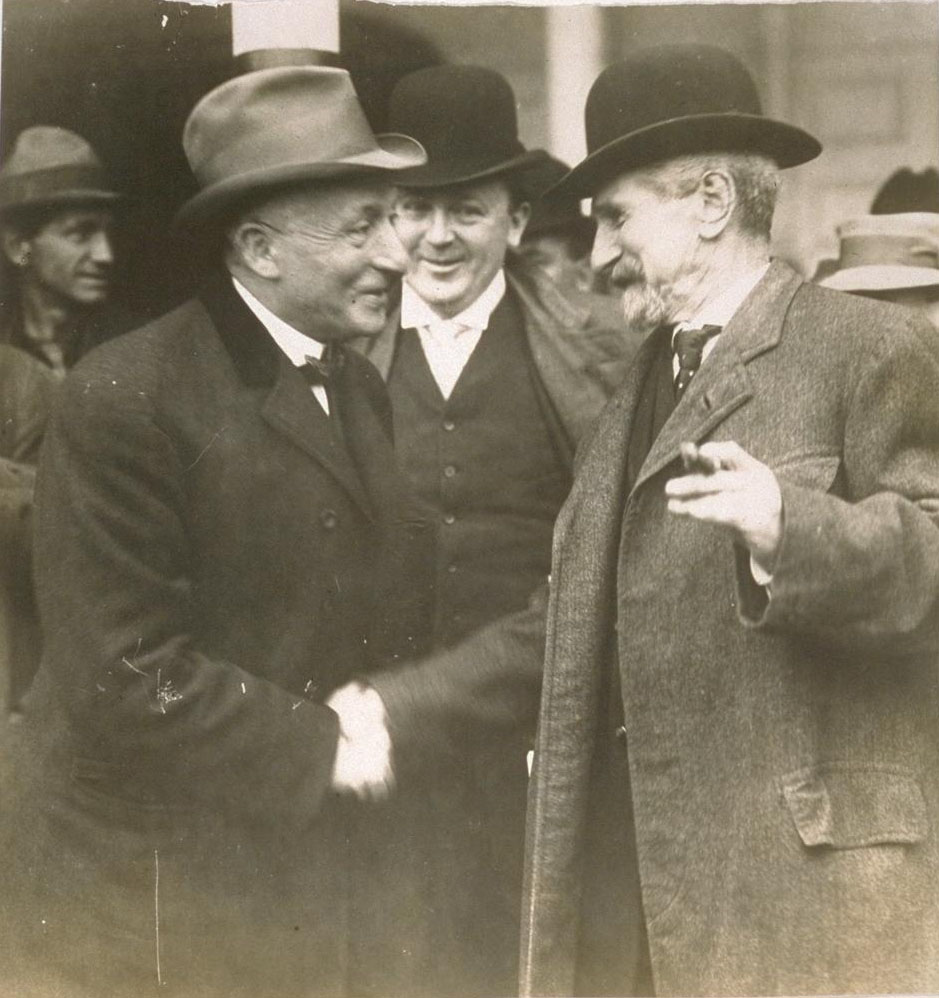
Boss Ruef on his way to San Quentin State Prison after he was convicted in the graft trial of 1907–1908.

On June 13, 1907, Mayor E.E. Schmitz was found guilty of extortion and the office of mayor was declared vacant. He was sent to jail to await sentence. Shortly thereafter he was sentenced to five years at San Quentin State Prison, the maximum sentence the law allowed. He immediately appealed. While awaiting the outcome of the appeal, Schmitz was kept in a cell in San Francisco County Jail. Dr. Edward R. Taylor, Dean of Hastings College of the Law, agreed to step in as interim mayor and was given power to appoint new supervisors to replace those who had resigned.

On January 9, 1908, the District Court of Appeals nullified his conviction. Two months later, the California Supreme Court upheld the Court of Appeal's ruling, and Schmitz was released on bail, pending resolution of the outstanding bribery indictments.

He was brought to trial once more in 1912, on charges of bribery. Ruef was brought from San Quentin to testify, but refused to give evidence. The other key witness, Supervisor Gallagher, had disappeared without leave to Vancouver, British Columbia, Canada, and did not return. Schmitz was acquitted.

Schmitz ran for mayor again in 1915 and 1919, but was soundly defeated due to his past reputation. Elected to the Board of Supervisors in 1921, he remained until 1925. He was married and had two daughters.

=== Police Chief dies ===
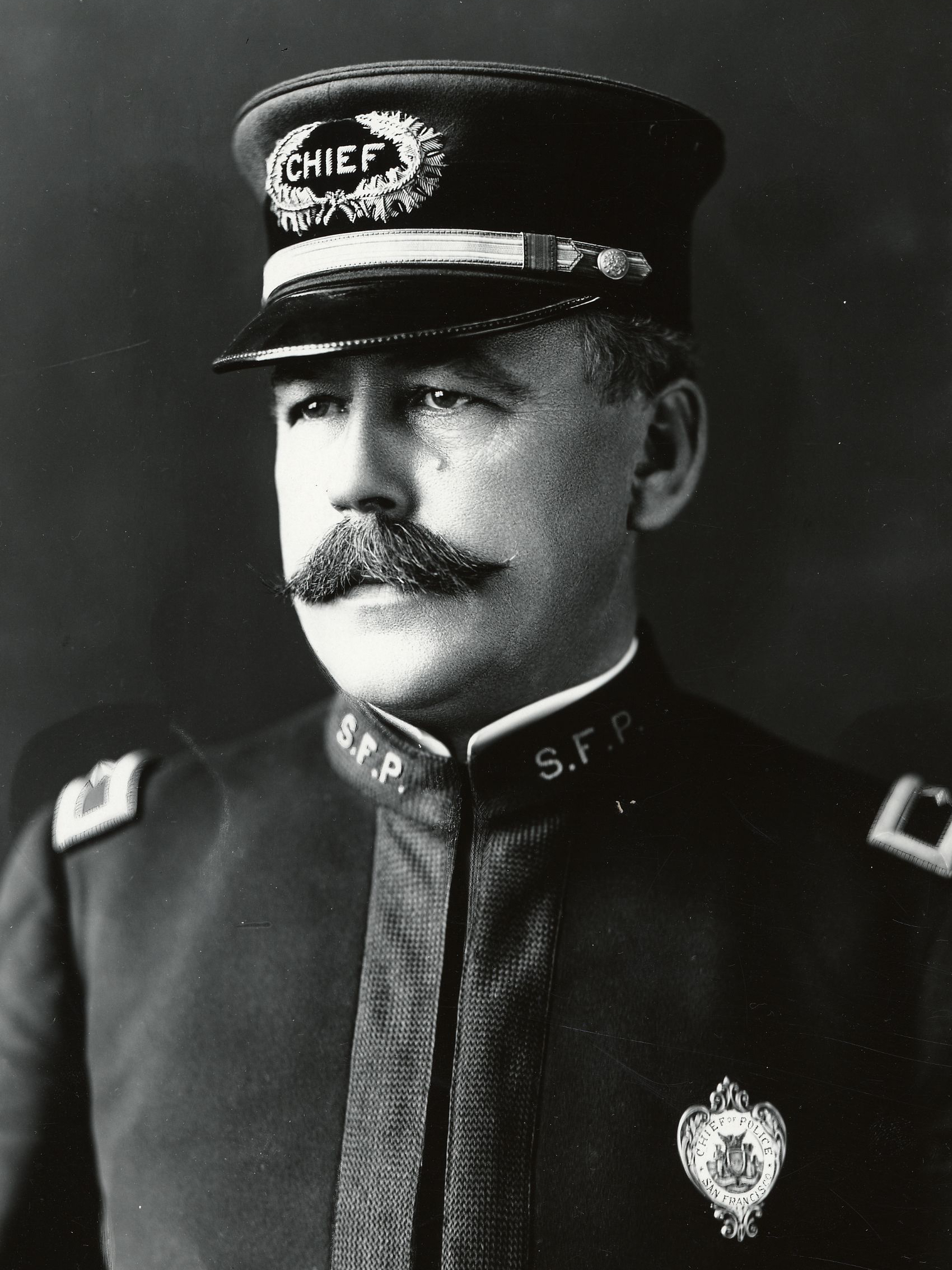
Police Chief William J. Biggy, who may have committed suicide.

Heney and others publicly criticized Chief of Police William J. Biggy for the negligence and lax security that allowed Haas to kill himself with a hidden derringer, and Biggy was deeply hurt by Heney's allegations. Biggy had a falling out with those supporting the graft prosecution and was placed under surveillance by detectives employed by Burns.

Biggy discussed his resignation with police commissioner Hugo Keil on December 1, 1908. While returning from that meeting during a nighttime crossing of San Francisco Bay from Belvedere to San Francisco aboard a police launch, Biggy went missing, a possible suicide. His body was found two weeks later floating in the bay. Biggy was a devout Catholic and the public thought it unlikely that he would commit suicide, but the Coroner's Jury returned a verdict of accidental death.

== Aftermath ==
Of all the sentences meted out to leading figures in the whole course of the prosecution, Ruef was the only individual who served prison time. When another municipal election approached in 1909, District Attorney Langdon refused to run again. Langdon was tired and discouraged at the lack of success in prosecuting the officials who had paid the bribes. Supervisor James Gallagher, a key witness, had fled the country for Vancouver, British Columbia.

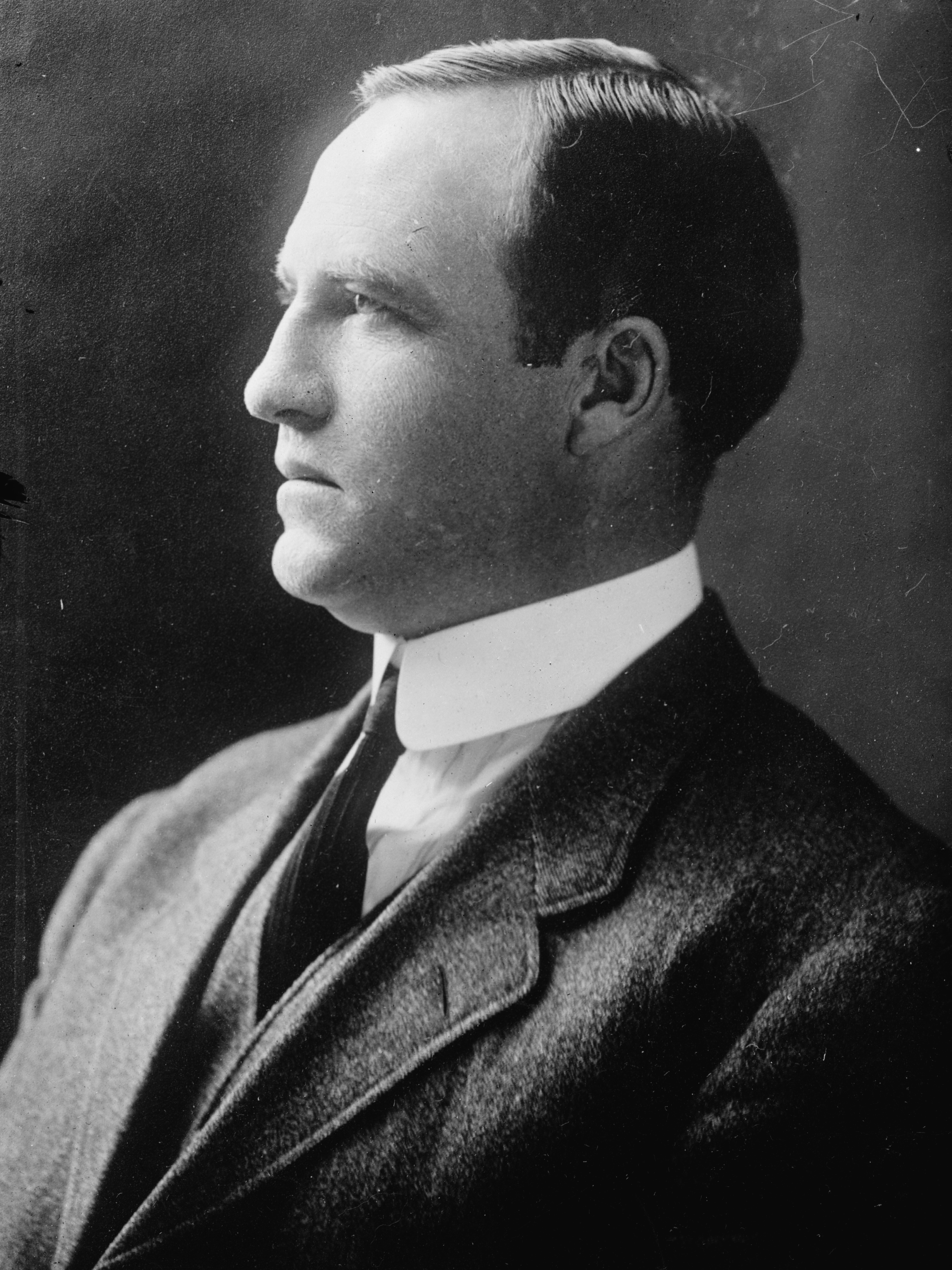
Attorney Charles Fickert, who beat Heney for the District Attorney's office in 1909 with the support of the Union Labor Party.

In desperation, Heney ran for district attorney, but was defeated by a Union Labor loyalist, lawyer, and former football hero from Stanford University, Charles Fickert, whose liaison with the crooked politicians was well known.

Fickert promptly and contemptuously refused to proceed with any of the pending cases against the businessmen who had paid the bribes. He pretended he didn't know where Supervisor Gallagher had fled, although his location in Vancouver was common knowledge. (Fickert later gained a notorious reputation when he mishandled the 1916 Preparedness Day Bombing case and was defeated for District Attorney in 1919.)

Judge William P. Lawlor, who presided over the Ruef and Calhoun trials.

William P. Lawlor, the honest judge who had presided in several of the cases, excoriated Fickert and ordered the others to trial, but he was overruled by the court of appeals, which decided that all of the large number of remaining indictments should be quashed. The graft prosecution was over, having ended in almost total failure, with only Ruef in prison."

On August 17, 1911, Judge Lawlor dismissed all remaining indictments in the trolley bribery cases against Ford, Calhoun and other officials of the United Railroads.

On November 1, 1912, Louis Glass, formerly the Vice President at Pacific Telephone and Telegraph Company, was in court for a hearing. He had been accused of offering a bribe to a Supervisor to support the company's bid for the telephone franchise. Glass was the last to be prosecuted for graft, and he insisted that his rights to a speedy trial had been violated. Judge Lawlor reluctantly agreed and dismissed the charges pending against Glass.

=== Ruef serves four years ===
In 1912, Older began to have second thoughts about Ruef's conviction. He asked Ruef to write his memoirs, which were published in the San Francisco Bulletin in installments almost daily over months, finishing at the point where the graft investigation began. On August 23, 1915, having served a little more than four and a half of his fourteen-year sentence, he was released. He was the only person in the entire investigation who went to prison. He was not allowed to return to his legal practice. "Before he went to prison he had been worth over a million dollars, when he died he was bankrupt."
