= Committee of Fifty (1906) =

Created by Mayor Eugene Schmitz during the 1906 San Francisco earthquake

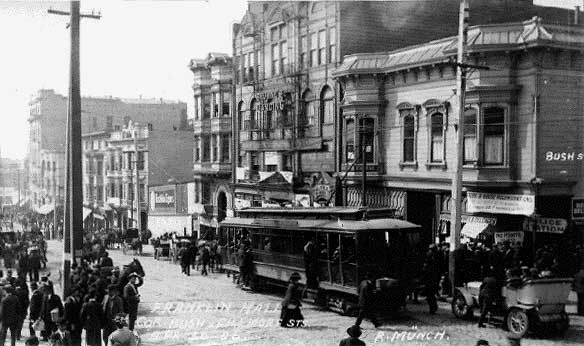
Franklin Hall, the committee's final venue

This Committee of Fifty, sometimes referred to as Committee of Safety, Citizens' Committee of Fifty or Relief and Restoration Committee of Law and Order, was called into existence by Mayor Eugene Schmitz during the 1906 San Francisco earthquake. The Mayor invited civic leaders, entrepreneurs, newspaper men and politicians—but none of the members of the San Francisco Board of Supervisors—to participate in this committee in whose hands the civil administration of San Francisco would rest.

Schmitz thought it necessary to form this body to manage the crisis during the disaster, although there was no legal basis for it. It first assembled in the basement of the ruined Hall of Justice on the afternoon of the earthquake, Wednesday, April 18, at 3 p.m. By 5 p.m. the location became dangerous and the Committee crossed Portsmouth Square to meet at the Plaza Hotel, which in turn had to be abandoned two hours later. At 8 p.m. the Committee assembled at the Fairmont Hotel's ballroom, sitting along the edge of the stage and on packing cases. At this point, the 19 sub-committees were set up. Shortly after 11 p.m. they dispersed.

Overnight the Fairmont Hotel burned down. On Thursday, April 19, at 6 a.m., the Committee met at the North End police station. At 11 a.m. they had to abandon the police station because of the scorching heat, and reconvened at 2 p.m. at Franklin Hall, on Fillmore Street, where they stayed for the remainder of the crisis, which became known as Temporary City Hall. At 4.30 p.m. Abe Ruef appeared there. He had not been called to be a member, but invited himself, and Mayor Schmitz accepted his offer, and he became chairman of an additional sub-committee, trying unsuccessfully to relocate the Chinese. Actually, there were more than a hundred members, but they never met all together, since during the chaos members came and went as they could or would.

== Members ==
On April 19, 1906, The New York Times published the first list of the members of the committee with 49 names - it did not include that of the Mayor - which originated the name Committee of Fifty. Later, more and more people went to the meetings and here are the names of people who were mentioned by different sources as members:

- Eugene Schmitz, Mayor, Chairman of the Committee of Fifty
- Rufus P. Jennings, Secretary of the Committee of Fifty, executive officer of the California Promotion Committee
- Frank P. Anderson
- Hugo K. Asher, afterwards Delegate to the 1920 Democratic National Convention from California
- William Babcock, Vice-President of the Pacific-Union Club 1897,
- William J. Bartnett, chief counsel of the Western Pacific Railroad
- Clement Pelham Bennett, court reporter
- Maurice Block
- Henry Ulysses Brandenstein, lawyer
- J. Dalzell Brown
- S. G. Buckbee
- H. M. Burke
- Michael Casey
- Albert E. Castle
- Myrtle E. Cerf, California's first woman CPA
- I. Choynski, Press Agent of the Committee
- Oscar Cooper
- R. H. Countryman
- Paul Cowles
- Harry T. Creswell, some time City and County Attorney and Police Commissioner, afterwards Delegate to the 1912 Democratic National Convention from California
- Henry J. Crocker, businessman
- R. A. Crothers, publisher of the San Francisco Evening Bulletin
- O. K. Cushing, lawyer
- Horace Davis, ex-United States Representative
- George Dillman
- Jeremiah Dinan, Chief of Police
- Edgar J. De Pue, President of The Pacific-Union Club 1906-1908
- Michael H. de Young, owner of the San Francisco Chronicle
- A. B. C. Dohrman
- Frank G. Drum, Treasurer of The Pacific-Union Club 1911-1914
- John Sylvester Drum, attorney, afterwards President of The Mercantile Trust Company, Director of the Pacific Gas & Electric Company, and president of the American Bankers Association
- George F. Duffy
- F. J. Dwyer
- Garrett W. Enerney
- C. W. Fay, postmaster
- Tirey L. Ford, attorney for United Railroads, ex-California Attorney General
- Charles S. Fee
- Katharine Felton, Director of the Family Service Agency of San Francisco
- John W. Ferris
- Dr. Thomas Filben, Methodist minister
- James L. Flood
- T. C. Friedlander
- Dr. Garceau
- Thomas Garrett
- Mark L. Gerstle
- Louis T. Glass, director of telephone companies, and inventor of the Jukebox
- Wellington Gregg, Jr.
- R. B. Hale, owner of Hale Brothers department store
- Dr. Harris, physician
- Ralph Harrison
- Richard C. Harrison, attorney, partner in the law firm of Harrison & Harrison
- William Greer Harrison, agent for Thames and Mersey Marine Insurance Co, Liverpool
- John Downey Harvey, major shareholder of Ocean Shore Railroad
- Isaias W. Hellman, banker
- Francis J. Heney, special federal prosecutor, later the same year prosecuted Schmitz and Ruef for bribery
- George A. Hensley
- William F. Herrin, Chief Counsel of Southern Pacific Railroad
- Dr. Marcus Herstein, physician
- Howard Carlton Holmes, Chief Engineer of the San Francisco Dry Dock Company
- J. R. Howell, Chairman of the San Francisco Real Estate Board
- A. M. Hunt
- Judge John Hunt, of the San Francisco Superior Court
- D. V. Kelly
- Homer King
- George A. Knight
- F. H. Lamb
- Franklin Knight Lane, lawyer, afterwards US Secretary of the Interior
- Hartland Law, manufacturer of patent medicines
- Herbert E. Law, brother of Hartland Law
- W. H. Leahy
- John J. Lermen, attorney
- Charles Loesch
- H. D. Loveland
- C. G. Lyman
- C. H. Maddox
- Frank Maestretti
- Thomas Magee
- John J. Mahoney
- Rabbi A. W. Mann
- John Martin
- Dr. McGill
- John McLauren
- Gavin McNab
- John McNaught
- S. B. McNear
- John F. Merrill
- William H. Metson
- Archbishop George Thomas Montgomery, coadjutor of San Francisco
- Edward F. Moran, former President of the San Francisco Civil Service Commission
- US Circuit Judge William W. Morrow, president of the San Francisco Red Cross
- Irving F. Moulton
- Thornwell Mullally, assistant to Patrick Calhoun, of United Railroads of San Francisco
- S. G. Murphy
- George A. Newhall, Secretary of The Pacific-Union Club 1896-1897, 1908
- William Ford Nichols, Episcopal Bishop of California
- Hermann Oelrichs, of Norddeutsche Lloyd shipping line, son-in-law of James Graham Fair
- Father Phillip O'Ryan
- Robert Park
- A. H. Payson
- James D. Phelan, ex-Mayor of San Francisco, predecessor of Schmitz
- Albert Pissis, architect
- Willis Polk, architect
- Allan Pollock
- Edward B. Pond, ex-Mayor of San Francisco
- A. S. Porter
- Harry V. Ramsdell
- J. W. Raphael
- James W. Reid, Secretary of The Pacific-Union Club 1899-1900
- J. B. Reinstein
- Dr. George David Rich
- Dent H. Robert
- John Rogers
- Abe Ruef, political boss
- Hermann Schussler, hydraulic engineer
- Henry T. Scott, president of Union Iron Works, and Chairman of the Board of Pacific Telephone & Telegraph Company
- Homer T. Scott
- Frank Shea
- James Shea
- Samuel M. Shortridge, lawyer
- George Smith
- John H. Speck, realtor
- Claus Spreckels, sugar magnate
- Rudolph Spreckels, sugar factory owner, son of Claus Spreckels
- I. Steinhart
- Charles Sutro
- Gustave Sutro
- Andrea Sbarbaro, founder of Italian Swiss Colony
- Frank J. Symes, president of the Merchants' Association
- Clem Tobin
- Joseph S. Tobin
- George Toumey
- Rabbi Jacob Voorsanger, rabbi of Temple Emanu-El in San Francisco since 1889
- John P. Young, editor of the San Francisco Chronicle
- Fred Ward
- James Ward
- William Watson
- Fairfax Henry Wheelan, vice-president of the Southern Pacific Milling Co., graduated from Harvard with the class of 1880, together with Theodore Roosevelt
- Benjamin Ide Wheeler, president of the University of California
- Charles Stetson Wheeler, lawyer
- A. W. Wilson
- George W. Witton
- Andrew J. Wood
- Thomas P. Woodward

== Sub-Committees ==
- Relief of the Hungry, chairman Rabbi Jacob Voorsanger
- Housing the Homeless, chairman W. J. Bartnett; Fairfax W. Wheelan
- Relief of Sick and Wounded, chairwoman Katharine Felton
- Drugs and Medical Supplies, chairman Dr. Harris
- Relief of Chinese, chairman Rev. Filben
- Transportation of Refugees, chairman Thomas Magee
- Citizens' Police
- Auxiliary Fire Department
- Restoration of Water Supply, chairman Frank P. Anderson
- Restoration of Light and Telephones, chairman Rudolph Spreckels
- Restoration of Fire in Dwellings, chairman Jeremiah Dinan
- Restoration of Abattoirs
- Resumption of Transportation, chairman Thornwall Mullally
- Resumption of Civil Government, chairman Garett McEnerney
- Resumption of the Judiciary, chairman Judge Charles W. Slack
- Resumption of Retail Trade
- Organization of Wholesalers
- Finance, chairman James D. Phelan
- Sanitation
- Relocation of the Chinese, chairman Abe Ruef
- History and Statistics, chairman Frank S. Drum

== Sources ==
- Gordon Thomas & Max Morgan Witts: The San Francisco Earthquake (New York: Stein and Day, 1971; London: Souvenir Press, 1971; reprinted Dell Paperback, 1972, SBN 440–07631)
