= Earl Rogers =

American lawyer

- Rogers in 1909
- Born: November 18, 1869; Perry, New York, U.S.
- Died: February 22, 1922 (aged 52); Los Angeles, California, U.S.
- Resting place: Evergreen Cemetery, Los Angeles, California
- Education: Syracuse University (attended)
- Occupation: Lawyer

Earl Rogers (November 18, 1869 – February 22, 1922) was an American trial lawyer and professor. Rogers became the inspiration for Erle Stanley Gardner's fictional character Perry Mason. He was posthumously inducted into the Trial Lawyer Hall of Fame.

== Life ==
Rogers (left) and his client Patrick Calhoun, who he represented during the San Francisco graft trials

Earl Rogers was born in Perry, New York on November 18, 1869, the son of Methodist minister Lowell L. Rogers and Ada (Andrus) Rogers. The Reverend Rogers moved the Rogers family to California in 1874. Rogers attended Ashland Academy in Ashland, Oregon and St. Helena Academy in St. Helena, California. He studied at Syracuse University, but left to return to California after his father went bankrupt.

Rogers had wanted to be a surgeon; by his late teens Rogers was married and working as a Los Angeles newspaper reporter. This brought him into contact with the courts, and he began reading law under former U.S. senator Stephen M. White and Judge William P. Gardiner. Rogers was admitted to the bar in 1897, and began to practice in Los Angeles. Rogers did not like criminal law because it was less prestigious than civil practice; but after two years as an attorney, he won a verdict by proving self-defense in the case of William Alford, a plumber who killed Jay E. Hunter, one of the town's leading attorneys. Among the students who later studied law under Rogers was Buron Fitts, who became a Los Angeles County district attorney.

As a defense counsel, Rogers handled 77 murder trials and lost three, out of 183 acquittals over his career with fewer than 20 convictions, even though most of his clients were actually guilty. His expertise was so complete that he became a professor of medical jurisprudence and insanity in the College of Physicians and Surgeons as well as a professor at the University of Southern California Law School.

He was respected for his legal skill, with a good memory for detail, but did research in secret, letting colleagues believe he had known his legal references all along. However his most important skill was his acting, which was rehearsed to appear spontaneous before the jury. One tactic after particularly damaging testimony by a prosecution witness, was to rise and create a scene, inevitably being warned of contempt by the court, but making the jury forget the point of evidence that had been made minutes earlier.

At the time he was retained by Clarence Darrow at the peak of his career, he was earning $100,000 per year. He drank heavily, sobering up in Turkish baths in order to get back to the courtroom for his next case. Another well-known defense attorney, New Yorker William Fallon (who defended gangster Arnold Rothstein during the Black Sox Scandal after the 1919 World Series), was quoted as saying "Even when he's drunk, Earl Rogers is better than any other stone-sober lawyer in the whole damned country".

A few years after the Darrow case, he lost a client to execution, and by 1919 his drinking resulted in few clients. He did win his last trial, keeping himself from being committed to an insane asylum.

He died at age 52 in a Los Angeles rooming house on February 22, 1922; The New York Times obituary was 35 words.

== Legacy ==
His daughter Adela Rogers St. Johns was his assistant during his early career, and she later became a correspondent for William Randolph Hearst (a friend of her father), and a writer for Photoplay. In 1927 she published A Free Soul, a novel where the lawyer-hero wins his most famous case and dies collapsing on the courtroom floor in triumph. The book had appeared in serial form from September 1926 to February 1927 in Hearst's International with Cosmopolitan magazine, and also resulted in a 1928 play and A Free Soul, a 1931 film of the same name, starring Lionel Barrymore with Clark Gable as a gangster. It was voted "One of the Ten Best Pictures of 1931" in a poll by Film Daily.

The California attorney and author Erle Stanley Gardner published his first Perry Mason pulp-fiction story in 1933, inspired by the success and techniques of Rogers, but filled with details and locations from Gardner's life. The character appeared in more than 80 novels by Gardner, as well as Warner Brothers feature films in the 1930's, a CBS Radio program from 1943 to 1955, and a CBS Television program beginning in 1957.

His daughter Adela published a biography of her father in 1962 titled Final Verdict. It was adapted for a TNT television film of the same name in 1991.
