= Richard Dyer-Bennet =

English-born American folk singer (1913–1991)

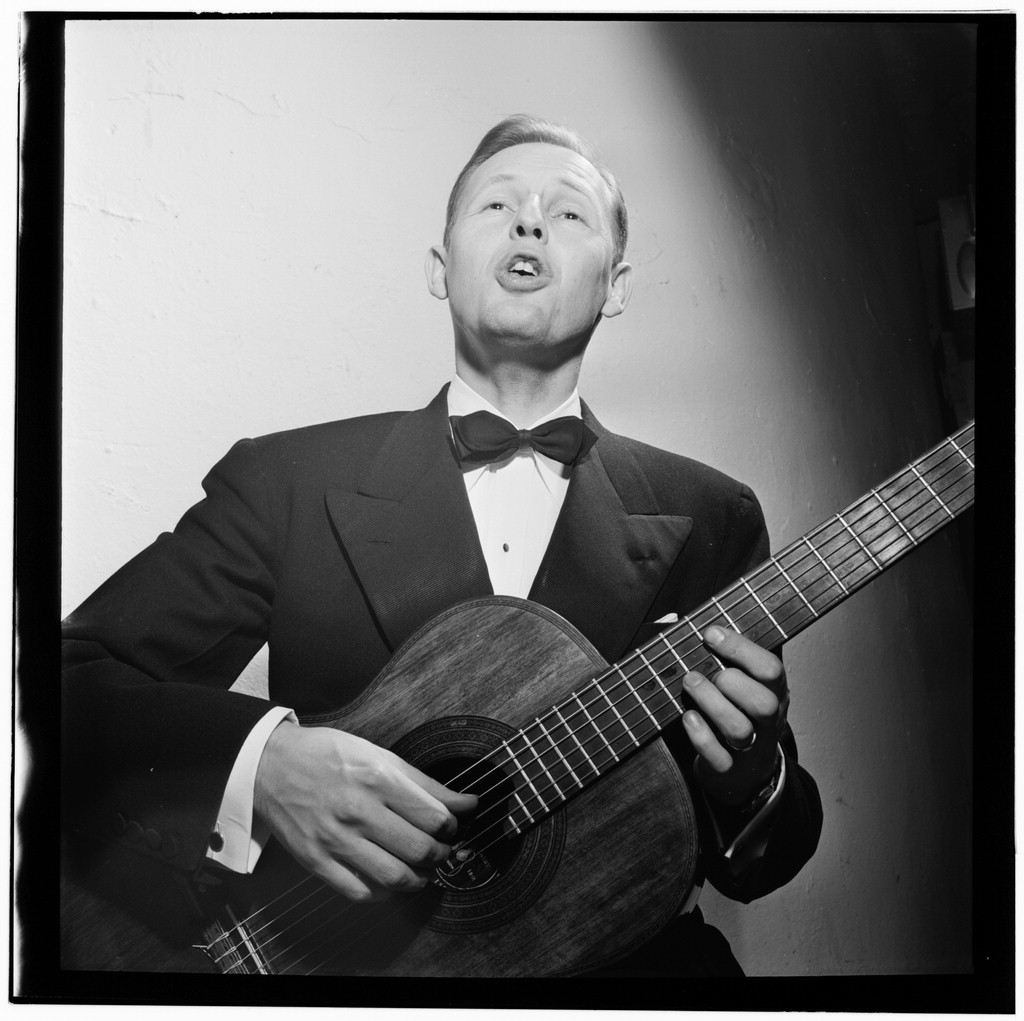
- Born: 6 October 1913; Leicester, England
- Died: 14 December 1991 (aged 78); Monterey, Massachusetts, United States
- Years active: 1940s-1990
- Spouses: Elizabeth Hoar Pepper (m. 1936; div. 1941) Melvene Ipcar (m. 1942)
- Children: 4
- Parent(s): Richard Stewart Dyer-Bennet; Miriam Wolcott Clapp

Richard Dyer-Bennet (6 October 1913 in Leicester, England – 14 December 1991 in Monterey, Massachusetts) was an English-born American folk singer (or his own preferred term, "minstrel"), recording artist, and voice teacher.

== Early life ==
He was born on 6 October 1913 in Leicester, England, as the eldest son of Miriam Wolcott Clapp and Richard Stewart Dyer-Bennet (1886–1983), a Major in the Leicester Regiment who was wounded twice while fighting in World War I. His paternal grandfather was Frederick Stewart Hotham Dyer-Bennet (a grandson of Sir Thomas Swinnerton Dyer, 9th Baronet). Dyer-Bennet grew up in Germany, Canada and California. He studied voice with Gertrude Wheeler Beckman and Sven Scholander.

The meeting with Scholander had a profound effect on Dyer-Bennet, who later recalled:

"He looked straight at me and spun tale after tale as though singing out of his own life. He sang of soldiers, sailors, young lovers; he sang dialogues between mother and daughter, altercations between birds and animals, descriptions of mountain and countryside. A pageant of the ages seemed to pass before my eyes, and it was all evoked by the husky voice of this old man and by his simple but exactly appropriate accompaniments on the lute."

== Career ==
His first album released included the song, The Lonesome Valley, used for many years to sign off the Midnight Special on WFMT each Saturday night. A favorite interview of Studs Terkel.

He had a stroke in 1972 paralyzing his left side and he stopped giving concerts.

=== Legacy ===
During his peak performance years, he gave 50 concerts a year. He recorded extensively for many labels, and eventually founded his own, Dyer-Bennet Records, recording in his own living room. The albums he recorded on his own label have been re-released on CD by Smithsonian Folkways. The CD Richard Dyer-Bennet 1 includes a biographical essay written by Dyer-Bennet's daughter, Bonnie, which highlights his progressive politics and his battle with a debilitating stroke in later life (he taught himself to play harp one-handed so that he could continue to perform and teach). A biography – Richard Dyer-Bennet: The Last Minstrel – by Paul O Jenkins was published in December 2009 by the University Press of Mississippi. The book chronicles Dyer-Bennet's eventful life and includes a foreword by his daughter.

== Personal life ==
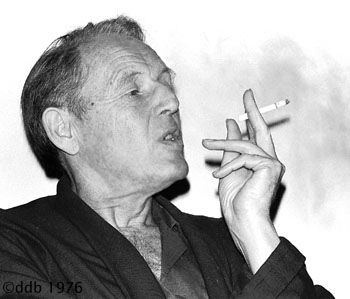
Dyer-Bennet at his home in Massachusetts, 1976

In 1936, Dyer-Bennet married Elizabeth Hoar Pepper. They divorced in 1941. He married Melvene Ipcar in 1942, they had two daughters Brooke and Bonnie.

He was heir presumptive of the Dyer baronets from 1983 until his death. (Note: Richard Dyer-Bennet, as heir presumptive to the Dyer baronetcy, predeceased Sir Peter Swinnerton-Dyer, 16th Baronet. Therefore, upon Sir Peter's death in 2018 the baronetcy passed to Richard's nephew (the son of his younger brother John Dyer-Bennet (1915–2002), former professor of mathematics at Carleton College), David Dyer-Bennett (b. 1954), as Richard had four daughters and no sons. David, who is married to writer Pamela Dean, the presumed seventeenth Baronet has yet to establish his claim and appear on the Official Roll of the Baronetage.) He died of cancer on 14 December 1991 at his home in Monterey, Massachusetts.

== Discography ==
Dyer-Bennet Records releases

- 1949: Richard Dyer-Bennet: Twentieth Century Minstrel (Decca DLP 5046)
- 1952: Folk Songs (Remington REP-1)
- 1955: Richard Dyer-Bennet 1
- 1956: Richard Dyer-Bennet 2
- 1956: Richard Dyer-Bennet 3
- 1957: Richard Dyer-Bennet 4
- 1958: Richard Dyer-Bennet 5: Requests
- 1958: Richard Dyer-Bennet 6: Songs With Young People in Mind
- 1958: Richard Dyer-Bennet 7: Beethoven Scottish and Irish Songs
- 1959: Richard Dyer-Bennet 8: Gems of Minstrelsy
- 1960: Richard Dyer-Bennet 9
- 1962: Richard Dyer-Bennet 10
- 1962: A Richard Dyer-Bennet Concert (Stinson Records)
- 1962: Mark Twain's 1601
- 1962: Richard Dyer-Bennet 11: Stephen Foster Songs
- 1964: Richard Dyer-Bennet 12: Songs of Ships, Seafaring Men, Watery Graves...and One Edible Rat
- 1964: Richard Dyer-Bennet 13: Stories and Songs for Children and Their Parents
- 1976: The Lovely Milleress: Die Schöne Müllerin (Schubert’s song cycle)

Folkways Records releases

- 1967: The Asch Recordings, 1939 to 1945 – Vol. 2 (Folkways Records)
- All the Dyer-Bennet Records releases have been re-released by Smithsonian Folkways.

== Bibliography ==
- 1970: The Richard Dyer-Bennet Folk Song Book. New York: Simon and Schuster.

== Videography ==
- 1980: The Odyssey on YouTube
