= William J. Biggy =

American politician

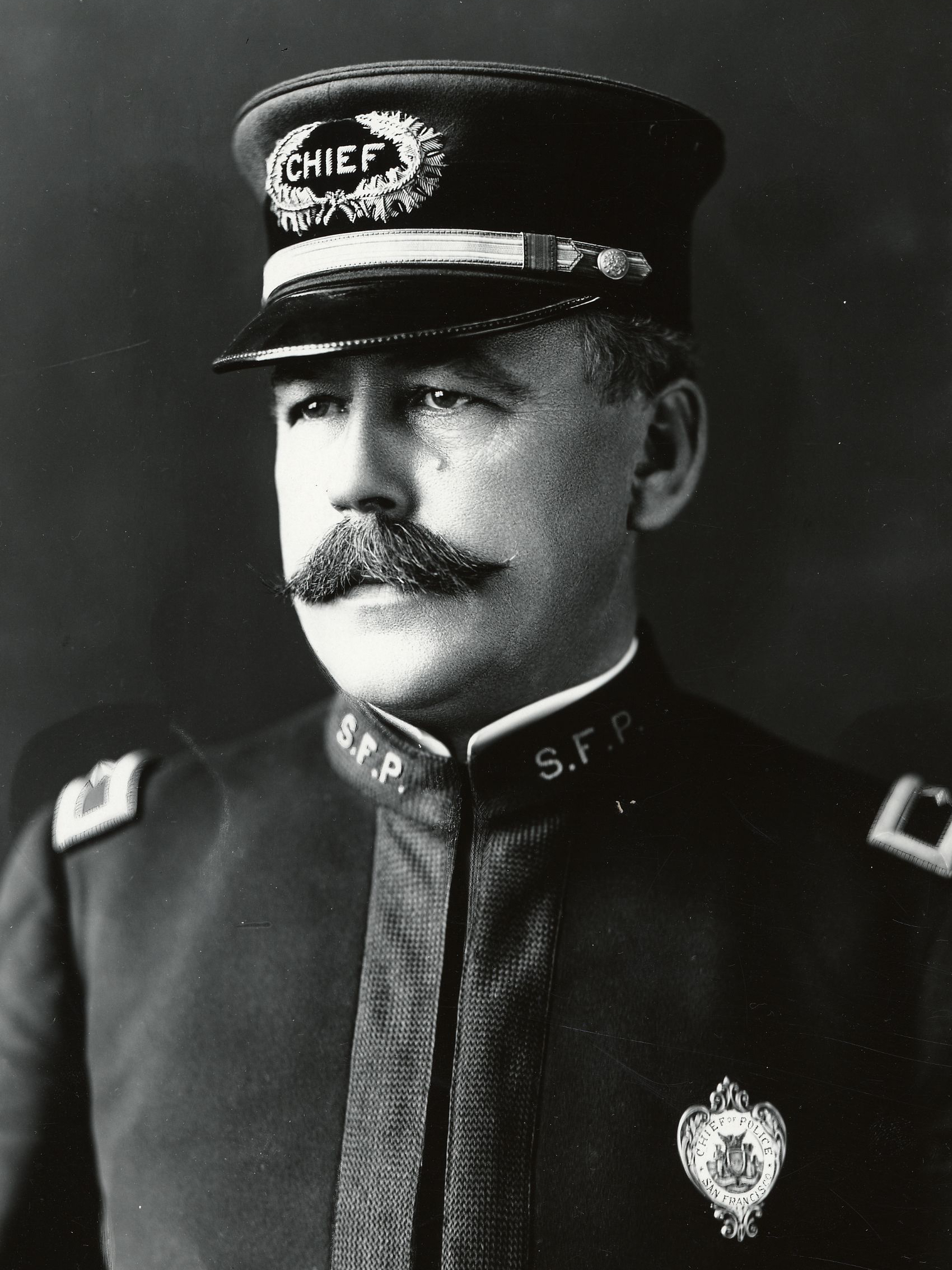
- Biggy c. 1908

Member of the California Senate from the 21st district
- In office January 2, 1893 – January 4, 1897
- Preceded by: W. O. Banks
- Succeeded by: Edward I. Wolfe

Personal details
- Born: January 23, 1859 San Francisco, California, U.S.
- Died: November 30, 1908 (aged 49) San Francisco, California, U.S.
- Party: Democratic
- Spouse(s): Mary Ellen Welch (d. 1895); Lucy Isabel McDonough
- Children: 2

William J. Biggy (January 23, 1859 – November 30, 1908) was the San Francisco Chief of Police from 1907 to 1908.

== California Senate ==
Biggy c. 1900

Biggy served in the California State Senate for the 21st district from 1893 to 1897.

== Chief of Police ==
He was appointed Chief of Police by Mayor Edward Robeson Taylor. Upon elevation to the position of Chief, Biggy declared, as do most new chiefs in San Francisco, that he would "clean up" the department. Declaring a "shake-up" the department has not experienced in many years on his first day in office. One of his first acts was to demote his predecessor, Chief Jeremiah F. Dinan to the rank of patrolman. (New York Times, September 21, 1907 pg. 1)

During the San Francisco graft prosecutions, Biggy was appointed Elisor by the court to hold Abraham Ruef in custody, which lasted more than a year, first in the temporary "little" Saint Francis Hotel and later in a house at 2849 Fillmore Street, after the sheriff and the coroner were disqualified.

After the non-fatal shooting of special prosecutor Francis J. Heney by an excused juror named Morris Haas, embarrassed by Heney as an ex-con during jury selection in the bribery trial of Abe Ruef, Biggy was criticized for overlooking the fact that Haas had a small derringer and committed suicide under police watch. Upon falling out with the men supporting the graft prosecution, Biggy was placed under surveillance by detectives employed by William J. Burns, a special agent to the prosecution.

Biggy went overboard from a police launch during a nighttime crossing of San Francisco Bay from Belvedere to San Francisco after discussing his resignation with police commissioner Hugo Keil. His body was found floating in the bay two weeks later. Because Biggy, a devout Catholic, was considered an unlikely suicide, the Coroner's Jury returned a verdict of accidental death although many people believed that he had committed suicide and the death remains unsolved.

== Sources ==
Walton Bean: Boss Ruef's San Francisco - UC Press 1952 CA
