= Gertrude Wheeler Beckman =

American teacher and author

- Born: September 29, 1879; Oakland, California, U.S.
- Died: August 8, 1961 (aged 81)
- Occupations: Author, composer, singing teacher
- Known for: Tools for Speaking and Singing (1955)

Gertrude Wheeler Beckman was an American author, composer, lyricist, singing teacher and phonologist. Her book on singing technique, Tools for Speaking and Singing, was published in 1955. She also inspired William Francis Giauque to study chemistry, the subject of his Nobel Prize in 1949.

== Biography ==
Beckman was born in Oakland, California in 1879, one of the three children of Charles C. and Angelina (or Angeline) (née Stetson) Wheeler. One of her brothers, Charles Stetson Wheeler, became a politician and attorney while the other, William Riley Wheeler, did not attend college.

Beckman became a singing teacher and phonologist. She married John W. Beckman, an electrochemical engineer who worked in Niagara Falls, New York for the American Cyanamid Company.

== Relationship with the Giauque family ==
Around 1908, the Beckmans employed Isabella Giauque as a seamstress. She had recently been widowed, leaving her family in difficult financial circumstances. Giauque asked Beckman to talk with her son, William Francis Giauque, about his plan to take a business course so that he could become employed as soon as possible, rather than do as his mother wanted and embark on longer studies leading to a college degree. Beckman described the contrasting careers of her two brothers to the young man, emphasising the value of education. As a result of this conversation, and later advice from Beckman, he started on a path that took him to study chemistry at University of California, Berkeley and then remain in academic science. He was eventually awarded the Nobel Prize for chemistry in 1949. The Beckmans later moved to Berkeley, California.

== Career ==
Beckman taught singing to opera and folk singers, including Richard Dyer-Bennet. Beckman and Dyer-Bennet met at a Christmas party when he was a university student and she persuaded him to take a music course, a subject in which he had already shown aptitude, rather than be focused on professional sports. She also encouraged him to meet the lute-player Sven Scholander by travelling to Sweden, which turned out to be important in Dyer-Bennet's development as a singer.

In addition, Beckman wrote music and lyrics for songs. At least one survives from 1911: We are here, LaFayette! In 1955, her book Tools for Speaking and Singing was published. The content was about techniques for singing, especially learning to produce the sounds as a reflexive action, rather than through direct control of muscles. The principles of this approach were described in the first half of the book, followed by practical applications. A reviewer considered that this was an excellent approach and description, although parts could have been written more clearly. Beckman had developed this approach with her friend and colleague, the soprano Ida Auer-Herbeck.

== Publications ==
- Gertrude Wheeler Beckman. Tools for Speaking and Singing (original author copyright 1948 Berkeley, Ca.) G. Schirmer, New York. 157pp
