= Rudolph Spreckels =

American businessman and social reformer (1872–1958)

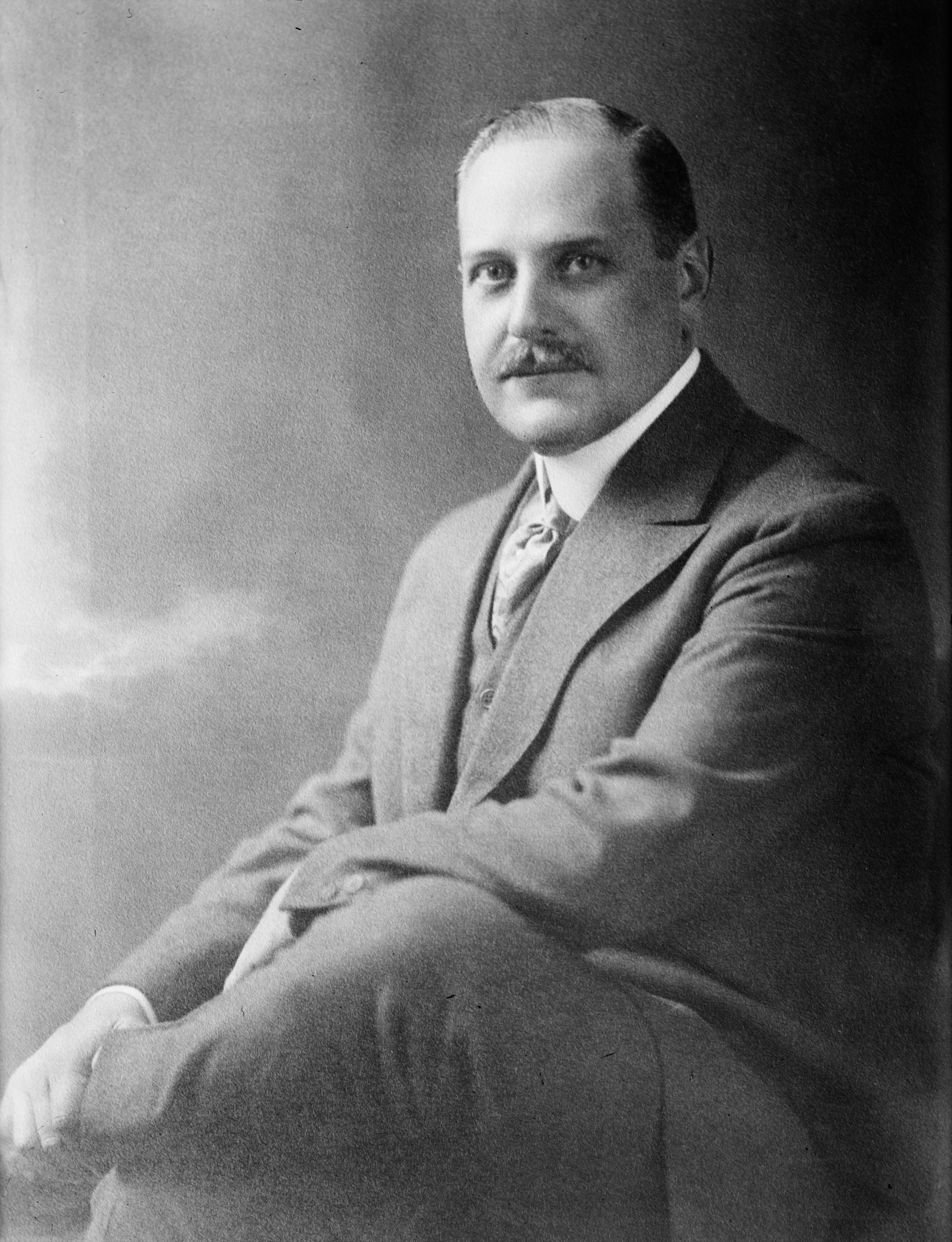
- Born: January 1, 1872; San Francisco, California, US
- Died: October 4, 1958 (aged 86); San Mateo, California, US
- Burial place: Cypress Lawn Memorial Park, Colma, California
- Occupations: banker, financier, sugar manufacturer
- Years active: 1889–1936
- Known for: Spearheading prosecution of San Francisco graft trials; 1906 San Francisco earthquake recovery leadership
- Spouse(s): Eleanor J. "Nellie" Jolliffe (b. 1868, m. 1895–1949)
- Children: 4 (3 surviving to adulthood)
- Parent(s): Claus Spreckels; Anna Christina Mangels
- Relatives: John D. Spreckels, Adolph B. Spreckels, Claus A. Spreckels (brothers)

Rudolph Spreckels (January 1, 1872 – October 4, 1958) was an American businessman and social reformer. He was the youngest son of German-American industrialist and California and Hawaii "Sugar King" Claus Spreckels.

== Rise in business ==
Rudolph had a complicated relationship with his father, beginning his career at age 17 as an assistant manager to his older brother Claus August "Gus" Spreckels, who was in charge of one of his father's sugar operations in Philadelphia. However, he would later become a business rival of his father's, partnering with Gus Spreckels in a hostile takeover of the Hawaiian Commercial & Sugar Company, which ran Claus Spreckels's extensive sugar plantation in Maui. They would soon resell the company to a competing Hawaiian sugar company, Alexander and Baldwin, profiting handsomely and becoming millionaires in their own right.

As head of the San Francisco Gas and Electric Company at the turn of the 19th century, he engaged in a ferocious price war with his father's utility company, the Independent Electric Light and Power Company. Rudolph and Gus would eventually reconcile with their father and, after his death in 1908, engaged in a bitter battle over the Spreckels inheritance against their brothers John D. and Adolph B. Spreckels.

== Civic reformer and Progressive activist ==
Beginning in the 1900s, Rudolph Spreckels would establish a reputation as a civic reformer. Following the 1906 San Francisco earthquake, he was an important member of the Committee of Fifty, a group of civic leaders in charge of responding to the immediate aftermath of the disaster and starting the process of rebuilding. He was given the specific task of leading the effort to restore electrical power and telephone service.

The "Big Four" graft prosecutors (left to right): Francis J. Heney, William J. Burns, Fremont Older, and Rudolph Spreckels.

He played a leading role in the investigation and prosecution of San Francisco political boss Abe Ruef and corrupt mayor Eugene Schmitz, financing the expense of the federal investigation of Ruef and Schmitz out of his own pocket. These efforts would lead to the San Francisco graft trials of the 1900s. It also earned him the enmity of much of the San Francisco business elite and he was expelled from the city's elite Bohemian Club. Conversely, he was also opposed by much of the San Francisco trade union movement, which viewed Spreckels as a wealthy interloper who had hand-picked Schmitz's successor Edward Robeson Taylor, who they saw as a business-friendly replacement to the pro-labor Schmitz.

A long-time supporter of the Progressive Republicanism of Theodore Roosevelt, in 1912 he switched his support to the Republican primary candidacy of Robert M. La Follette and became an important figure in the California Progressive Party, though he would become a supporter of Woodrow Wilson in the 1912 general election. He was offered the ambassadorship to Germany when Wilson became president, an offer the relentlessly independent Spreckels turned down. He would rejoin the reemergent Progressive Party of the 1920s, and was a leader of the 1924 La Follette campaign in California.

He was also leading backer of the 1920s Water and Power Initiatives, a series of California ballot initiatives in 1922, 1924, and 1926 (Note: The specific California ballot initiatives were: 1922 Proposition 19, 1924 Proposition 16, and 1926 Proposition 18.) that would have established a state board to set fixed water and power utility rates and to sell government bonds to finance state investment in water and energy infrastructure. In this effort, Spreckels and his supporters were heavily outspent by the state's utility companies, and the initiatives each went down to resounding defeat, with the "Yes" votes never topping 30%.

== Later business activities and bankruptcy ==
Spreckels continued his business activities during this time, serving as president of the First National Bank of San Francisco from 1906 to 1923. Through his career, he owned or held significant shares of companies involved in businesses as varied as real estate investment, radio manufacture (the Kolster Radio Corporation), and whaling. In 1927, he accepted an offer from Gus Spreckels to take over the presidency of his Federal Sugar Refining Company in Yonkers, New York, as Gus was retiring to Europe and wanted to leave the company to someone he trusted. In 1929, the company was reorganized as the Spreckels Sugar Corporation. (Note: Not to be mistaken for the similarly-named Spreckels Sugar Company of California that had been founded by Claus Spreckels in 1899, which, by 1929, was largely owned by Rudolph's sister-in-law Alma de Bretteville Spreckels.) In spite of his vast wealth (in 1929 alone, Spreckels claimed to have made nearly 18 million dollars (about 330 million in 2025 dollars)), he heavily extended his credit in order to finance his businesses, and with huge losses in the Wall Street crash of 1929, his debts began to outpace his assets. The Spreckels Sugar Corporation folded in 1930 and he declared personal bankruptcy in 1936.

== Later years and death ==
He managed to hold onto his Hillsborough, California mansion by selling it to his wife, Nellie, who had her own personal wealth that was not lost with her husband's fortune. They managed to live off her assets until her death in 1949. After his wife's passing, Spreckels lived in more humble circumstances, drawing upon a modest inheritance from his wife and residing in a three-bedroom apartment in nearby San Mateo, California, where he died in 1958. In an interview conducted in 1951, he stated, "Except for my bereavement over the death of my wife, I think I have never been happier in my life than I am now....Some financiers jumped out of windows when they found themselves bankrupt. I never lost a night's sleep over it."

== See also ==
Spreckels family
