= Charles Stetson Wheeler =

American attorney

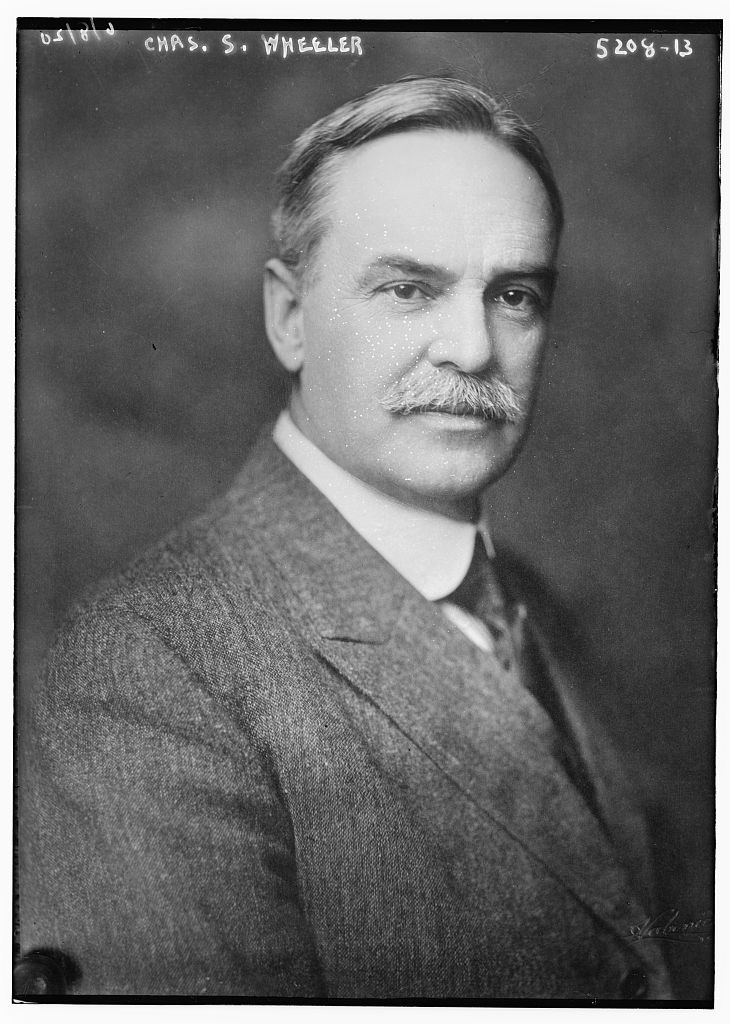
- Wheeler circa 1920
- Born: December 12, 1863; Oakland, California, U.S.
- Died: April 27, 1923 (aged 59); San Francisco, California, U.S.
- Education: University of California, Berkeley; University of California, Hastings College of the Law
- Occupations: Attorney, Regent of the University of California

Charles Stetson Wheeler (December 12, 1863 – April 27, 1923) was an American attorney who served as a Regent of the University of California, and he was a member of the Committee of Fifty working to maintain order after the devastating fire following the earthquake of 1906 in San Francisco. Wheeler was active in Republican Party politics.

== Biography ==
Wheeler was born in Oakland, California, on December 12, 1863. His parents were Charles C. Wheeler from Norridgewock, Maine, and the former Angelina (or Angeline) Stetson from Kingston, Massachusetts. The parents were married in the gold rush town of Columbia, California, on April 17, 1859. Wheeler was raised in Oakland and attended public schools. In 1879 while he was in high school, his sister Gertrude Wheeler was born; she later married John W. Beckman and became a singing teacher, phonologist and inventor. Wheeler was raised alongside a brother who never sought higher education. In 1884, Wheeler graduated with a Bachelor of Laws degree from the University of California, and began working in Oakland in the law office of John Henry Boalt. Concurrently, he studied advanced law at Hastings College of the Law in San Francisco and graduated in 1886, the same year he advanced to the bar.

As an attorney, Wheeler took up residence in San Francisco and continued with the law firm Garber, Boalt and Bishop. In 1892, Wheeler was made partner. After the deaths of Boalt and Judge John R. Garber, the firm was reconstituted as Bishop, Wheeler and Hoefler. In 1904, Wheeler headed his own firm, with no partners. In 1912 he took on a partner: attorney John F. Bowie, some fifteen years younger. By 1918, Wheeler worked occasionally with his son, Charles S. Wheeler Jr, as co-counsel. Wheeler's clients included the First National Bank, the Bank of British North America, the Barron Estate Co., and the First Federal Trust Co. of San Francisco. He specialized in probate law, mining claims, corporate law and real estate law; the office was on 14 Montgomery Street. From 1920 to 1923, Wheeler partnered with his son.

Wheeler was attorney to Phoebe Apperson Hearst, and to Elizabeth Boalt after the death of her husband, Wheeler's mentor John H. Boalt. Wheeler advised the two women in their gifts to the University of California School of Law, instituting the Hearst architectural plan including Hearst Memorial Mining Building and Boalt Hall of Law. When the plans were celebrated in early 1906, Wheeler announced a gift of $250,000 that he would use to endow a law professorship.

When Wheeler died on April 27, 1923, a number of memorial motions were made in various courts. These motions were combined into the 1924 book Memorial motions in court upon the death of Charles Stetson Wheeler. One of them was as follows: "Mr. Wheeler was a man, in every sense of the word. A stranger coming within our gates meeting him on the street and observing him, his wonderful physique, his wonderful bearing, at once would exclaim, 'What man is this?'"

== Society and politics ==
In college, Wheeler joined the fraternity Beta Theta Pi and was later given honorary membership in Phi Delta Phi. He joined the San Francisco Art Association, the Bohemian Club, the Pacific-Union Club, the Olympic Club, and the Commonwealth Club, among others.

Wheeler served as a Regent of the University of California from 1892 to 1896, from 1902 to 1907, and again from 1911 to 1923.

After the 1906 San Francisco earthquake, Wheeler served on the Committee of Fifty, a group of prominent citizens who quickly took control of reconstruction when it became clear the San Francisco Board of Supervisors was unable. Wheeler held the position of secretary of the Relief Committee. In December 1908, he reported that the Relief Committee, because of its success in carrying out its mission, would be dissolved at the first of the year. He noted that $9.5 million had been distributed to those in need, and that the committee's administration costs had been 2% of that. The relief work had provided approximately 8,000 homes for 30,000 people.

Prior to the 1912 United States presidential election, Wheeler publicly debated the former California governor James N. Gillett on the question of which Republican nominee deserved the backing of his party, to be decided at the primary elections. Wheeler spoke for Theodore Roosevelt while Gillett argued for incumbent William Howard Taft. Wheeler said Taft was "blind to the signs of the times", the candidate of "men satisfied with the old political methods." In the event, Taft won the primary but Roosevelt ran anyway as a third-party candidate, splitting the Republican vote to allow Woodrow Wilson to gain the presidency. In 1920, Wheeler traveled to Chicago to serve as alternate delegate for California at the Republican National Convention. The California delegation put Wheeler on the podium to give a rousing speech for the nomination of California-born candidate Hiram Johnson who had been Roosevelt's running mate in 1912.

== Personal life ==
Wheeler married fine artist Lillian Marsh, a few months his senior. She studied art with William Keith in San Francisco in the 1890s. She lived in that city all her life. After her husband's death, she took up residence at the Fairmont Hotel. She died in 1952.

Wheeler's offspring include son Charles Stetson Wheeler Jr., and daughters Elizabeth, Jean, Lilias and Olive B.; all spending summers together with their parents in remote Northern California as reported in 1910.

A grandson, outdoorsman Charles ("Charley") Stetson Wheeler III, married Kathryn ("Katie") Anita Lillard (1920-2003) of the Irvine family of Southern California. Charley headed cattle operations for the Irvine Company from 1953 to 1977, then became the company's corporate secretary until his death in 1993. Katie joined the board of the James Irvine Foundation in 1950, guiding its decisions in making grants for the next half century until her death in 2003. A branch of the Orange County Public Libraries system in Irvine was built to memorialize her: The Katie Wheeler Branch Library.

=== Wheeler Ranch ===
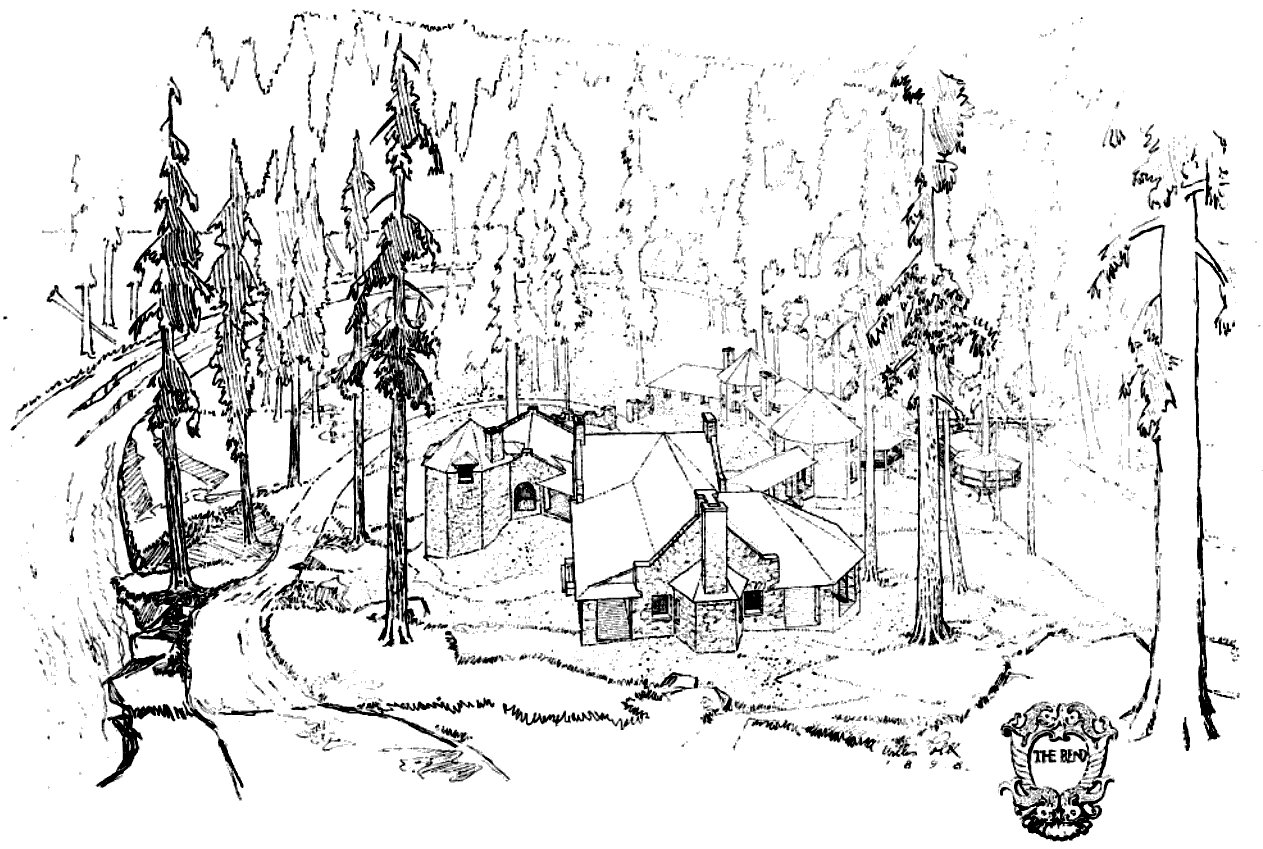
The Bend, 1899, designed by Willis Polk

In 1899 from innkeeper Lydia Sisson, the widow of landowner and outdoorsman Justin Sisson, Wheeler bought extensive land called "The Bend" in Siskiyou County, in the Cascade Range south by southeast of Mount Shasta on the McCloud River. He called this holding the Wheeler Ranch, and he built a hunting lodge on the river at Horseshoe Bend—its cornerstone laid in 1899. The lodge was designed by San Francisco architect Willis Polk, and included an 800-book library with room for hundreds of Native American baskets. Wheeler directed Polk to give the lodge a "fish tower"—a high study with a view, and two windows which were aquariums containing local trout. A Latin inscription over the entrance indicated this room was a temple to fishing: piscatoribus sacrum. The Wheeler family stayed at the ranch many a summer.

In 1900, Wheeler invited his client Phoebe Hearst to visit Wheeler Ranch with his family for the summer. Hearst asked if she could purchase the land, but Wheeler declined. Insistent, Hearst came to an arrangement whereby she would purchase a 99-year lease on part of the land, and she also purchased adjoining land held by Edward Clark who called it Wyntoon. Hearst applied the name Wyntoon to her new lease and in 1901 contracted for a magnificent seven-story house to be built, one designed by Bernard Maybeck in the Gothic style of a Rhine River castle. Wheeler was "privately furious" with the extravagant plans, as he and Hearst had previously agreed her building would be modest. She built other structures including a cottage for overflow guests, another "honeymoon cottage", and a separate building housing the kitchen facilities. The castle was finished in 1904.

Wheeler retained the part of Wheeler Ranch that was not leased to Hearst, including the hunting lodge. In 1911, Wheeler invited Austro-Hungarian artist and naturalist Edward Stuhl and his wife Rosie to live on the property; they made extensive studies of plant and animal life in the area, and collected many hundreds of specimens. Stuhl, an avid mountain climber, published Wildflowers of Mount Shasta from his base at Wheeler Ranch. After Wheeler's death, Stuhl served as custodian of the ranch. William Randolph Hearst bought Wyntoon outright from Wheeler Ranch in 1929, and in 1934 bought Wheeler Ranch.
