= Sunnyside Plantation =

Historic plantation in Chicot County, Arkansas

- Town/City: Lake Village
- State: Arkansas
- Province: Chicot County
- Coordinates: 33°19′N 91°14′W
- Established: c. 1820–1830
- Disestablished: 1945
- Owner: Abner Johnson (c. 1820–1840); Elisha Worthington(1840–1866); Robert P. Pepper (1866–1868); William Starling (1868–1881); John C. Calhoun II (1881–c. 1884)

The Sunnyside Plantation was a former cotton plantation and is a historic site, located near Lake Village in Chicot County, Arkansas, in the Arkansas Delta region.

Built as a cotton plantation in the Antebellum South, it was farmed using the forced labor of enslaved African Americans. After the American Civil War in 1865, freedmen farmed it. From the 1890s to the 1910s, the plantation used convict laborers and employed immigrants from Northern Italy, many of whom were subject to peonage. They were later replaced by Black sharecroppers. The plantation was closed down and it was broken up in the 1940s. Nowadays, only a historical marker reminds Lake Village residents and visitors of its history.

== History ==
The land belonged to Native Americans. In the seventeenth century, the area was claimed by France which founded nearby Arkansas Post. In the 18th century, France ceded the Louisiana territory to Spain, who transferred governance back to Napoleonic France. In 1803, Emperor Napoleon sold it to the United States as part of the Louisiana Purchase.

The United established the Arkansas Territory in 1819 out of part of the greater territory of the Louisiana Purchase. A year later, in 1820, slavery, which had been legal under the French since the late 18th century, was limited in the United States territories to south of Missouri as a result of the Missouri Compromise.

=== Early years of Sunnyside Plantation ===
The land near modern-day Lake Village in Chicot County, Arkansas was acquired in the 1820s and 1830s by Abner Johnson, a planter from Kentucky. Johnson served as the Sheriff of Chicot County from 1830 to 1834. His plantation spanned 2,200 acres, with 42 African American slaves working in the cotton fields. By 1836, the Arkansas Territory had become a state of the United States of America.

In 1840, the plantation was acquired by Elisha Worthington for US$60,000. Worthington also agreed to give 250 bales of cotton to Johnson annually for the next ten years. Alongside the land and several buildings, Worthington purchased 42 of Johnson's slaves in the transaction. He built a dock on the Mississippi River to facilitate the transportation of cotton.

During the American Civil War of 1861–1865, the plantation was badly damaged by Union Army forces. Worthington moved his slaves and livestock to Texas from 1862 to 1865, and let his two mulatto children, including his son James W. Mason, take care of the land. On June 5, 1864, Union forces invaded the plantation to disrupt landings on the Mississippi River by the Confederate States Army. Meanwhile, on June 5–6, the Battle of Old River Lake, also known as the Battle of Ditch Bayou, took place not far from the plantation. By 1865, it had been declared "abandoned land" by the Freedmen's Bureau. Even though Worthington was pardoned by President Andrew Johnson, he decided to sell his plantation, partly due to the loss of his workforce, the dwindling price of cotton, and his worsening health.

=== Reconstruction ===
In 1866, Worthington sold the plantation to Robert P. Pepper of Kentucky. Two years later, in 1868, it was acquired by Major William Starling of the William Starling Company, through inheritance.

In 1881, the plantation was acquired by John C. Calhoun II, the grandson of John C. Calhoun, and his brother, Patrick Calhoun. The brothers were seen as prominent financiers and builders of the "New South". Together, they founded the Calhoun Land Company, and attempted to bring former slaves back to their old plantations. John C. Calhoun II testified before the United States Senate Committee on Education and Labor in September 1883, explaining that his goal was to empower freedmen to save and become self-sufficient tenants. The testimony was so well-received that it was published by civil rights leader Timothy Thomas Fortune in his 1884 Black and White: Land, Labor, and Politics. In reality, while some freedmen managed to become tenants, other were sharecroppers, or even wage laborers.

By the mid-1880s, the Calhoun brothers decided to sell the plantation, partly because of the flood of 1882.

== Labor ==
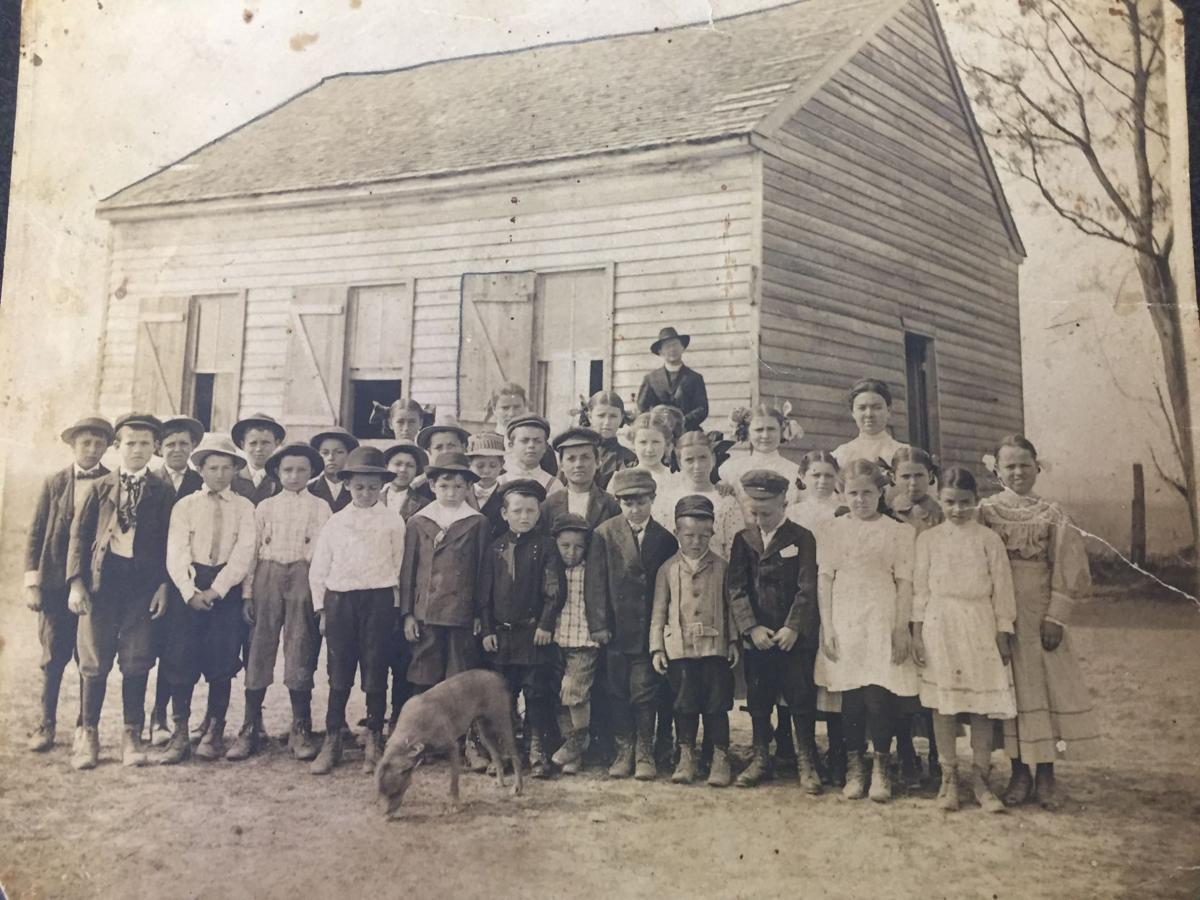
Italian children at the Sunnyside School (1911), part of the Sunnyside Plantation

=== Convict laborers and Italian immigrant laborers ===
By 1886, it was acquired by the New York banker Austin Corbin as repayment of debt incurred by Calhoun. Corbin built a mansion, called Corbin House, and moored his boat, Austin Corbin, on Lake Chicot. He added a railroad from the cotton fields to the cotton gin to save time and boost production. He also established a telephone line to Greenville, Mississippi, the county seat of nearby Washington County, Mississippi, home to the cotton industry. However, most freedmen refused to work for Corbin, because he was not a Southerner but a carpetbagger.

In 1894, Corbin entered into an agreement with the state of Arkansas to use convict laborers. He was given 250 convicts, who picked cotton on the plantation. The profits were split between Corbin and the state. With the help of Emanuele Ruspoli, 1st Prince of Poggio Suasa, who served as the Mayor of Rome from 1892 to 1899, Corbin brought Italian immigrants led by Pietro Bandini to work on the plantation. The immigrants came from Marche, Emilia and Veneto, setting sail from Genoa and arriving in New Orleans, Louisiana. They lived in a house on their own twelve-and-a-half acre lots of cotton, which they were obligated to pay back over the next twenty years, with an annual rate of five percent. Each immigrant picked the cotton on his own lot, which Corbin agreed to purchase. When Corbin died in 1896, many Italians stayed on the plantation. Moreover, Prince Ruspoli visited the plantation in 1896.

In December 1898, Corbin's heirs leased the plantation to Hamilton R. Hawkins, Orlando B. Crittenden, Morris Rosenstock, and Leroy Percy. Percy, a prominent planter from Greenville, Mississippi, suggested that European peasants were more industrious than Blacks. However, the businessmen were accused of "peonage." In 1907, after hearing many complaints from immigrants, Edmondo Mayor des Planches, the Italian ambassador to the United States, visited the plantation. As he explained in his 1913 report, Attraverso gli Stati Uniti per L'Emigrazione Italiana, he was unimpressed by Percy's rosy rewriting of reality.

Shortly afterward, Mary Grace Quackenbos, an attorney with the US Department of Justice, visited the plantation to look into repeated reports of peonage. In her report, she agreed that it was practised and added that only prosecution could put an end to it. Not surprisingly, Percy disagreed with her and suggested that the Italian immigrants could save a lot of money from their labor. Albert Bushnell Hart, a professor of history at Harvard University, agreed with Percy. Congressman Benjamin G. Humphreys II agreed with them and argued that immigrants could pay off their debts by selling their cotton. limited economic opportunities in Northern Italy caused not much to be done to support Quackenbos's views. Prosecution was stopped in its tracks, possibly because of Percy's friendship with US President Theodore Roosevelt with whom he had hunted bears on his Smedes Plantation, in Mississippi. Over the years, many of the Italian workers moved to St. James, Missouri, Irondale, Alabama and Tontitown, Arkansas. Others moved to Birmingham, Alabama, where they worked in coal and iron mines.

Sweet Hope (Guernica Editions, 2011), a historical novel by Mary Bucci Bush, tells the story of Italian immigrants working on a Mississippi Delta cotton plantation in the early 1900s. It is based on the experiences of Bush's grandmother, who worked on the Sunnyside Plantation as a child.

=== Sharecroppers and dissolution ===
By the 1910s, the Italian laborers were replaced by Black sharecroppers. In 1920, the plantation was acquired by W.H. and J.C. Baird. Four years later, it was acquired by the Kansas City Life Insurance Company at an auction. In 1935, they leased it to the Arkansas Rural Rehabilitation Corporation. The plantation was visited by the Federal Writers' Project in the late 1930s.

The plantation was finally broken up, as tracts of land were sold to individual buyers from 1941 to 1945, in the midst of World War II. Nowadays, only a historical marker reminds residents and visitors of its lost history.
