= Austin Corbin =

American railroad executive

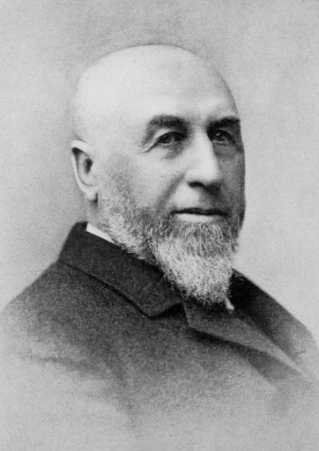
- Born: July 11, 1827; Newport, New Hampshire, U.S.
- Died: June 4, 1896 (aged 68); Newport, New Hampshire, U.S.
- Resting place: Woodlawn Cemetery (The Bronx, New York City)
- Occupations: Banking and railroad businessman
- Spouse: Hannah Maria Wheeler
- Children: Austin Corbin, Isabella Corbin Edgell, Anna Corbin Borrowe, Mary Corbin Champollion
- Parent(s): Capt. Austin and Mary (Chase) Corbin
- Relatives: Daniel Chase Corbin (brother), René Chéronnet-Champollion (son-in-law), Salmon P. Chase (cousin)

Austin Corbin (July 11, 1827 – June 4, 1896) was a 19th-century American banking and railroad entrepreneur. He consolidated the rail lines on Long Island, bringing them under the profitable umbrella of the Long Island Rail Road (LIRR).

He was the owner of Manhattan Beach, a resort in Brooklyn, New York City, from which he barred Jews. He was also the owner of the Sunnyside Plantation in Chicot County, Arkansas, from 1886 to his death in 1896, where he used convict laborers and later brought Italian immigrants to work on the land.

== Early life and education ==
Corbin was born on July 11, 1827, in Newport, New Hampshire, to Capt. Austin and Mary (Chase) Corbin, one of three siblings to survive infancy, along with Lois Corbin Dunton (23 December 1819 – 7 July 1893), and Daniel Chase Corbin (1 October 1832 – 29 June 1918). His brother, Daniel, was also a businessman, involved in banking and railroads, who contributed to the early growth of Spokane, Washington.

== Career ==
Corbin practiced law in his hometown until 1851, when he moved to Davenport, Iowa.

In 1854, he became a partner of the Macklot & Corbin banking firm, the only bank in Davenport to not suspend payments in the 1857 financial panic. This success set him up to start the first national bank, when his cousin, Secretary of the Treasury Salmon P. Chase, established the national banking system early in the Civil War. By 1865, when Corbin moved to New York City, he was considered wealthy.

In New York City, he founded the Corbin Banking Company, which he leveraged into a successful banking firm, which funded his diversifying into resorts and railroads. In 1873, while following doctors' advice of ocean air for his ill son on Coney Island, Corbin recognized the area as an untapped natural location for a summer resort, and proceeded to purchase 500 acres (200 ha) over the next three years, opening a large hotel and a new railway system to deliver New Yorkers to the resort in 1878. Both were an instant success, rewarding Corbin and his associates substantially. He next turned his attention to, in contemporary views, the neglected Long Island area. In 1881, he acquired and consolidated the Long Island Rail Road (LIRR) with the South Side Railroad of Long Island known as the "Montauk" line and Flushing and North Side railroads. Corbin greatly improved the railroad's infrastructure, which had fallen into disrepair after a period of cutthroat competition had thrown all the island's railroads into bankruptcy.

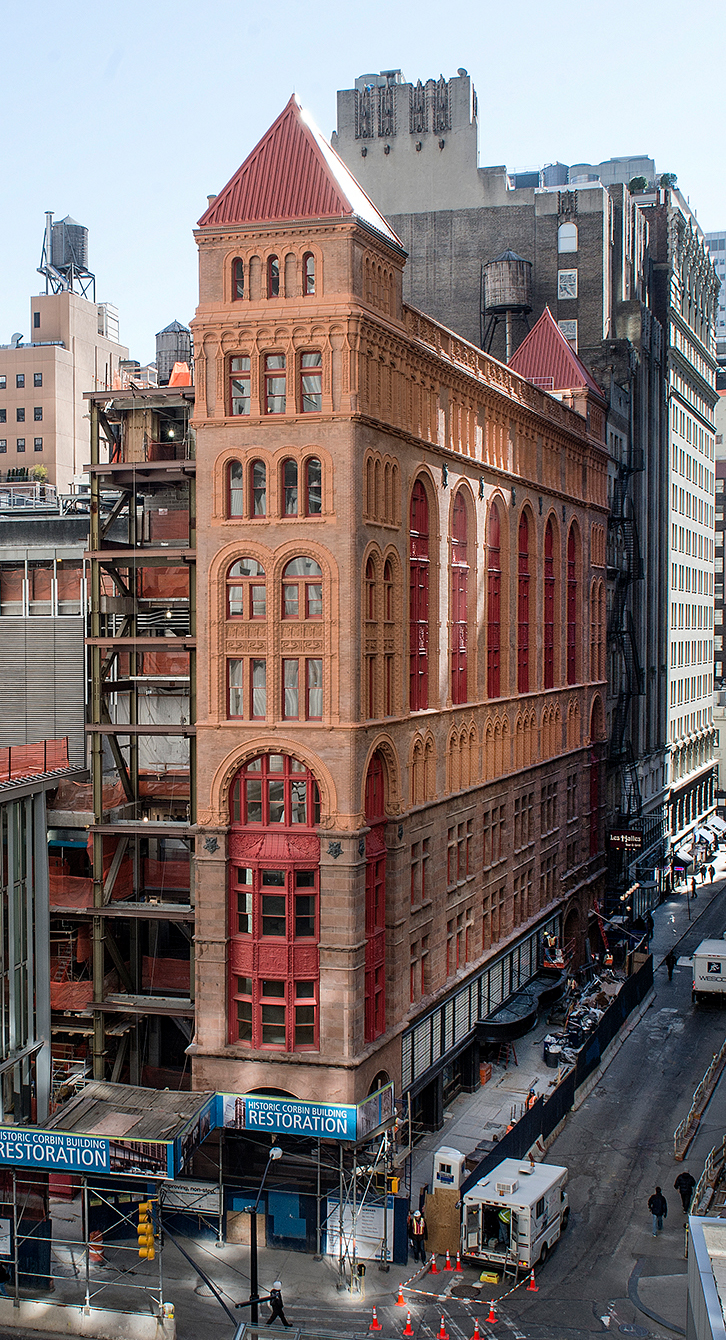
Corbin Building, Manhattan

Corbin's most ambitious plan was the 20-mile (32 km) extension of the rail line from Bridgehampton to Montauk, New York, where he planned to open a deepwater port so that trans-Atlantic passengers could shave half a day off their voyages by taking express trains 114 miles (180 km) from Montauk station (which would open in 1895) to New York City. However, the plan never materialized, as the planned port at Fort Pond Bay in Montauk could not be dredged to handle the seagoing vessels.

Corbin and his cohorts infamously strong-armed the Montaukett tribe out of nearly 10,000 acres (40 km^{2}) they owned around Montauk. The tribe is still seeking compensation for its losses. Relics from the tribe are still visible at Camp Wikoff which the LIRR sold the government and where Theodore Roosevelt and his Rough Riders were quarantined after returning from the Spanish–American War.

Corbin acquired the Sunnyside Plantation in Chicot County, Arkansas, from John C. Calhoun II, the grandson of John C. Calhoun and brother of Patrick Calhoun, in 1886. In 1894, he entered into an agreement with the state of Arkansas whereby he was given 250 convict laborers to pick cotton for him on the plantation. The profits were shared between Corbin and the state.

Meanwhile, with the help of Emanuele Ruspoli, 1st Prince of Poggio Suasa, who served as the Mayor of Rome from 1892 to 1899, he brought Italian immigrants to work on the plantation. However, Corbin was accused of "peonage."

Corbin was the owner of the resort of Manhattan Beach, Brooklyn. An antisemite, he banned Jews from patronizing the resort. He also developed the Corbin Building in Manhattan between 1888 and 1889.

== Personal life ==
He resided in a mansion in Newport, New Hampshire. He also owned a summer estate in North Babylon, New York along the shores of what is known today as Deer Lake in the Parkdale Estates neighborhood. His daughter married René Chéronnet-Champollion, a French artist and grandson of Jean-François Champollion.

Corbin built his large New Hampshire estate, and bought out his neighbors’ farms to create an 22,000 acre wildlife game preserve, which became a prestigious private hunting park and hosted notable guests, including Theodore Roosevelt, the Prince of Wales, Cornelius Vanderbilt, Joe Dimaggio, Rudyard Kipling, and Augustus Saint Gaudens.") The preserve was stocked with boar, bighorn sheep, antelope, elk, Chinese pheasant, and other imported animals, but, most importantly, with some 150 bison. This enabled Corbin's park naturalist Ernest Harold Baynes to play a vital part in the saving of the American bison from extinction, a contribution highlighted in the 2023 Ken Burns PBS documentary The American Buffalo.

== Death and legacy ==
Corbin died in a carriage accident near his country home in New Hampshire in 1896 at age 68. He is buried in Woodlawn Cemetery in the Bronx.

Austin Street in Forest Hills was named after Corbin.

== See also ==
- List of railroad executives

Preceded by Thomas R. Sharp	President of Long Island Rail Road; 1881 – 1896	Succeeded by William H. Baldwin
