= Elisha Worthington =

American planter (d. 1873)

- Reconstruction era map showing Worthington landholdings along the Mississippi River in Arkansas
- Died: 1873
- Occupation: Planter
- Children: James W. Mason; Fannie Mason

Elisha Worthington was an American planter and large slaveholder in the Antebellum South. He was the owner of the Sunnyside Plantation in Chicot County, Arkansas.

== Early life ==
Elisha Worthington was born in Kentucky.

== Career ==
He acquired the Sunnyside Plantation in Chicot County from Abner Johnson in 1840. He also owned the Redleaf Plantation, the Meanie Plantation (a.k.a. the So So Plantation or the Rose Plantation), and the Eminence Plantation. By 1860, he owned 543 African slaves and 12,000 acres of land in Chicot County.

In 1862, in the midst of the American Civil War, Worthington moved his slaves and livestock to Texas. He returned to Chicot County at the end of the war, in 1865. He was pardoned by President Andrew Johnson on January 31, 1866.

In 1866, Worthington sold his Sunnyside plantation to Robert P. Pepper of Kentucky. With the proceeds of the sale, he paid back loans he had taken from Wade Hampton and Abraham Van Buren. Meanwhile, he moved into his Redleaf Plantation with his daughter Martha.

== Personal life ==
Elisha Worthington had two children, son James W. Mason (aka James Mason Worthington) and daughter Martha W Mason. Their mother was a slave. Worthington sent both James and Martha to Oberlin College preparatory school in Ohio. James was a student at Oberlin from 1855 to 1858. Martha was a student there from 1860 to 1861.

== Death ==
He died in 1873.
