= James W. Mason =

American politician and postmaster

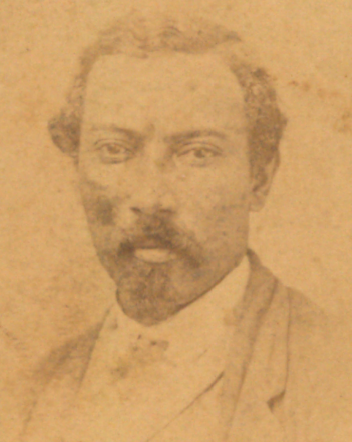
- Born: c. 1841; Chicot County, Arkansas
- Died: November 1874 (aged 32–33)
- Occupation: Politician
- Parent: Elisha Worthington

James Worthington Mason (c. 1841 – November 1874) was a state senator, sheriff, and postmaster in Arkansas. In 1868 he was one of the first six African Americans to serve in the Arkansas House. He also served in the Arkansas Senate and was the first African American postmaster in the United States.

== Early life ==
James W. Mason was born in about 1841 in Chicot County, Arkansas. His father, Elisha Worthington, was a Kentucky-born large landowner and the owner of the Sunnyside Plantation in Chicot County. His mother was an African slave owned by his father. As a result, he was a mulatto. He had a sister, Martha. They were both recognized by their father, and they studied at Oberlin College in Ohio. He also studied in France.

== Career ==
Mason was appointed as the postmaster of Sunnyside in 1867, becoming the first documented African-American postmaster in the United States.

He served as a member of the Arkansas Senate from 1868 to 1869.

He was appointed as Consul General to Liberia on March 29, 1870. However, he failed to fill the position.

He served in the Arkansas Senate a second time, from 1871 to 1872. He then served as the Sheriff of Chicot County from 1872 to 1874. In the summer of 1873, he was arrested under the suspicion of inciting a race war in the county. The judge, Colonel John A. Williams, dismissed the trial.

== Personal life ==
He married Rachel, who was also of mixed race. They had a daughter, Fannie. Mason died in late November 1874.
