= Abe Ruef =

American lawyer and politician (1864–1936)

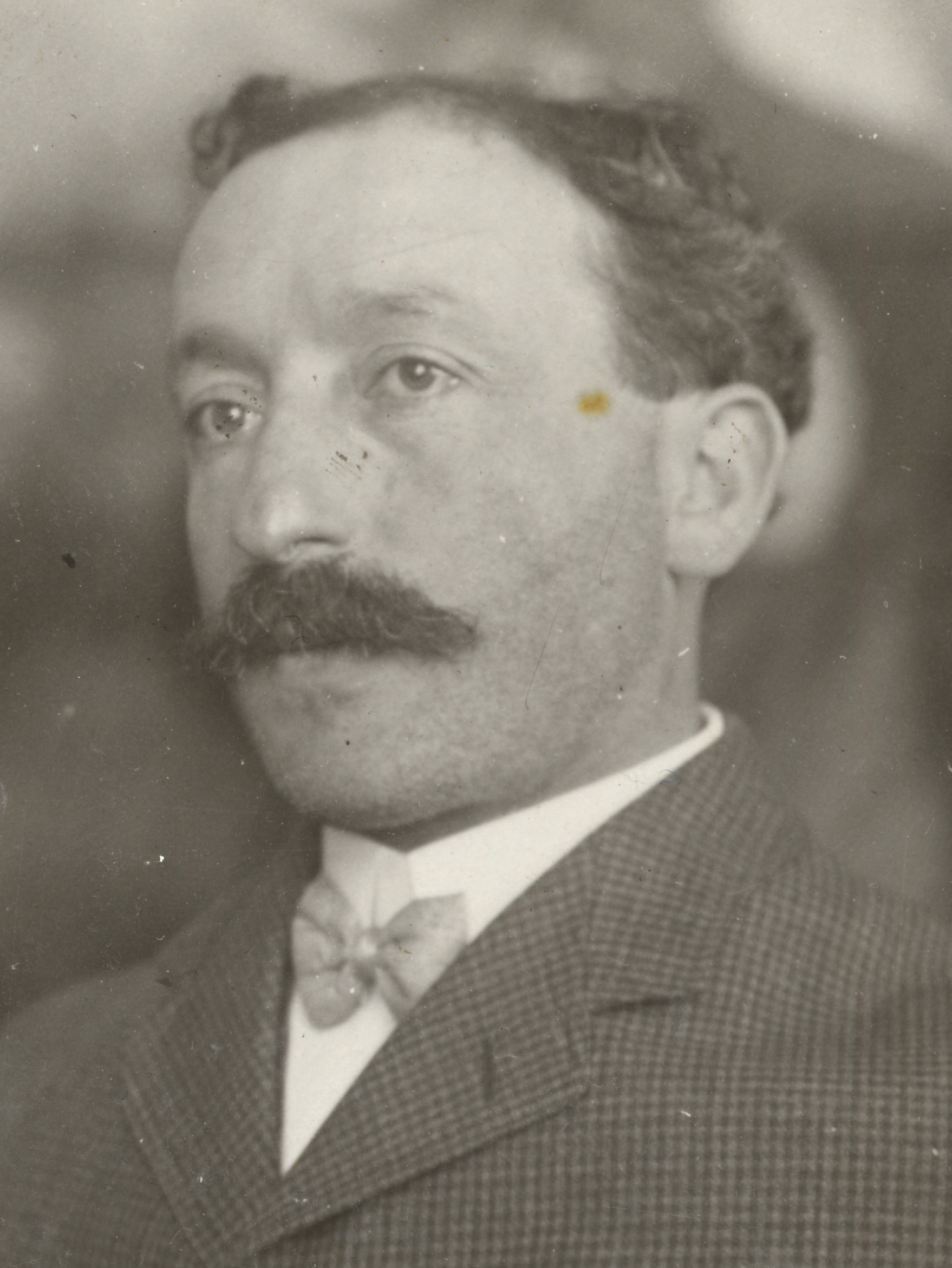
- Ruef in 1907

District Attorney of San Francisco
- Disputed; October 25, 1906 – November 16, 1906
- Appointed by: James L. Gallagher
- Preceded by: William H. Langdon
- Succeeded by: William H. Langdon

Personal details
- Born: September 2, 1864 San Francisco, California, U.S.
- Died: February 29, 1936 (aged 71) San Francisco, California, U.S.
- Party: Republican; Union Labor
- Education: University of California (B.A.); Hastings College (L.L.B.)
- Criminal information
- Status: Released in 1915
- Conviction: Bribery
- Penalty: 14 years in prison

Abraham Ruef (September 2, 1864 – February 29, 1936), nicknamed the "Curly Boss", was an American attorney and politician who gained notoriety as the political boss behind the Union Labor Party and Eugene Schmitz, who served as the 26th mayor of San Francisco from 1902 to 1907. Their administration is remembered for its response to the 1906 San Francisco earthquake and its downfall during the San Francisco graft trials.

== Education and influences ==
Ruef aged 18.

Ruef was born Abraham Rueff of parents from a French–Jewish background. He was a bright student and, when barely fourteen, began studying at the University of California, Berkeley, majoring in classical studies. While attending the university, he developed an interest in fighting the rampant corruption that was endemic to local and national politics at the time. With some fellow students, he formed the "Municipal Reform League". He corresponded with like-minded individuals across the nation, including Theodore Roosevelt. At 18, Ruef graduated with the highest honors, then proceeded to enroll at the Hastings College of Law in San Francisco. He graduated from Hastings less than three years later and was accepted to the California State Bar when he was 21, the minimum age of admittance.

California was a center of corruption at the time, influenced by the Southern Pacific Railroad, which controlled both political parties in the state. They and other well-funded interest groups and individuals used their economic power and influence to form trusts and monopolies that guaranteed them power. Many of these wealthy and powerful people lived in San Francisco and, when necessary, could reinforce their hold on power through corrupt politicians and city bosses.

== Political career ==
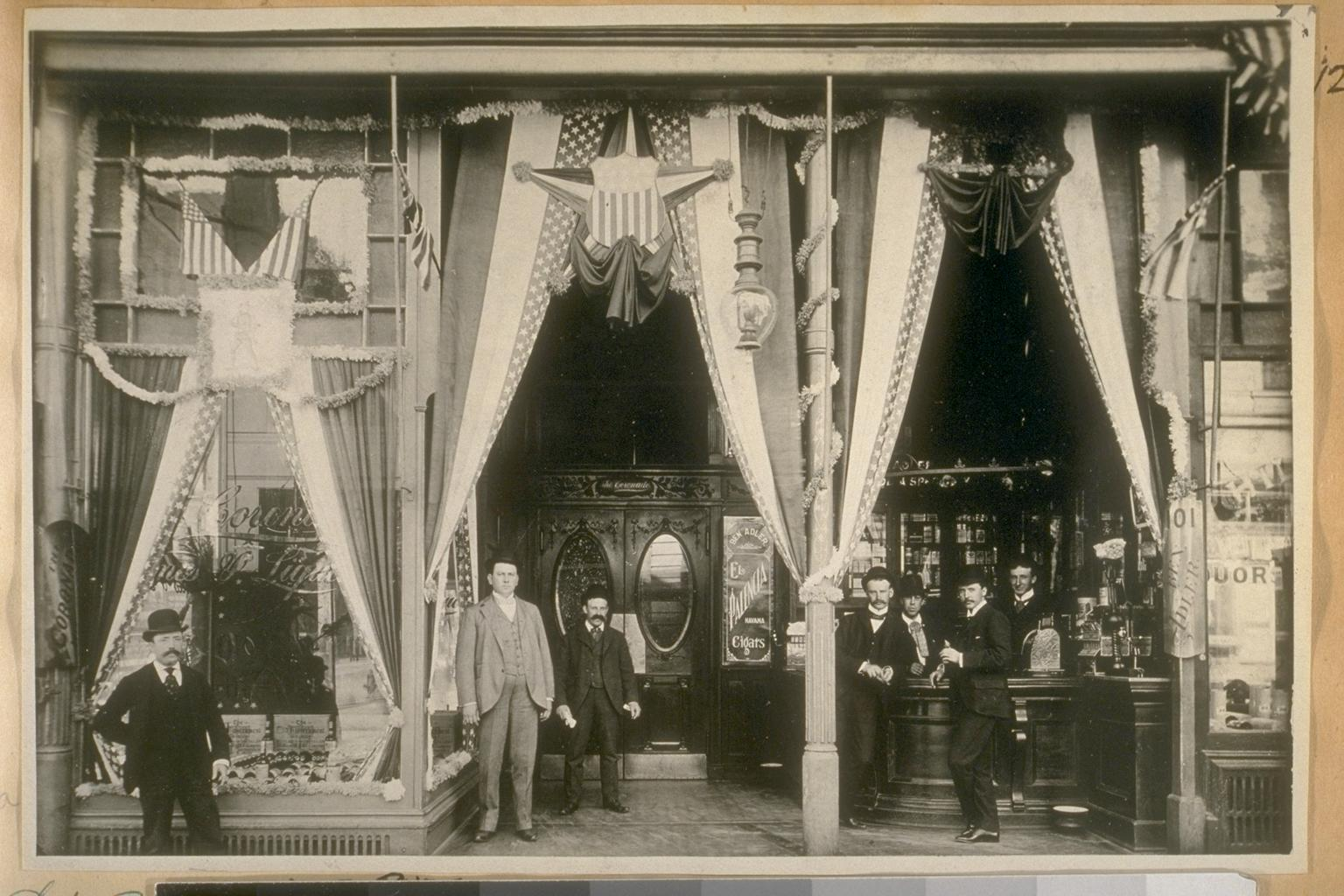
Ruef (far left) and others in front of Ben Adlers' Cigar Store, San Francisco, 1899

Ruef entered politics as a Republican, working for party bosses in the 1890s. He sought to depose them in 1901, and after failing to do so he became the driving force behind the foundation of the new Union Labor Party. Using his position there, he maneuvered himself into a position of power.

=== Chooses San Francisco mayor ===
Ruef selected the relative unknown president of the Musicians Union, Eugene Schmitz, a violinist and amateur composer, to run for mayor on the Union Labor Party ticket. Ruef hoped that Schmitz might be both electable and conducive to influence that might lead the way to the governorship later on. Behind the scenes, Ruef wrote Schmitz' speeches, planned his public appearances, and effectively ran his campaign. Schmitz became "Ruef's puppet" and was elected mayor on November 5, 1901, and was reelected in 1903 and 1905, each time by solid majorities.

=== Controls city politics ===
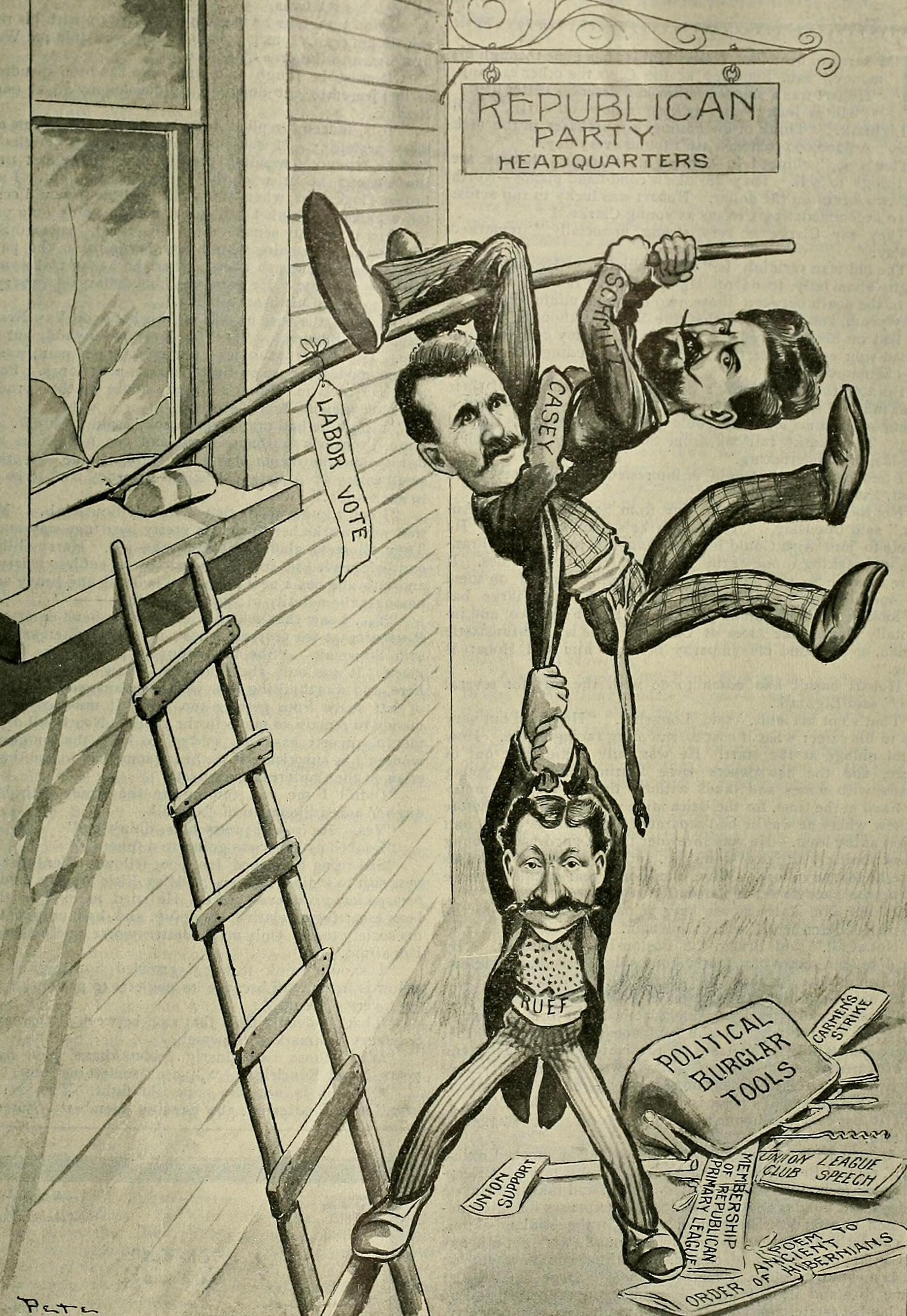
"Trying To Break In," a political cartoon published in The Wasp depicting Ruef, Eugene Schmitz, and Michael Casey attempting to use the labor vote to infiltrate the Republican Party, May 10, 1902

The 1905 election was the first time voting machines were used, which permitted the voter to cast the entire Union Labor ticket. Ruef's political machine gradually gained control of the Chief of Police, the Board of Supervisors, and several judges. But shortly after the 1905 election, his choice for District Attorney, William H. Langdon, began enforcing vice laws, largely ignored until then. Ever since the gold rush of 1849, San Francisco had a reputation as an open town, and the Barbary Coast's notorious dance halls, brothels, and barely concealed gambling dens attracted money and people.

Reformers gained considerable sympathy and support from the general population, who were growing tired of illicit and immoral activity. Radical puritans like Anthony Comstock and prohibitionists were also slowly gaining influence. There came to be a division between people who supported reform in practice and a clique which campaigned with Ruef in the name of Reform.

As political reformers, among whom Ruef had once belonged, had gradually become more powerful over the previous decade, Langdon threw the power of his office behind attacks on the brothels and gambling halls supported by the "Reformers". The San Francisco Evening Bulletin edited by Fremont Older backed Langdon's actions, and the publisher persuaded millionaire Rudolph Spreckels to fund a Federal investigation into corruption at City Hall.

=== Earthquake and aftermath ===
The widespread devastation that followed the 1906 San Francisco earthquake briefly slowed the investigation. Ruef himself lost "nearly $750,000 (about $27,000,000 today) of his real estate holdings". Mayor Schmitz formed the extra-legal Committee of Fifty to expedite repairs, and Ruef was not invited, but he showed up anyway at Franklin Hall where the committee met.

On May 22, 1906, the day after an overhead trolley ordinance was passed by city supervisors, the United Railroads President Patrick Calhoun wired $200,000 to Calhoun's credit at the United States Mint in San Francisco. Two days later, Tirey L. Ford representing Patrick Calhoun and United Railroads brought to the mint a written order from Calhoun to pay Ford $50,000 of the $200,000. On July 31, 1906, Ford withdrew another $50,000, and the remainder of $100,000 on August 23. He passed the money on to Ruef who used this money to pay Supervisor James L. Gallagher in two installments, one of $45,000 in late July and another of $40,000 in late August. He also paid Mayor Schmitz a total of $50,000.

Since "there wasn't a desk in the hall for Ruef, he accepted an offer to share a corner of the Mayor's desk." A contemporary editorial in the Los Angeles Herald called him "the real menace to the successful rehabilitation of San Francisco" for his leadership of the committee. He became chairman of the Subcommittee on Relocating the Chinese and told the other members that "the Chinese must not be allowed to return to the desirable area that Chinatown occupied." The subcommittee debated the question without arriving at a consensus as to where to relocate them. Meanwhile, the Chinese residents returned to Chinatown.

== Indictment and conviction ==
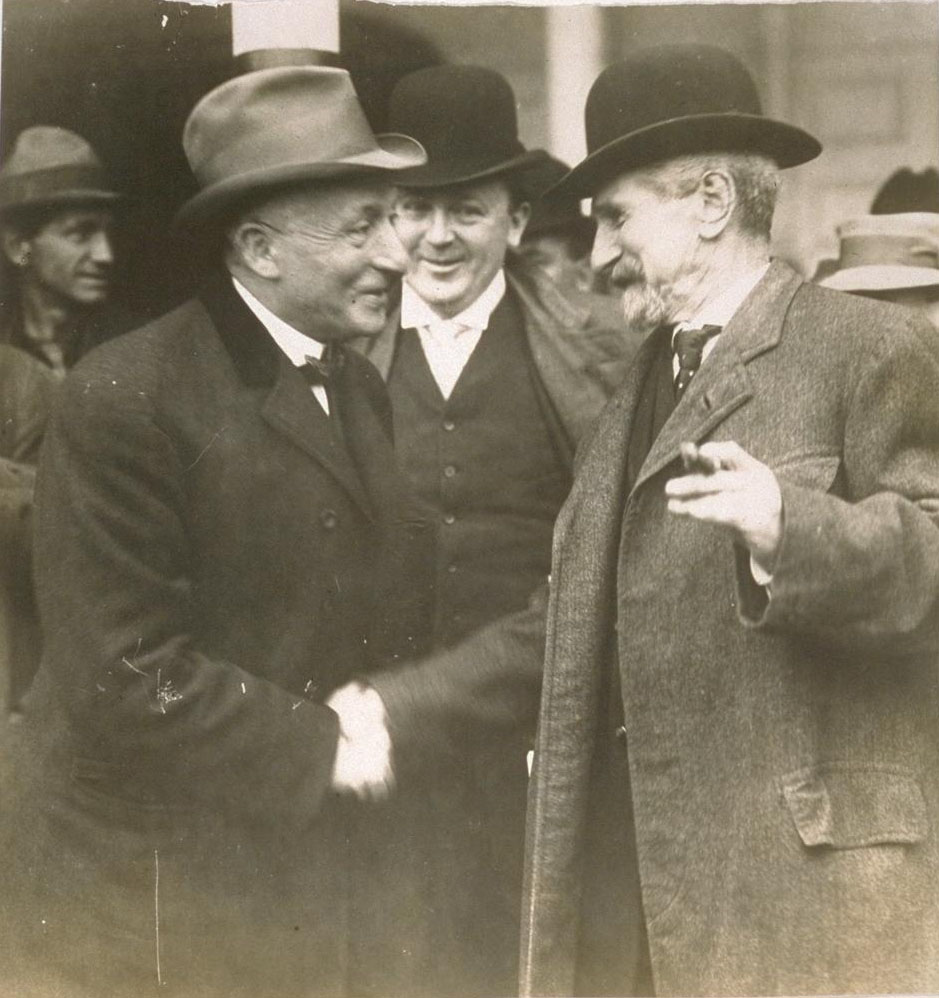
Ruef (left) on his way to San Quentin State Prison after he was convicted in the San Francisco graft trials of 1907–1908.

On October 25, 1906, Ruef ordered Gallagher, then serving as acting mayor while Schmitz was in Europe, to suspend District Attorney Langdon and name himself in Langdon's place. As his first order, Ruef dismissed Langdon's deputy, Francis J. Heney. The next day, Heney and his associates convinced a judge to sign an injunction temporarily preventing Ruef from taking over the district attorney's office, and on November 16 the judge ruled that Langdon was the legitimate district attorney.

On December 6, 1906, Ruef and Schmitz were arraigned in court. "As the indictments were read out by the clerk, Ruef made clear his disdain for the proceedings by standing with his back to the judge." At the time of his trial, Ruef occupied offices in The Columbus Tower, in North Beach. In February 1907, Ruef pleaded not guilty. On March 18, 1907, all of the supervisors confessed before a grand jury to "receiving money from Ruef in connection with the Home Telephone, overhead trolley, prize fight monopoly, and gas rates deals." In exchange, "they were promised complete immunity and would not be forced to resign their offices. The grand jury then returned 65 indictments against Ruef for bribery of the supervisors."

After the supervisors' admissions, Ruef reached an agreement with the prosecution that he'd confess and receive immunity from most of the charges. On May 15, 1907, Ruef pleaded guilty and the next day testified before a grand jury, incriminating Schmitz. This led to Schmitz' conviction and removal from the mayor's office on June 13, 1907. Ruef's trial ended on December 10, 1908, with a verdict of guilty and the maximum sentence for bribery: 14 years in San Quentin. He spent a year at the county jail awaiting his appeal. In December 1909, he was released on bond of $600,000.

=== Release from prison ===
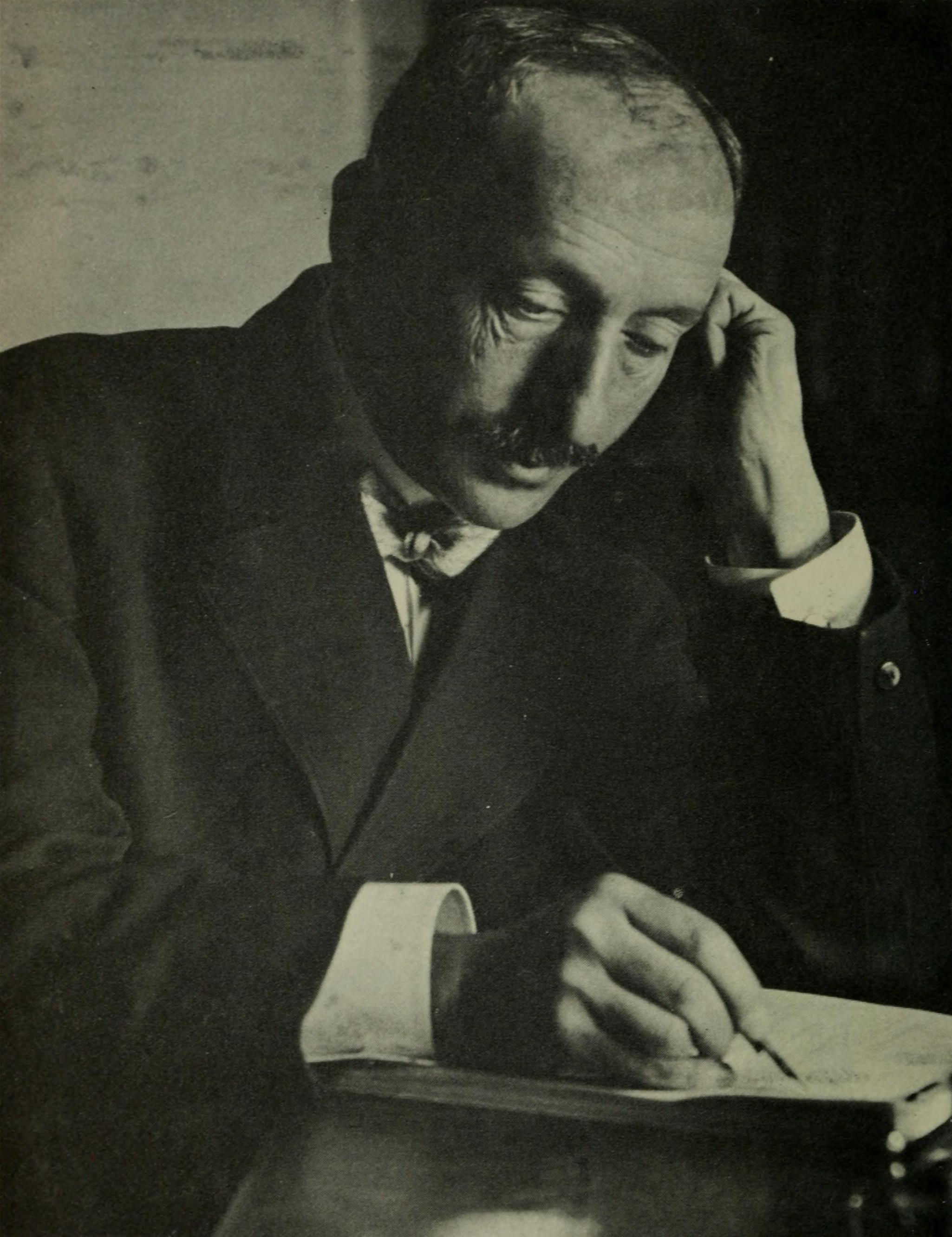
Ruef penning his memoirs in 1912

In November 1910, Ruef's conviction and sentence were upheld. On March 1, 1911, he entered San Quentin Penitentiary. But the businessmen and other politicians who benefited from the graft and corruption escaped punishment. Ruef was the only one jailed. Newspaper editor Older, formerly Ruef's most virulent opponent, became convinced that antisemitism may have played a role in who was punished and who was not. Older corresponded with Ruef in prison and began to campaign through his newspaper for Ruef's release. Older felt that more of the people who took part in the corruption ought to be brought to justice. He paid Ruef over the next year to write a serialized account of his political career in the San Francisco Evening Bulletin, revealing the vast corruption underpinning the city.

In 1912, Ruef was called as a witness at the new trial of ex-Mayor Schmitz, but Ruef refused to testify. Later in 1912, Ruef wrote his memoirs, which were published in the San Francisco Evening Bulletin in almost daily installments over several months, finishing at the point where the graft investigation began. On August 23, 1915, having served just over four and a half of his fourteen-year sentence, Ruef was released. He was not allowed to resume his legal practice. He had been worth over a million dollars before he went to prison but died bankrupt. He died in San Francisco on February 29, 1936.

== Caricature gallery ==
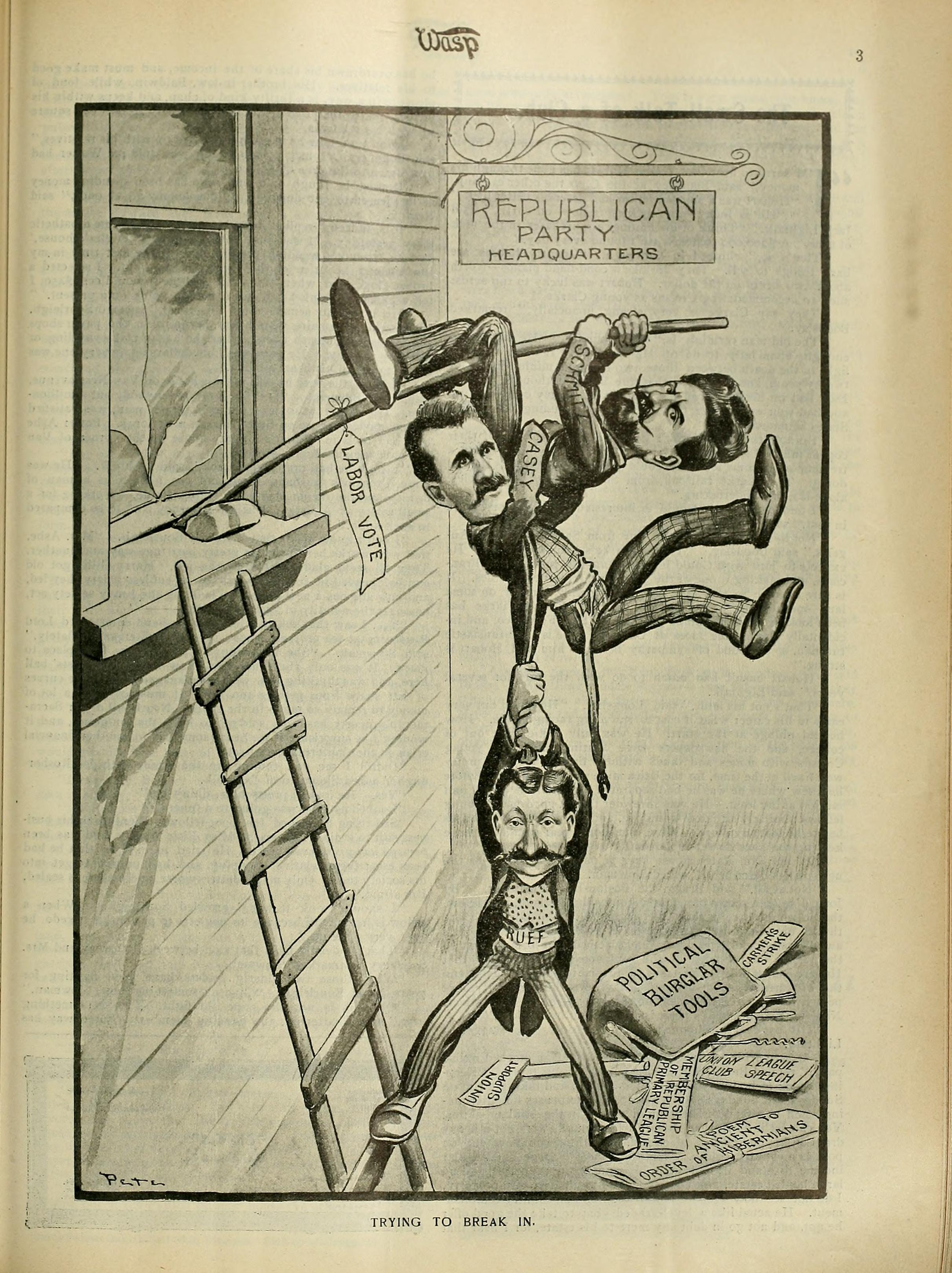
"Trying to Break in"

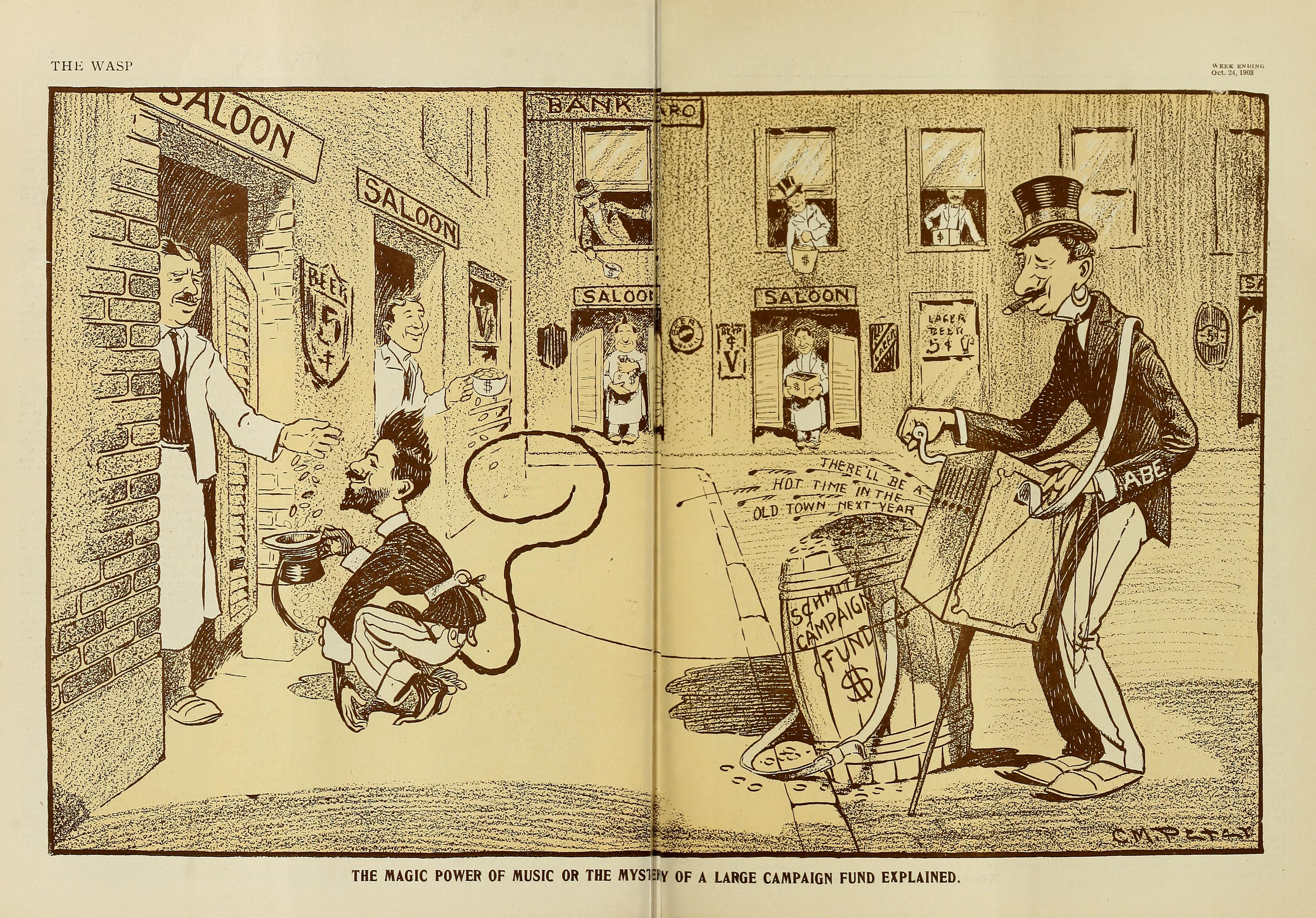
"The Magic Power of Music or the Mystery of a Large Campaign Fund Explained"

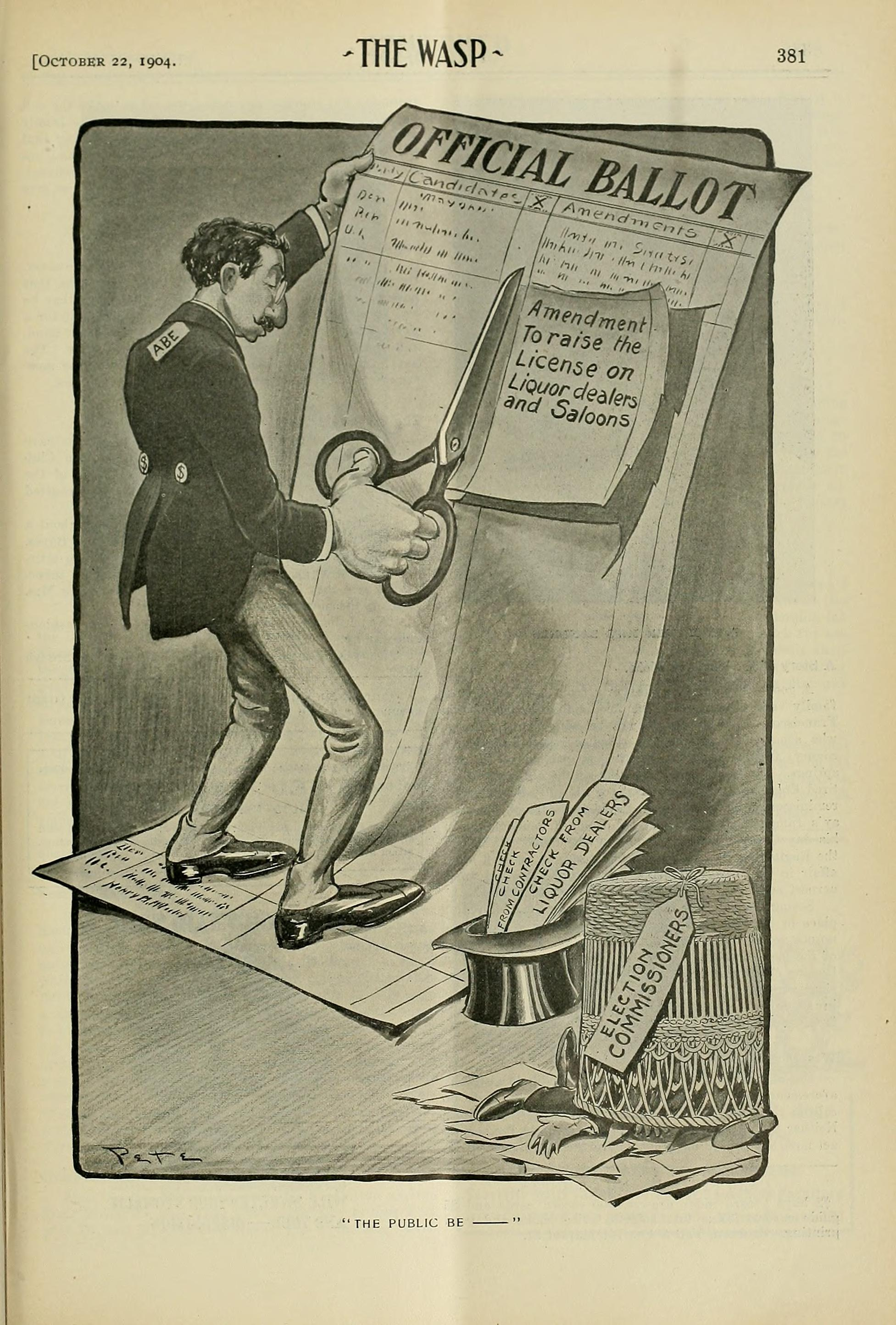
"The Public Be—"

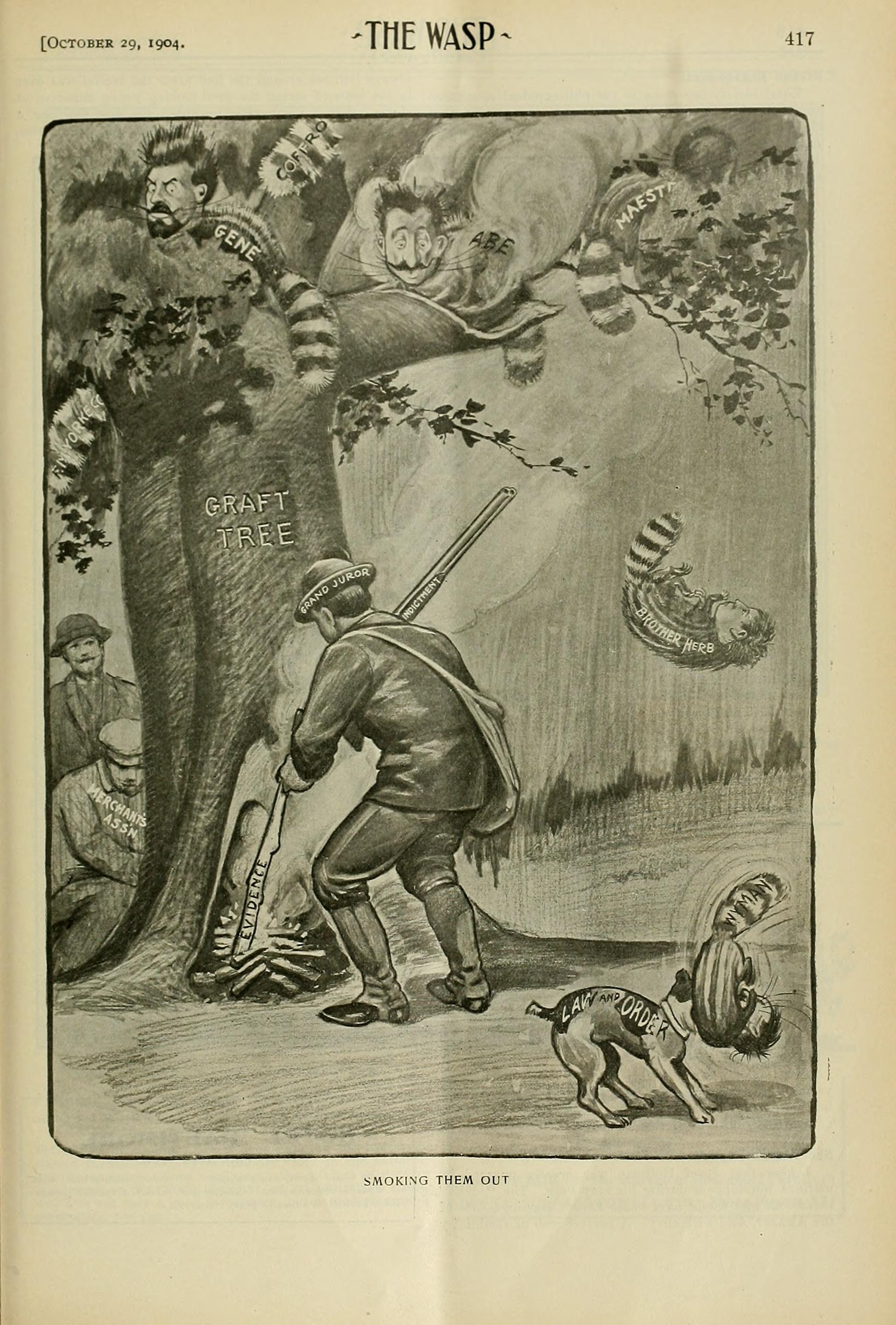
"Smoking Them Out"

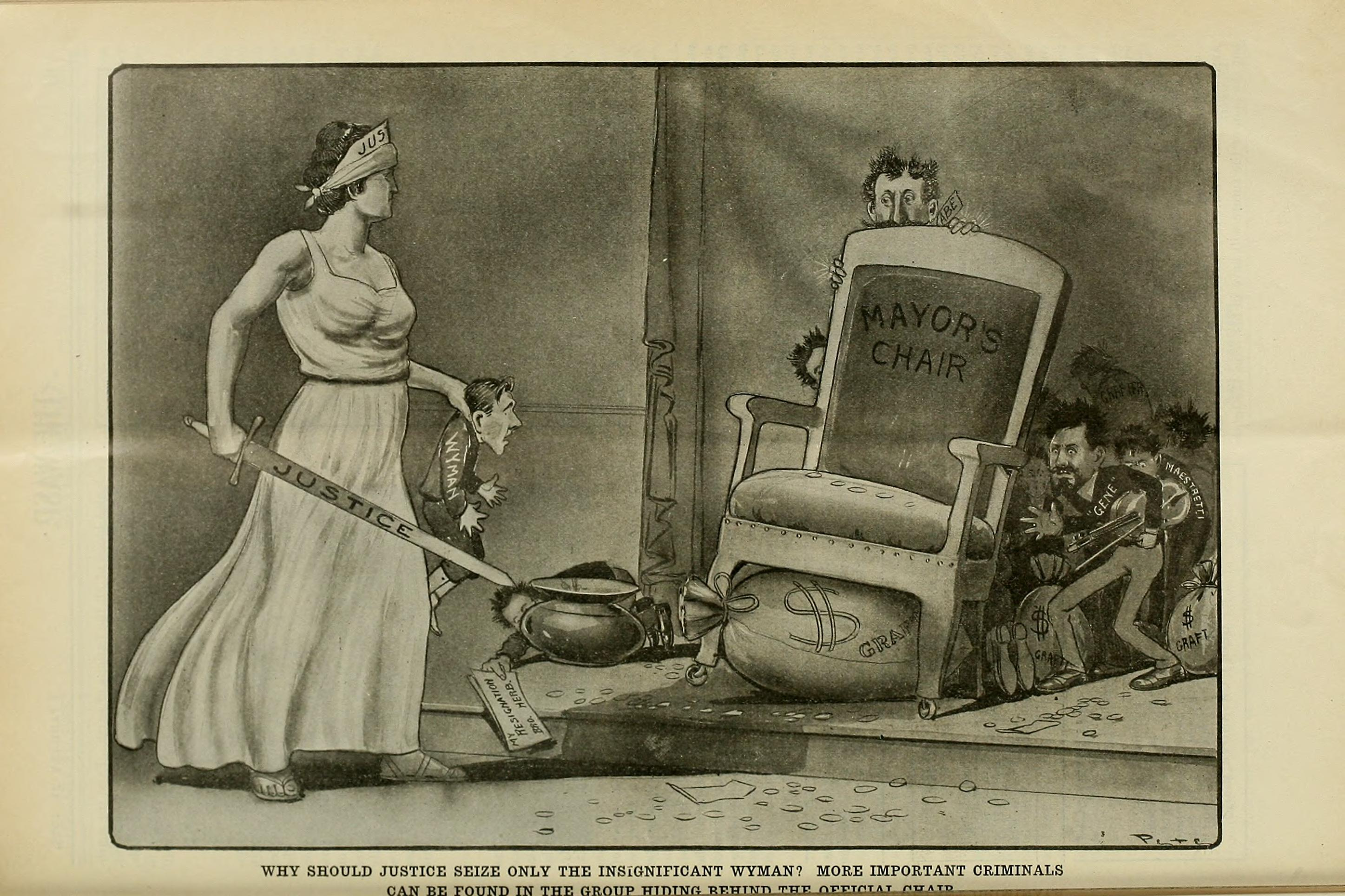
"Why Should Justice Seize Only the Insignificant Wyman?"

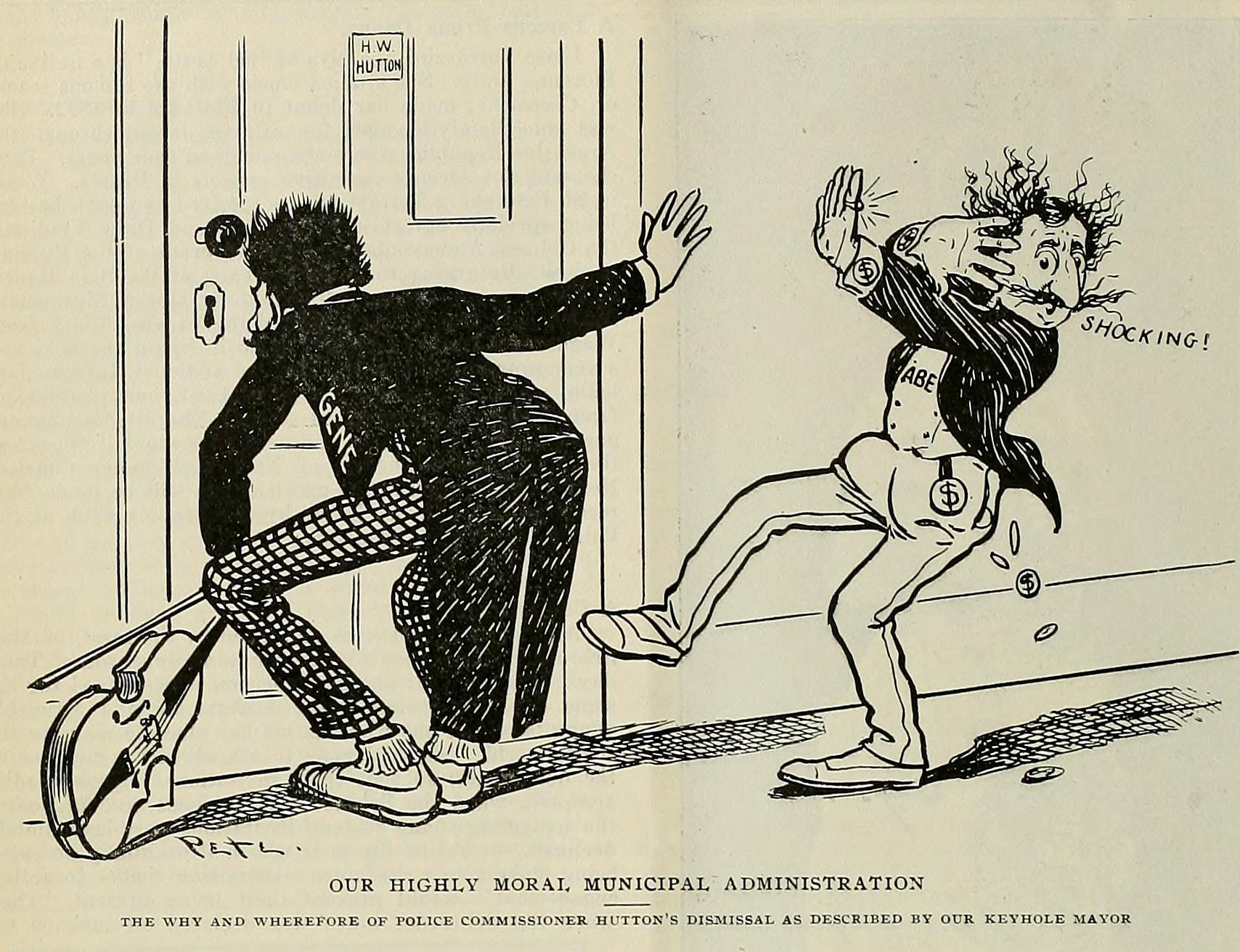
"Our Highly Moral Municipal Administration"

"A Warning"

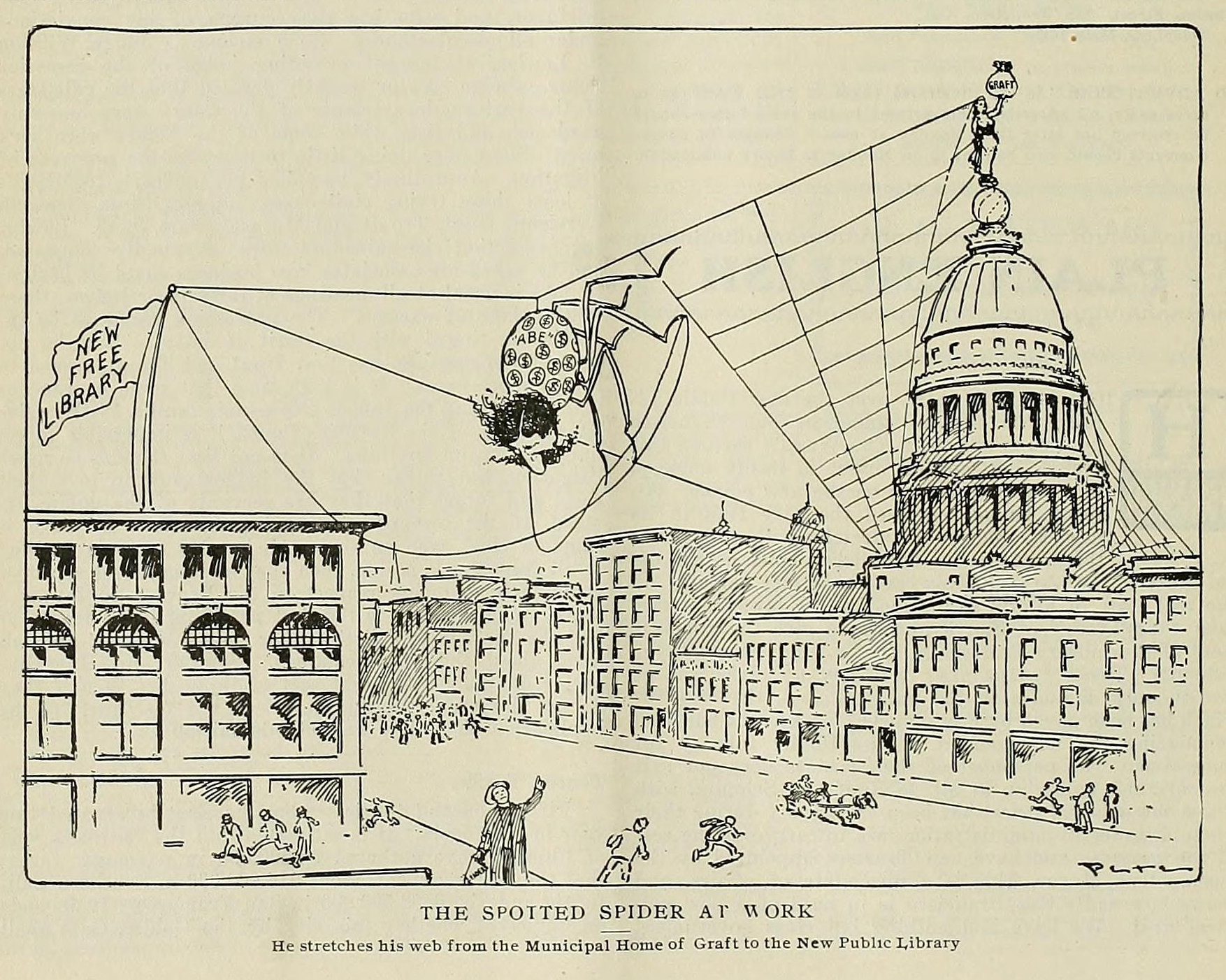
"The Spotted Spider at Work"

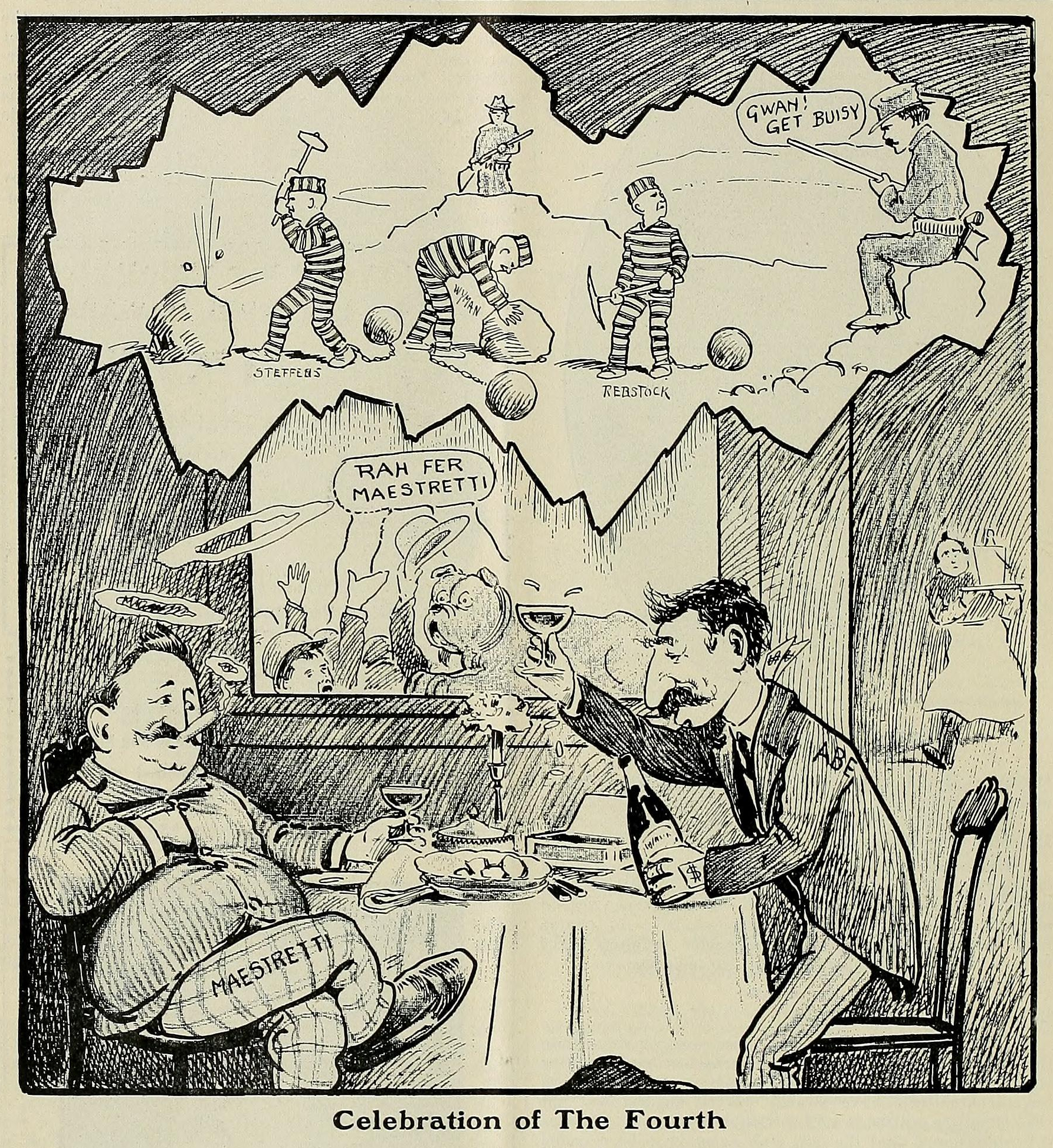
"Celebration of The Fourth"

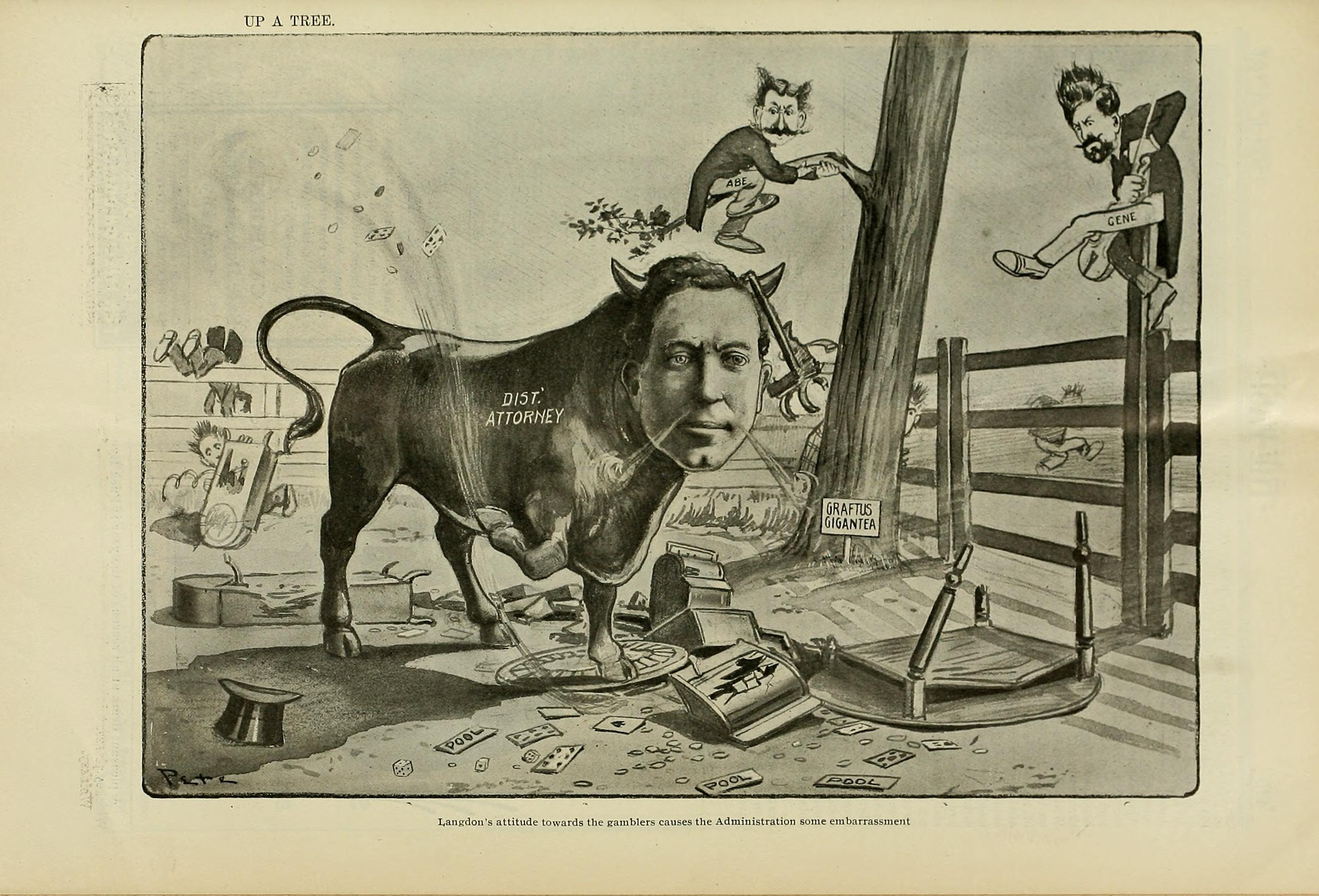
"Up A Tree"

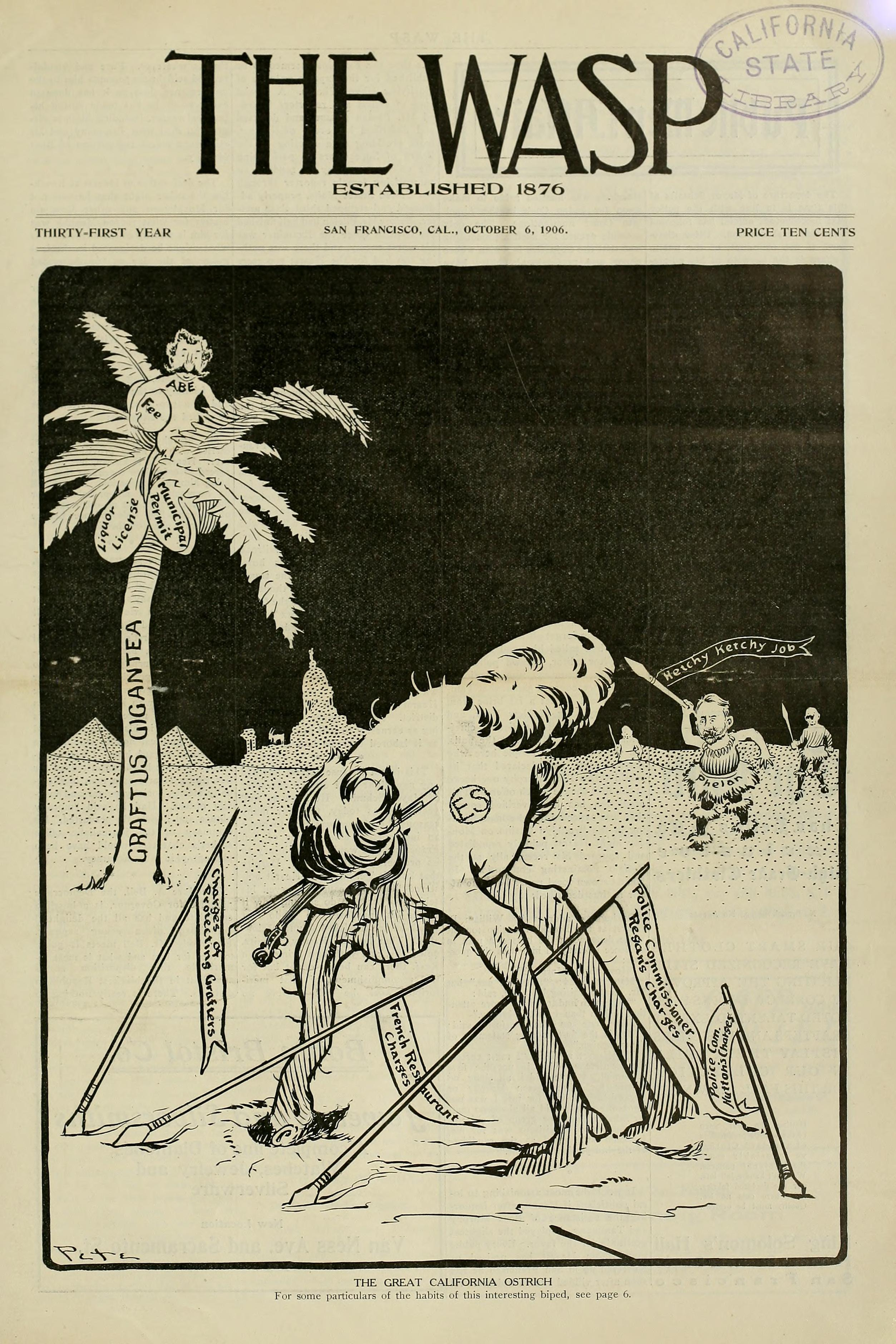
"The Great California Ostrich"

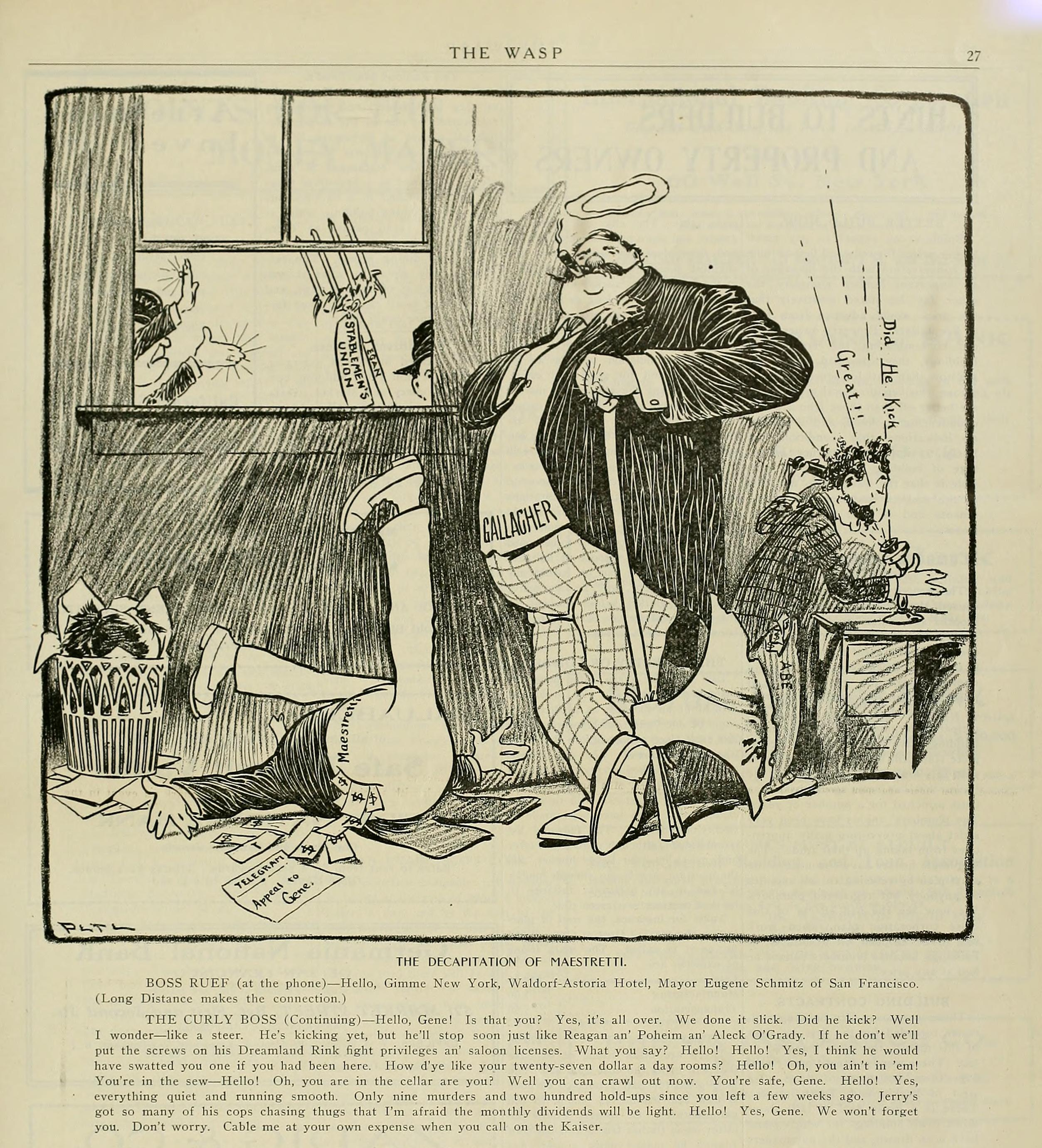
"The Decapitation of Maestretti"

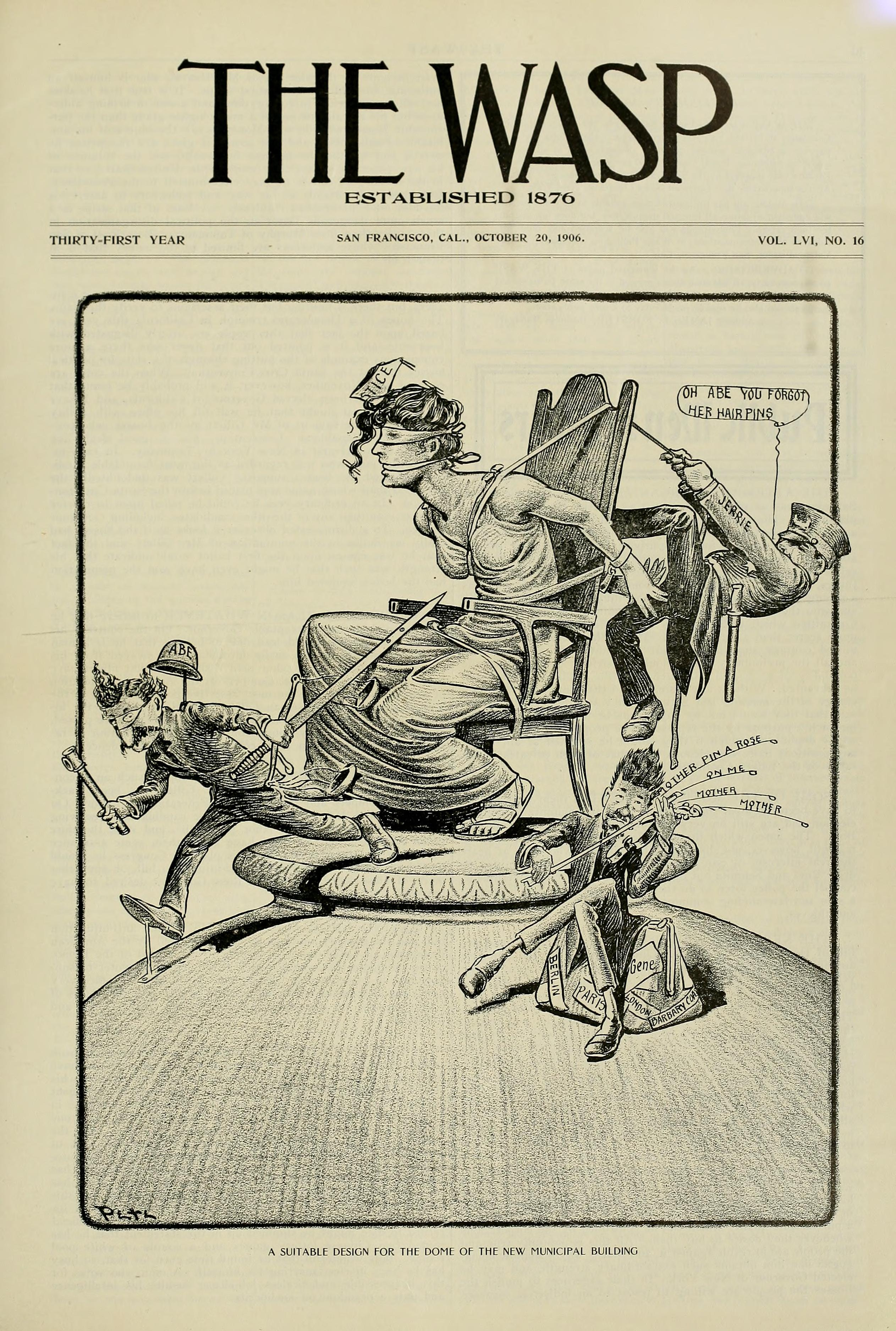
"A Suitable Design for the Dome of the New Municipal Building"

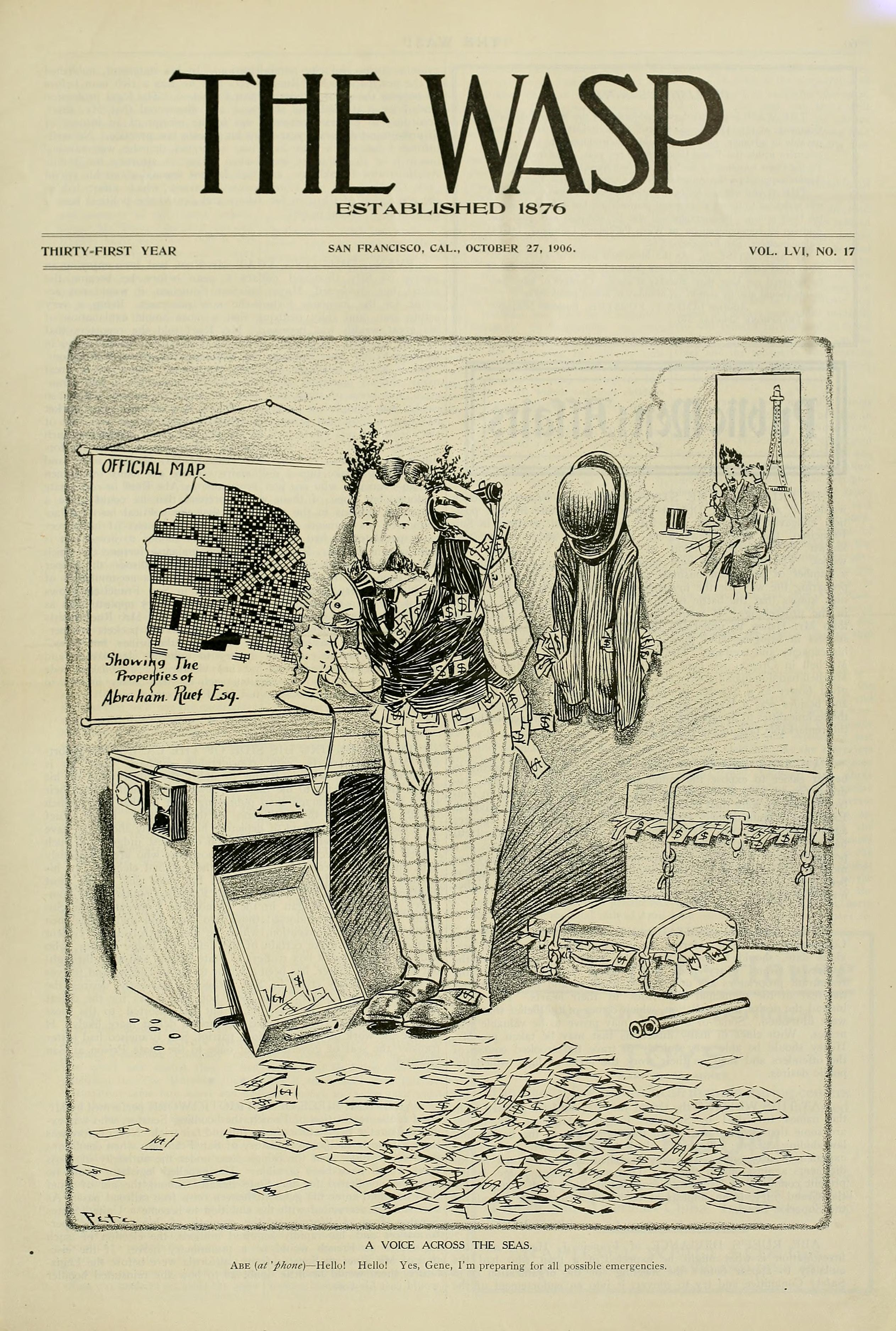
"A Voice Across the Seas"

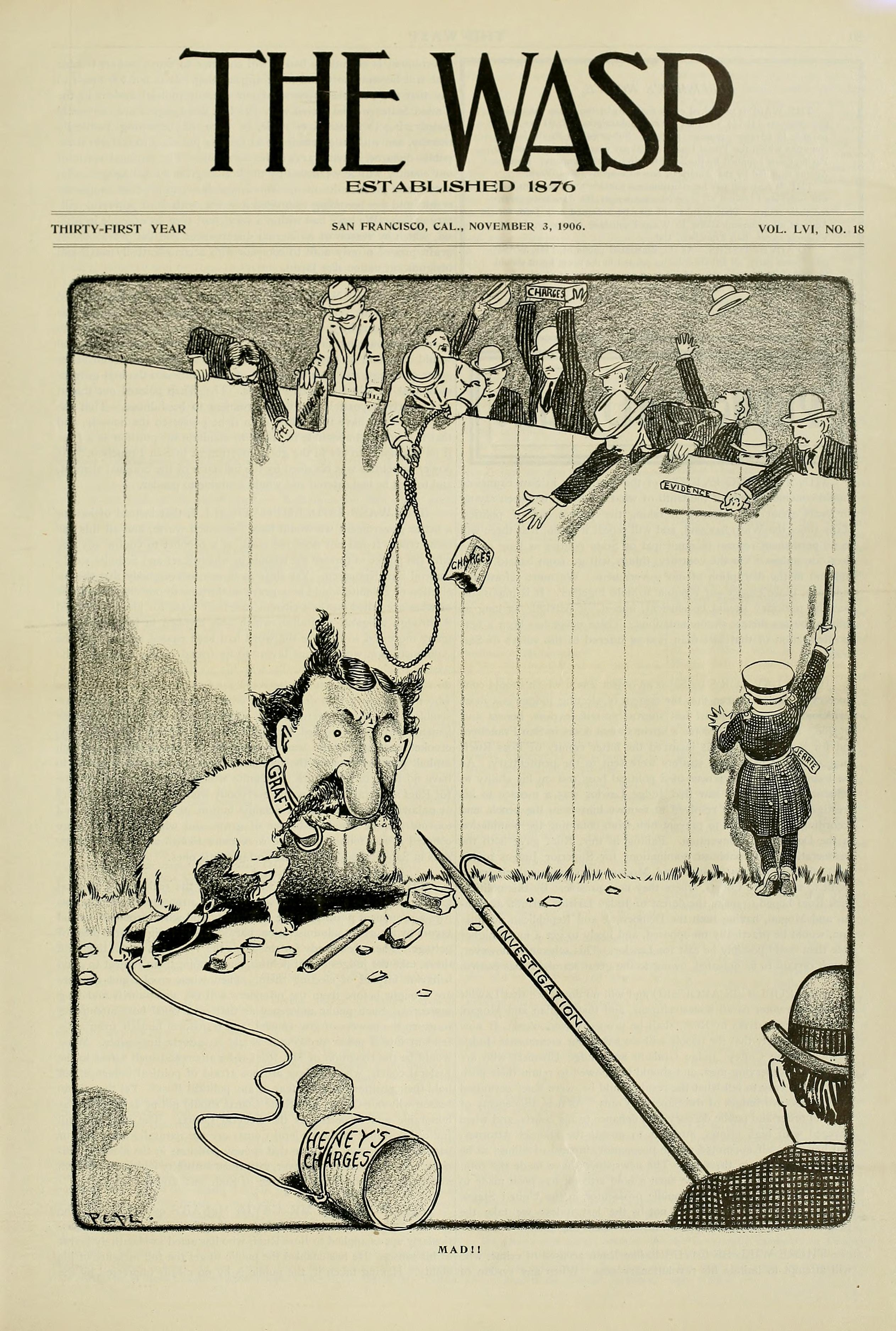
"Mad!!"

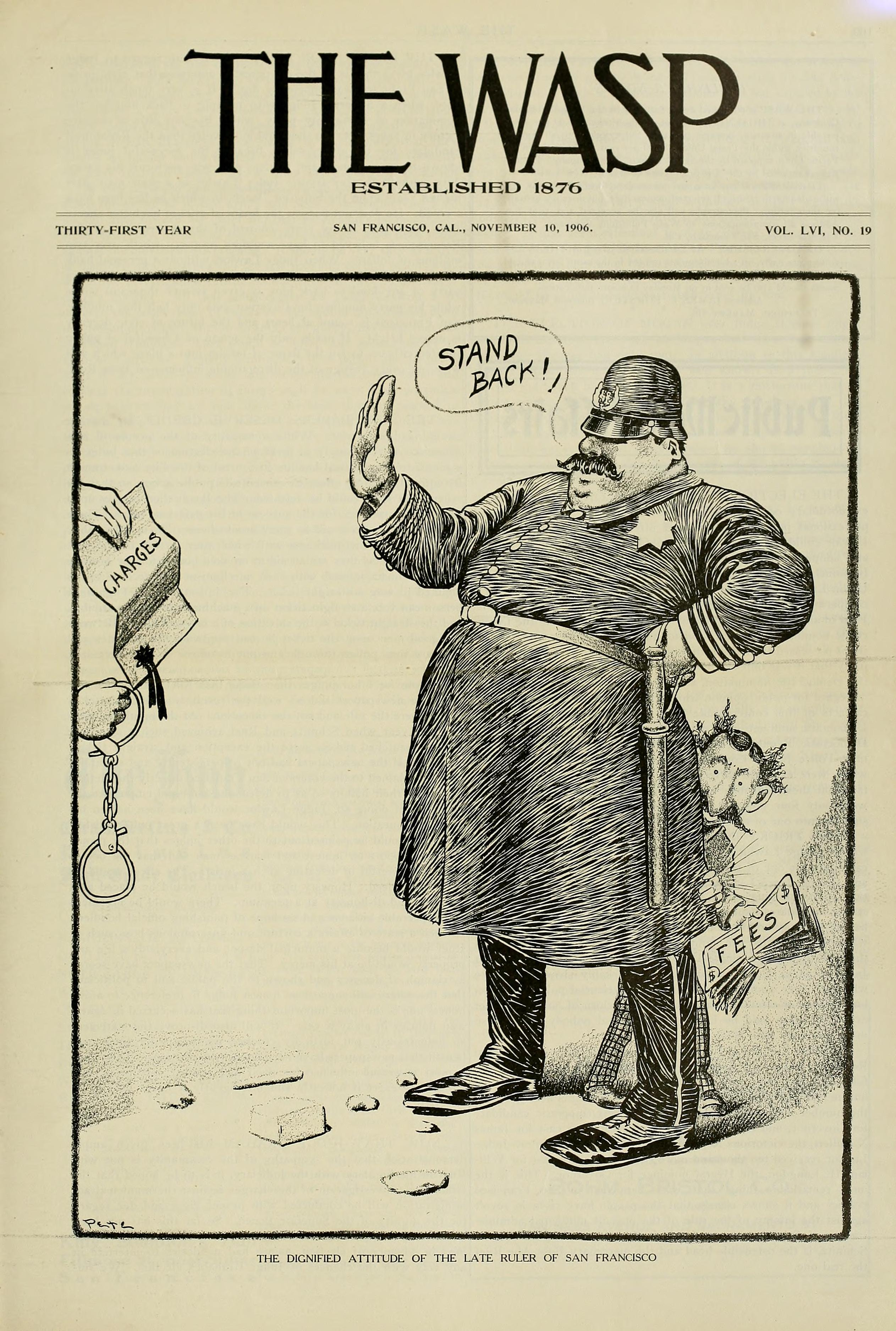
"The Dignified Attitude of the Late Ruler of San Francisco"

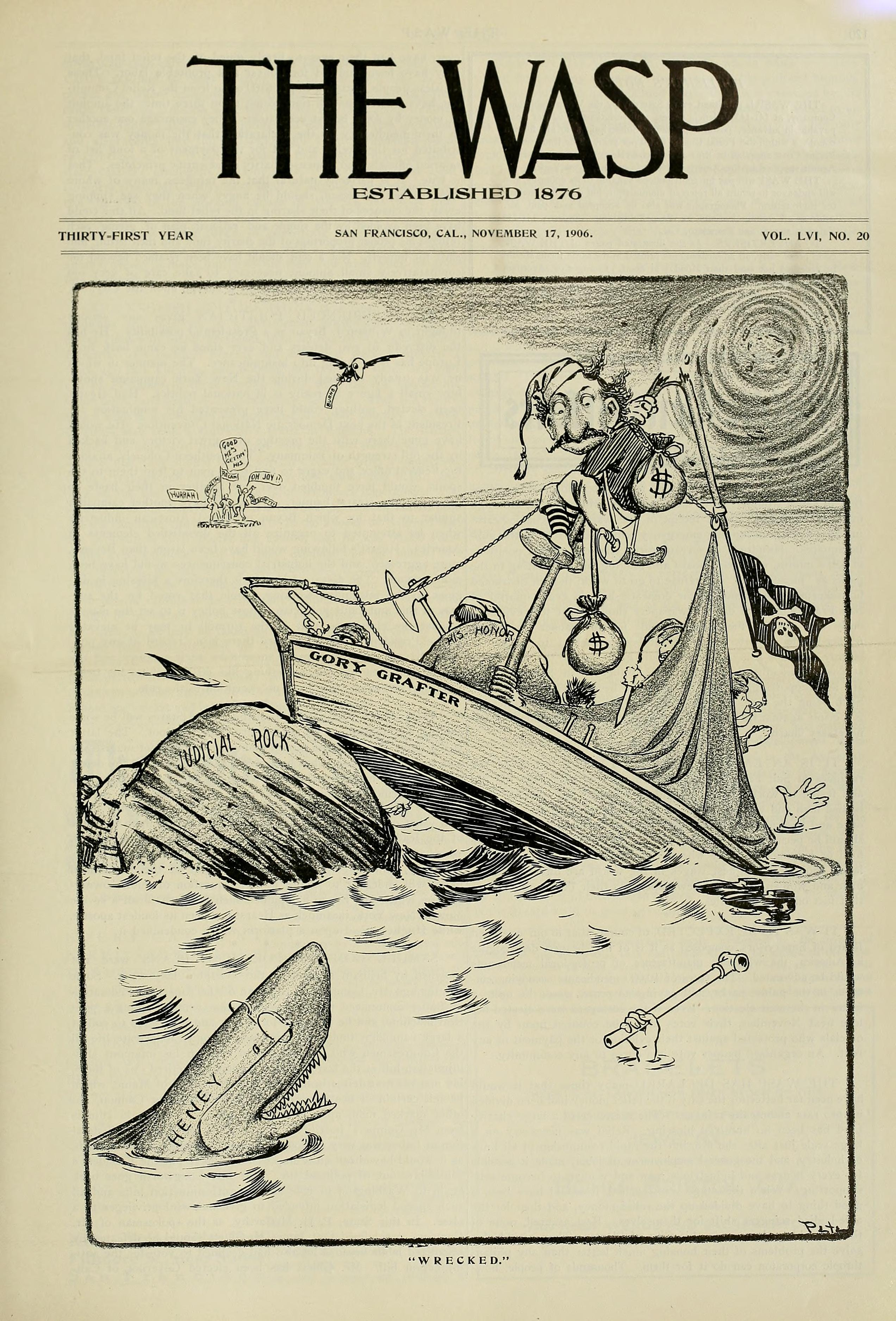
"Wrecked"

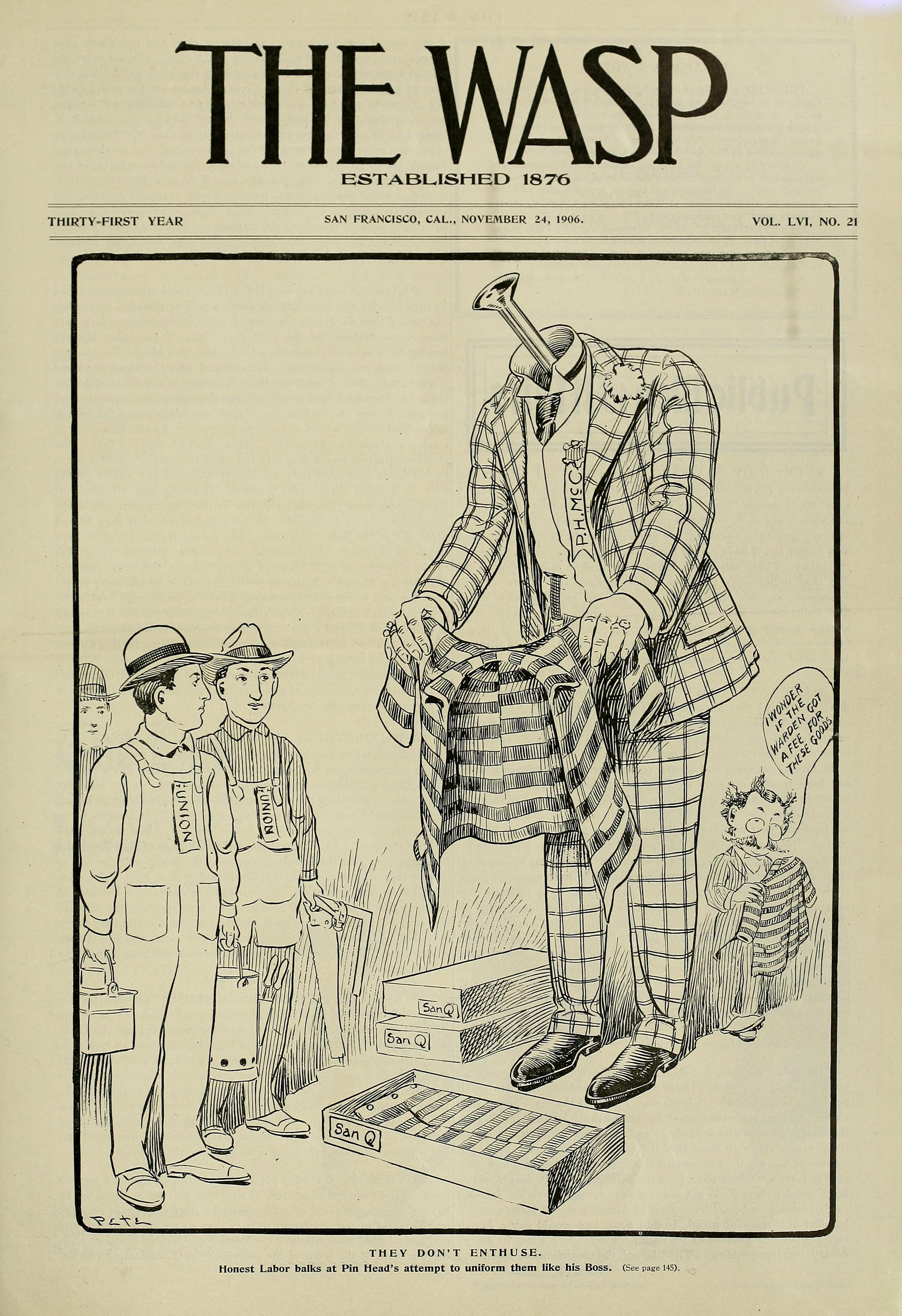
"They Don't Enthuse"

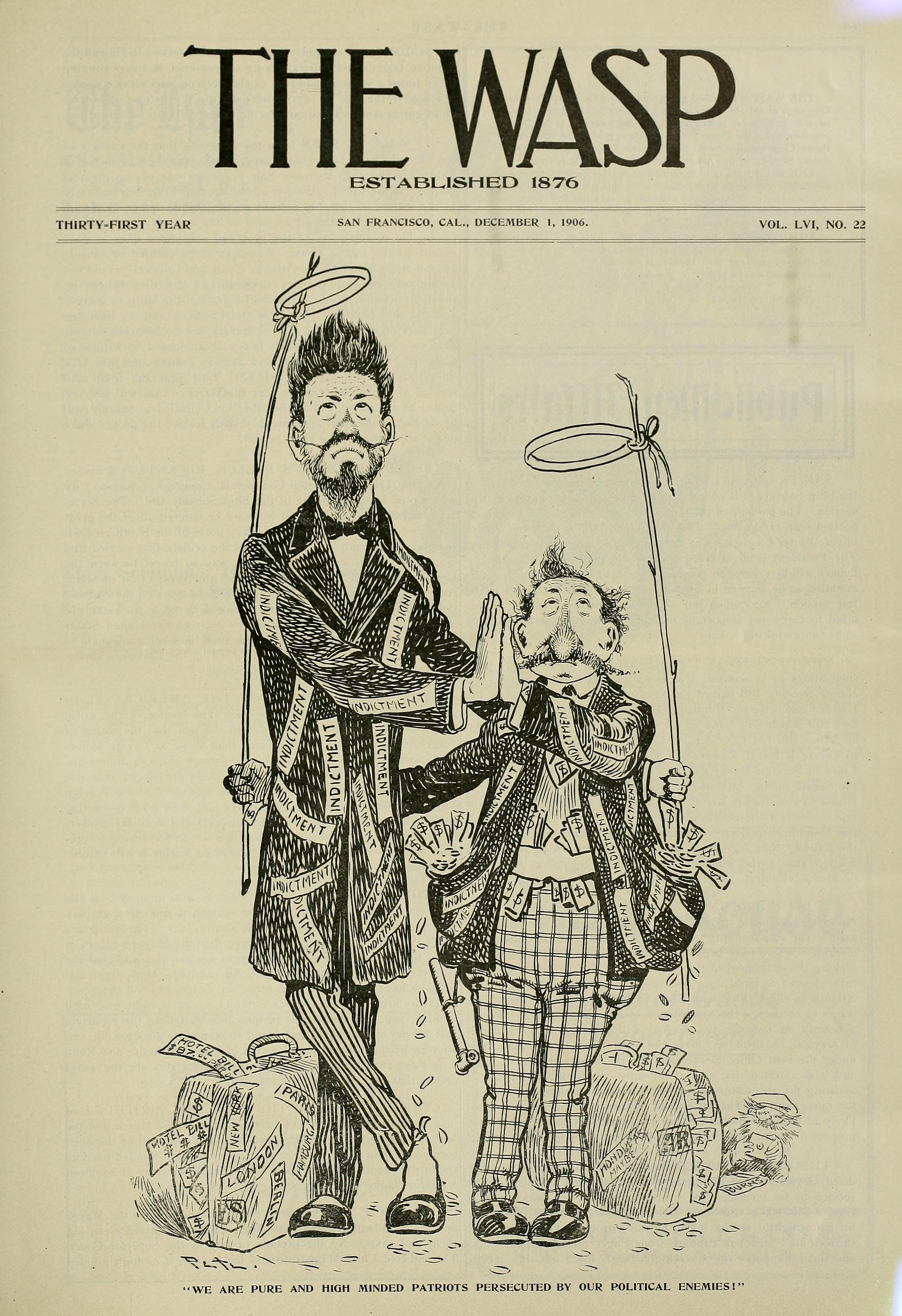
"'We Are Pure and High Minded Patriots Persecuted by Our Political Enemies!'"

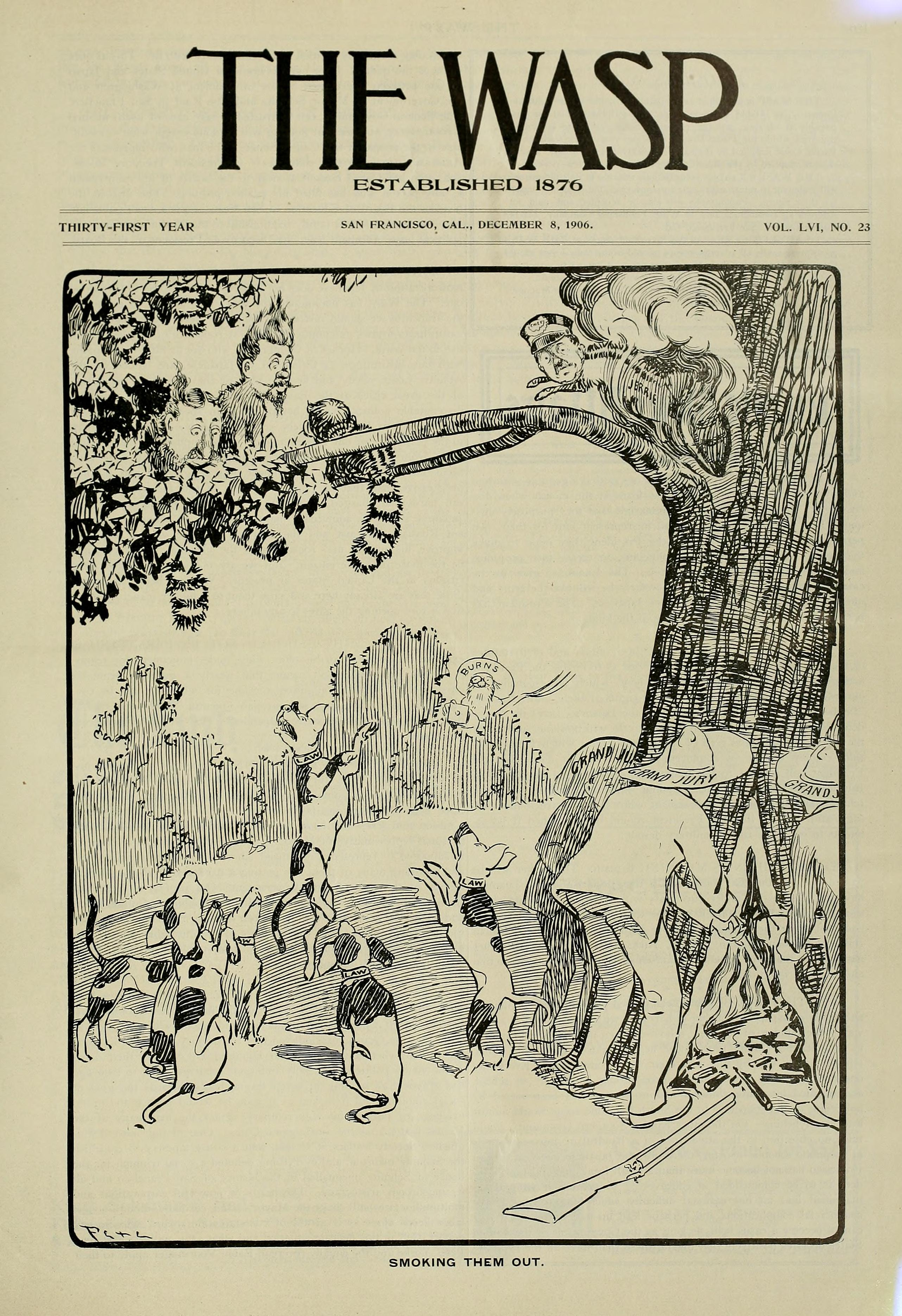
"Smoking Them Out"

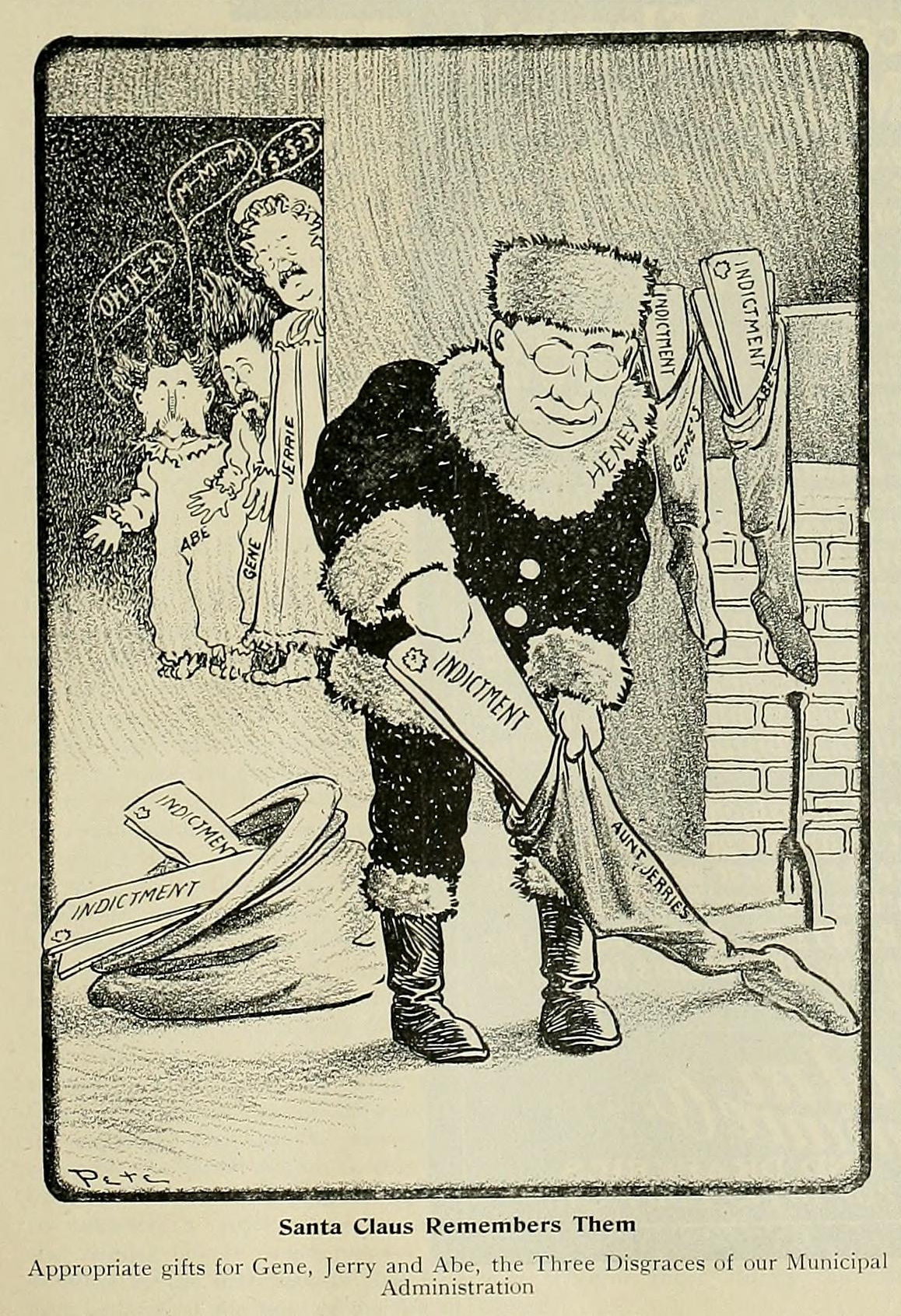
"Santa Claus Remembers Them"

"The Sick Siamese Twins"

"Another Earthquake in San Francisco"

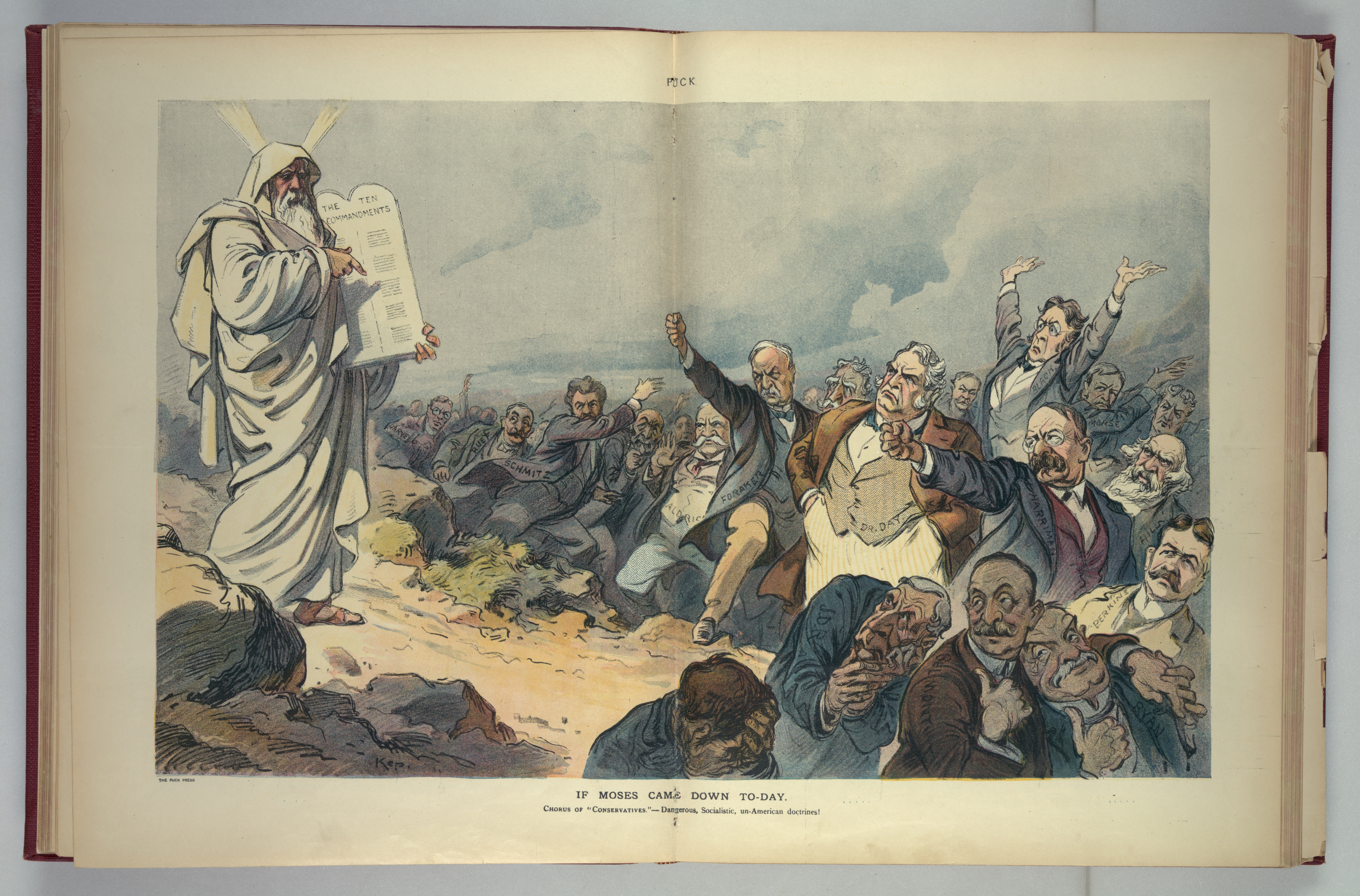
"If Moses Came Down To-day"

"What Are You Going to Do About It?"

== Bibliography ==
- Thomas Lately. Debonair Scoundrel: The Flamboyant Story of Abe Ruef and San Francisco's Infamous Era of Graft (NY, 1962)
- Bean, Walton (1952). Boss Ruef's San Francisco: The Story of the Union Labor Party, Big Business, and the Graft Prosecution. Berkeley: University of California Press.
- James P. Walsh. "Abe Ruef Was No Boss: Machine Politics, Reform, and San Francisco" (California Historical Quarterly, Spring 1972)
