= John C. Calhoun II =

American planter and businessman

John Caldwell Calhoun II
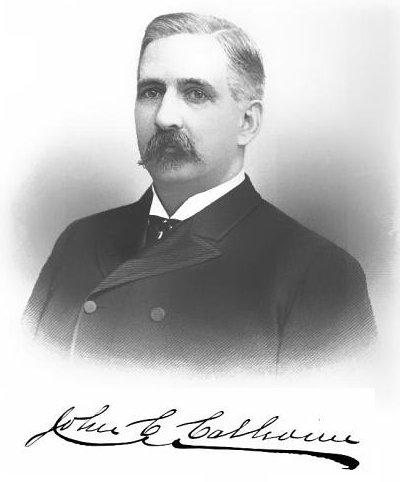
- Calhoun circa 1902
- Born: John Caldwell Calhoun II; July 9, 1843; Demopolis, Alabama
- Died: December 18, 1918 (aged 75); Manhattan, New York City
- Occupations: Planter, businessman
- Spouse: Lennie Adams
- Children: 3 sons, 1 daughter
- Parent(s): Andrew Pickens Calhoun; Margaret Green Calhoun
- Relatives: Patrick Calhoun (brother); John C. Calhoun (paternal grandfather)

John Caldwell Calhoun II (1843–1918) was an American planter and businessman. He was a large landowner in Chicot County, Arkansas, and a director of railroad companies. He was a prominent financier and developer of the "New South".

== Early life ==
He was born on July 9, 1843, in Demopolis, Alabama. His father, Andrew Pickens Calhoun, was a planter. He had a brother, Patrick Calhoun. His paternal grandfather, John C. Calhoun, served as the Vice President of the United States from 1825 to 1832.

He was educated in Demopolis, Alabama and graduated from South Carolina College in 1863.

During the American Civil War of 1861–1865, he served in the Confederate States Army (CSA).

== Career ==
In 1866, Calhoun entered in a partnership with James R. Powell, a businessman from Montgomery, Alabama, whereby he moved freedmen from the Southeast to Yazoo County, Mississippi, where they worked on new plantations. A year later, he decided to do this on his own, and on a larger scale. Over the years, he moved over 5,000 freedmen from North Carolina, South Carolina, Georgia and Alabama to the Yazoo Valley of Mississippi.

By 1869, Calhoun moved to the Florence Plantation in Chicot County, Arkansas, which was inherited by his wife through her mother. By 1881–1882, he acquired a few more plantations in Chicot County: Harwood, Hebron, Luna, Fawnwood, Patria, Hyner's, and Latrobe. He also acquired the Sunnyside Plantation from the Starling family for US$90,000. He also acquired the Lakeport Plantation from his mother-in-law. He established the Calhoun Land Company, the Florence Planting Company, and the Chicot Planting Company. He teamed up with investors J. Baxter Upham of Boston and Austin Corbin of New York City. However, due to heavy debt, by 1885, he let his brother divest of their Arkansas landholdings.

Meanwhile, Calhoun moved to New York City, where he invested in the construction of Southern railways. He served as on the Board of Directors of railroad companies. He became the majority proprietor of the Baltimore Coal Mining and Railway Company. He sued the United States Shipbuilding Company.

== Personal life ==
He married Linnie Adams on December 8, 1870, in Marengo County, Alabama. She was the daughter of Betsy Johnson and grandniece of Richard Johnson, who served as the Vice President of the United States from 1837 to 1841. They had three sons and one daughter.

== Death ==
He died on December 18, 1918, at his home 200 West Fifty-eighth Street, in Manhattan. He was buried at the Saint Philips Episcopal Church Cemetery in Charleston, South Carolina.
