= Patrick Calhoun =

American railroad magnate (1856–1943)

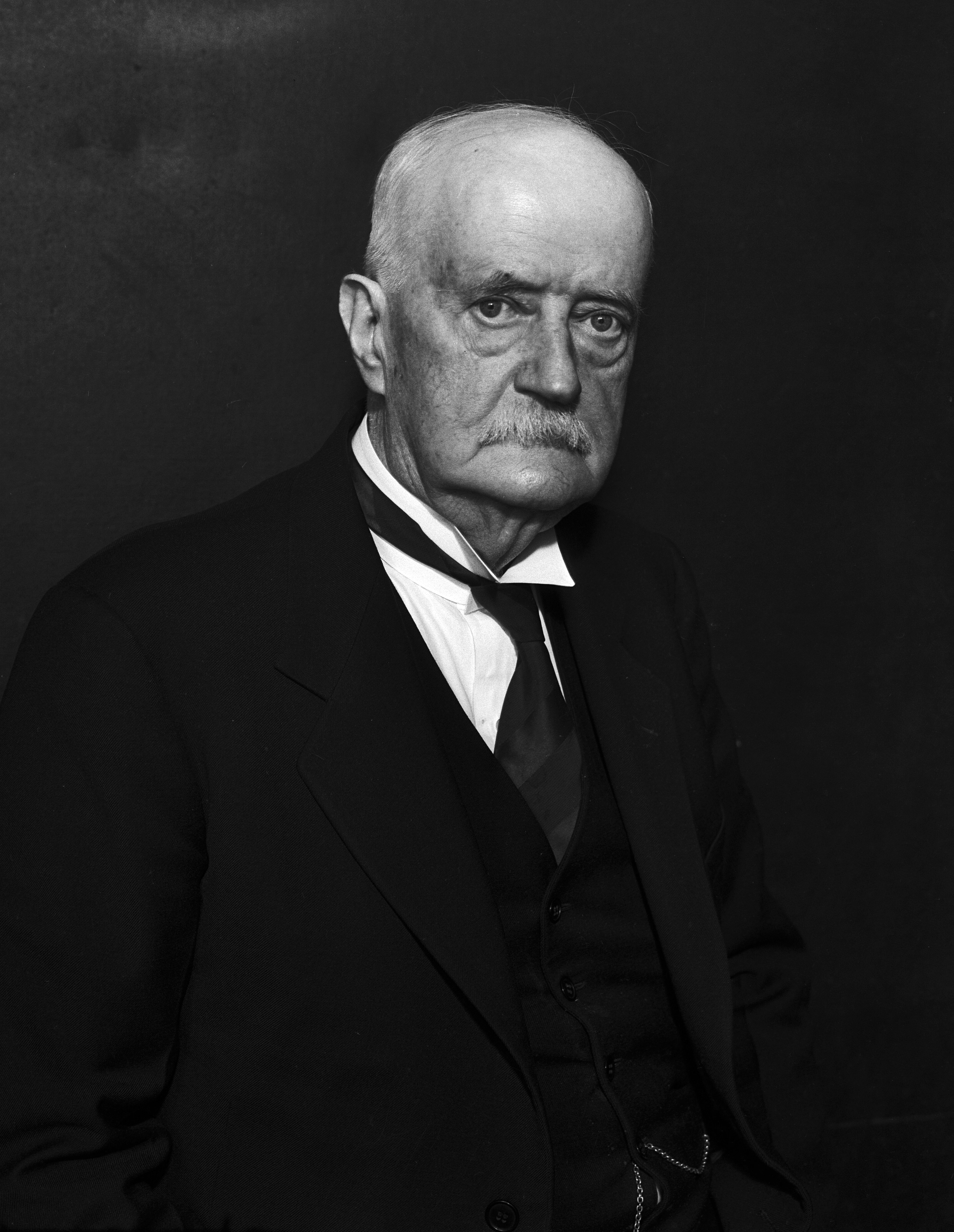
- Calhoun in 1935
- Born: March 21, 1856; Fort Hill, Clemson, South Carolina, U.S.
- Died: June 16, 1943 (aged 87); Pasadena, California, U.S.
- Occupation: Railroad magnate
- Relatives: John C. Calhoun II (brother); John C. Calhoun (paternal grandfather)

Patrick Calhoun (March 21, 1856 – June 16, 1943) was an American railroad businessman. He was the grandson of John C. Calhoun and Floride Calhoun, and the great-grandson of his namesake Patrick Calhoun. He is best known as a railroad baron of the late 19th century, and as the founder of Euclid Heights, Ohio.

== Life and career ==
Patrick Calhoun was born at Fort Hill, the estate of his grandfather, John C. Calhoun, located near Clemson, South Carolina. He was born to Andrew Pickens Calhoun and Margaret Maria (née Green), and was the youngest of six children. His maternal grandfather, Duff Green, was an important South Carolina businessman who had been a financial backer of John C. Calhoun early in Calhoun's political career.

Patrick received his education in local country schools around Clemson. His life changed dramatically in 1865. The defeat of the Confederacy left Andrew P. Calhoun, a wealthy cotton planter, financially ruined. Andrew died suddenly on March 16, 1865. Patrick spent the next five years working on his family farm at Fort Hill and reading extensively in his father's library.

Patrick left home in 1871 and traveled to Dalton, Georgia, and the home of his grandfather, Duff Green. A relative defrayed the cost of his single year of high school education. He studied law thereafter under his grandfather's tutelage, and was admitted to the State Bar Association of Georgia. He moved the following year to St. Louis, Missouri, and was admitted to the Missouri bar. He suffered a severe health breakdown after a year, and went to live on the Arkansas farm of his brother, John C. Calhoun II. An attorney from Atlanta, Georgia, offered him a partnership in 1878 if he would move to Atlanta. This association was very brief, and he founded the law firm of Calhoun, King & Spalding. Focusing on corporate law, the firm became highly profitable. Calhoun used his profits to found the Calhoun Land Company (which invested in cotton production in the Mississippi Valley); buy extensive real estate in Georgia, South Carolina, and Texas; and invest or buy stock in manufacturing, mining, oil, and railroads.

In 1884, Calhoun was appointed legal counsel of the Central Rail Road and Banking Company of Georgia. He formed a syndicate of investors in 1886 and won control of the Richmond and West Point Terminal Railway and Warehouse Company. He was ousted by a similar corporate coup in 1893, but the company went bankrupt two years later and Calhoun acted as an agent for J. P. Morgan in buying the railroad and integrating it into the Southern Railway.

Highly interested in finance after this experience, Calhoun left his law practice in 1896 and became a business financier. His primary backers were the investment banks of Alex. Brown & Sons, Brown Bros. & Co., and the Maryland Trust Company. He invested heavily in street railways, directing or reorganizing systems in Baltimore, Maryland; Philadelphia, Pennsylvania; and St. Louis, Missouri. Calhoun moved to Cleveland, Ohio, in 1896. Calhoun had purchased 300 acres (1,200,000 m^{2}) of wooded land atop the heights east of the city in 1890. He now began development of that land into a new planned community for the wealthy and upper classes, and named it Euclid Heights.

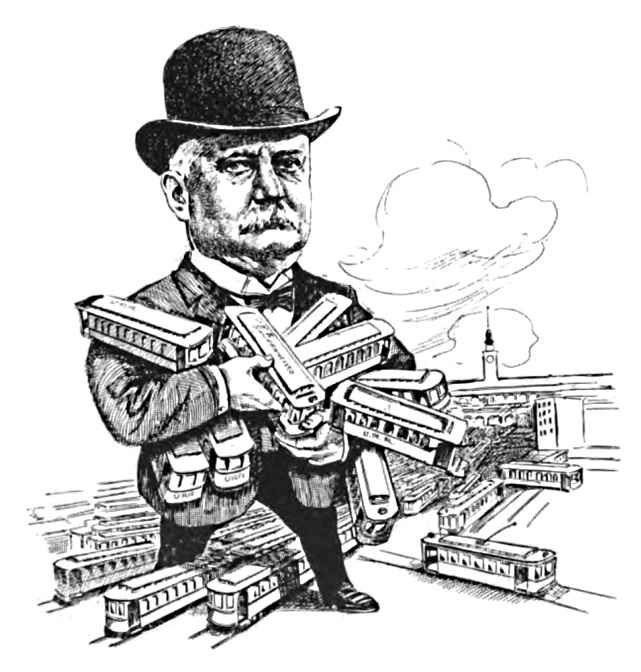
Caricature of Calhoun from 1912, depicting him playing with streetcars as if they were toys

In 1900, Calhoun left Euclid Heights and moved to San Francisco, California. He merged the street railways of that city into a single firm, the United Railroads of San Francisco (URR), and became the company president in 1906. He then gave local political boss Abe Ruef $200,000 ($7,166,667 in 2025 dollars) to allow him to build overhead electric wires to supply his streetcars with power. Calhoun was indicted and placed on trial several times, but eventually charges against him were dismissed when his political supporters won office.

Calhoun's personal financial situation deteriorated significantly and swiftly after 1906. He claimed he lost $2.5 million ($89,583,333 in 2025 dollars) in the 1906 San Francisco earthquake, and that he'd been ruined by adverse publicity. He also spent heavily on strikebreakers in a 1907 streetcar strike, and incurred significant legal expenses fighting the streetcar workers' union. In 1912, an investigation by the California Railway Commission found that Calhoun had concealed a $1.2 million ($43,000,000 in 2025 dollars) loss in his San Francisco company in order to keep the stock price high. His investors forced him to resign the presidency of the United Railways of San Francisco in the summer of 1913.

Now 59 years old, Calhoun largely retired from business. He invested in real estate, but all his efforts failed. He moved to New York City in 1914, where he lived off his wife's income and attempted to re-establish himself in business. In 1916, he was sued for failure to pay rent on his office, and the poor state of his financial affairs was exposed. He declared bankruptcy the same year. Although some sources claim he returned to Southern California in the 1930s and regained a portion of his fortune investing in oil fields, other sources say there's little evidence to suggest he made these investments or restored his fortune and that he died instead in obscurity.

== Personal life and death ==
Calhoun married Sarah Porter Williams on November 4, 1885. The couple had eight children: Martha, Margaret, Patrick, George, John, Andrew, Mildred, and Sarah.

After Sarah Calhoun died in August 1928, Calhoun lived with his son, John C. Calhoun, Jr. at 2036 San Pasqual Street in Pasadena, California. On June 16, 1943, he was struck in front of his home by a teenager street racing with another driver. One of his legs was amputated in the crash, and he suffered severe head trauma.

He died at Huntington Memorial Hospital a few hours later. His funeral was held June 19 in the chapel of the Turner & Stevens Funeral Home. He was interred in the Calhoun family plot at Woodland Cemetery in Clemson, South Carolina.

== See also ==
- Williams Mansion

== Bibliography ==
- Bean, Walter (1952). Boss Ruef's San Francisco: The Story of the Union Labor Party, Big Business, and the Graft Prosecution. Berkeley, Calif.: University of California Press. ISBN 0520000943 – via Archive.org.
- Brechin, Gray (2006). Imperial San Francisco: Urban Power, Earthly Ruin. Berkeley, Calif.: University of California Press. ISBN 9780520933484 – via Archive.org.
- Bremer, Deanna L.; Fisher, Hugh P. (2004). Euclid Golf Neighborhood. Charleston, S.C.: Arcadia Publishing. ISBN 9780738532547 – via Google Books.
- Harrison, Mitchell Charles (1902). Prominent and Progressive Americans: An Encyclopaedia of Contemporaneous Biography. New York: New York Tribune. p. 48 – via Archive.org. "Patrick Calhoun 1856."
- Ingham, John N. (1983). Biographical Dictionary of American Business Leaders. Volume 1. Westport, Conn.: Greenwood Press. ISBN 9780313239076 – via Google Books.
- King, John Ozias (1958). The Early History of the Houston Oil Company of Texas, 1901-1908. Houston: University of Houston.
- Knight, Robert Edward Lee (1960). Industrial Relations in the San Francisco Bay Area, 1900-1918. Berkeley, Calif.: University of California Press – via Archive.org.
- Moffat, Francis (1977). Dancing on the Brink of the World: The Rise and Fall of San Francisco Society. New York: Putnam. ISBN 9780399117213 – via Archive.org.
- Onofrio, Jan (2000). South Carolina Biographical Dictionary. Volume 2. St. Clair Shores, Mich.: Somerset Publishers. ISBN 9780403093076 – via Google Books.
- Salisbury, Edward Elbridge (1880). Biographical Memoranda Respecting All Who Ever Were Members of the Class of 1832. New Haven, Conn.: Yale University Class of 1832 – via Google Books.
- Smith, Dennis (2005). San Francisco Is Burning: The Untold Story of the 1906 Earthquake and Fires. New York: Viking. ISBN 9780670034420 – via Archive.org.
