= San Bernardino Ranch =

- U.S. National Register of Historic Places
- U.S. National Historic Landmark District
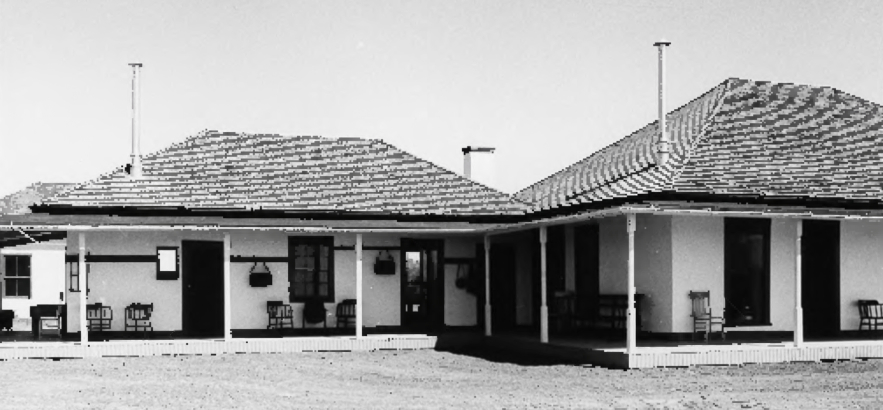
- Main ranch house, 1985

- Location within Arizona Location within the United States
- Location: Cochise County, Arizona, United States
- Nearest city: Douglas, Arizona
- Coordinates: 31°20′11″N 109°16′47″W
- Area: 205 acres (83 ha)
- Built: 1822
- NRHP reference No.: 66000170

Significant dates
- Added to NRHP: October 15, 1966
- Designated NHLD: July 19, 1964

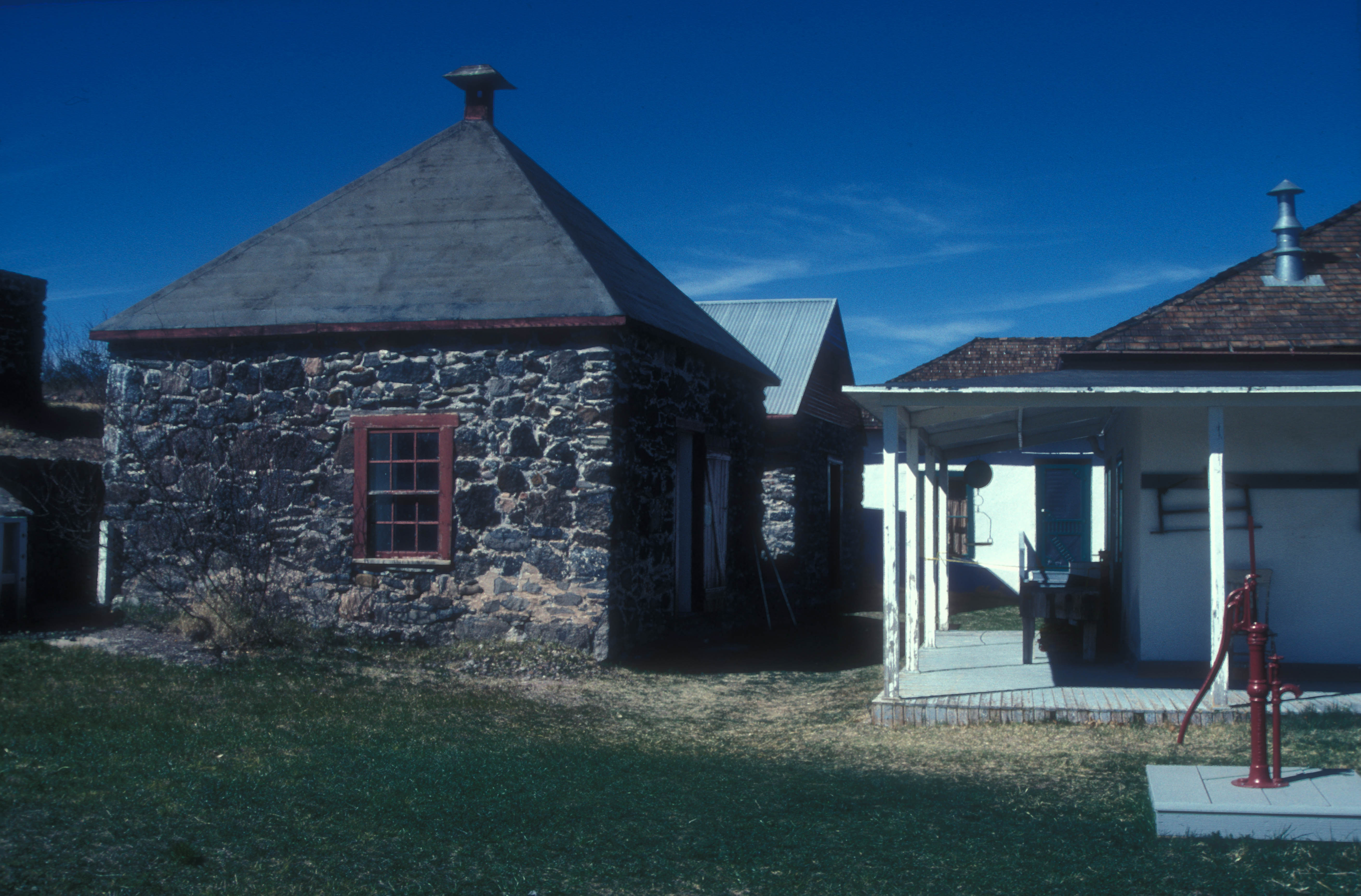
San Bernardino Ranch porch and outbuildings in 2007

San Bernardino Ranch is a historic ranch house in the southern San Bernardino Valley near the San Bernardino National Wildlife Refuge in extreme southeast Cochise County, Arizona, United States. It is significant for its association with the beginning of cattle ranching in southern Arizona and northern Mexico. The ranchland and valley are part of the headwaters region of the Yaqui River.

The site is also known as the Slaughter Ranch, for it was the home of the Old West lawman John Horton Slaughter from the 1880s until his death in 1922. In 1911, during the conflict known as the Border War, a United States Army camp was established at the ranch and called Camp San Bernardino Ranch, or the Slaughter Ranch Outpost.

The site was declared a National Historic Landmark in 1964 for its association with Slaughter. Today, the compound includes the preserved ranch house, wash house, icehouse, granary, and commissary. Much of it is set up as a museum known as the Johnson Historical Museum of the Southwest.

== History ==
The San Bernardino Valley was originally home to Southern Athabaskan Native American tribes. Spanish missionaries, including Jesuit missionary Father Eusebio Kino, were the first Europeans to visit the site, in 1694. The Marqués de Rubí proposed the building of the San Bernardino Garrison, which was occupied from 1775 to 1780. The original Mexican land grant of 73,240 acres (29,640 ha), where the San Bernardino Ranch sits today, was purchased by Ignacio Perez in 1822 for 90 pesos (plus additional fees). He was chased from his land grant by local Apaches in the 1830s. In 1846, the Mormon Battalion came through the property on their way to California. A historical marker commemorating their passage can now be seen at the beginning of the road leading to the front gate. Prospectors and pioneers continued to trek through the valley in the 1840s and 1850s on their way to California. On June 8, 1854, the valley officially became part of the United States following the Gadsden Purchase from Mexico.

=== Slaughter Ranch ===
In 1884, John Horton Slaughter, a cowboy and lawman originally from Texas, purchased 65,000 acres (26,000 ha) from Perez's heirs for about $80,000. Two-thirds of his property lay in Mexico, with the remaining third in the Arizona Territory. The ruins on the property are now owned by the United States Fish and Wildlife Service, where a Mormon employee of Slaughter's built a home (called the Mormon House) straddling the U.S.–Mexico border so he could keep a wife in the United States and a wife in Mexico. The home was two rooms, one on each side of the border, with a breezeway connecting them.

Slaughter was elected sheriff of Cochise County, Arizona, in 1886, and served two terms through 1890. He became well known for restoring lawfulness in towns like Tombstone after the infamous 1881 Gunfight at the OK Corral. The Tombstone jail was once known as the "Hotel de Slaughter". He helped tame the Arizona Territory and was known to return from searching for outlaws with only their horses and equipment. Slaughter and his second wife, Viola Slaughter (born Cora Viola Howell), as well as her parents, Amazon and Mary Ann Howell, and Slaughter's children from his first marriage, Addie and Willie, lived at the ranch for many years. The 7.6 M_{w} Sonora earthquake, centered in Bavispe, Sonora, destroyed the Howell residence on the property in 1887. The Howells managed the property until Slaughter finished his second term as sheriff. Slaughter had as many as 500 people living and working on the ranch, including many foster children. The most noteworthy of these was an Apache toddler, Apache May Slaughter, who was adopted by Slaughter after she was abandoned by her parents while Slaughter was tracking her band, who were responsible for killing white men in Arizona. Slaughter and the girl adored each other. She called Slaughter "Don Juan". She died from burns as her dress caught fire at age six. She is buried in the cemetery on what is now the wildlife refuge.

Children were a large part of the ranch activities, and Slaughter loved children. Enough children lived there that the Slaughters built a schoolhouse, Slaughter School District No. 28. The children played in the natural artesian wells on the property and had picnics. Viola would bring the children ice cream from the icehouse. The kids loved swimming in the house pond, which was dammed by Slaughter for irrigation purposes. Slaughter loved technology. His was the first private home in southeastern Arizona to have a telephone. He owned six cars, yet never learned to drive.

From 1911 to 1920, the Slaughter Ranch Outpost for Camp Harry J. Jones in Douglas, Arizona, was established on the ranch, on top of Mesa de la Avanzada overlooking the ranch house. Following the May 4, 1919, murder of Jesse Fisher by Manuel Garcia and Jose Perez, John and Viola moved to Douglas. John Slaughter died peacefully in his sleep on February 16, 1922. Viola sold the property around 1936 to a friend, Marion Williams.

In 1968, Paul and Helen Ramsower purchased the property. On August 7, 1964, the San Bernardino Ranch National Historic Landmark was entered on the National Register of Historic Places. The Ramsowers turned the ranch over to the Nature Conservancy in 1980. The buildings were purchased in 1983 by the Johnson Historical Museum of the Southwest and the United States Fish and Wildlife Service purchased most of the remaining property. Of the original acreage, 131 acres (53 ha) belong to the museum and the rest belongs to the San Bernardino National Wildlife Refuge. The refuge and ranch are home to the Yaqui topminnow and Yaqui chub, two endangered species of fish known to exist only in the valley.

== Buildings ==
Today, the existing buildings at the San Bernardino Ranch have been carefully restored to their early 1900s appearance based on personal accounts and photographic records. The buildings include:

- Ranch house: An adobe structure with a hipped roof and redwood shingles, it contains six bedroom rooms, plus a living room/dining room, bathroom, kitchen, pantry, cowboy dining room, and porch.
- Ice house: Made of natural stone
- Wash house
- Cook's room and commissary
- Granary
- Car Shed: Contains a fully restored 1915 Model T Ford

== Museum ==
The Johnson Historical Museum of the Southwest is open to the public and is frequented by birdwatchers, school children, and people with an interest in Southwest history. It was the brainchild of Mr. Floyd Johnson, who established the museum "so that the youth of tomorrow may know what it was like yesterday."

The San Bernardino Ranch is located at 6153 Geronimo Trail, Douglas, Arizona 85608.

- Hours: Tuesday through Saturday 9:30 am – 3:30 pm
- Admission: $5.00 per adult; under 14 free
- Closed all major holidays
- No pets allowed

== See also ==
- List of National Historic Landmarks in Arizona
- Apache Campaign (1896)
- San Rafael Ranch
- Brown Canyon Ranch
- Faraway Ranch Historic District
