= Texas John Slaughter =

Texas John Slaughter may refer to:

- John Horton Slaughter or Texas John Slaughter (1841–1922), Texas Ranger and Arizona pioneer
- Texas John Slaughter (TV series), a television series produced by Walt Disney for American Broadcasting Company
