= Apache Campaign (1896) =

Part of the Apache Wars

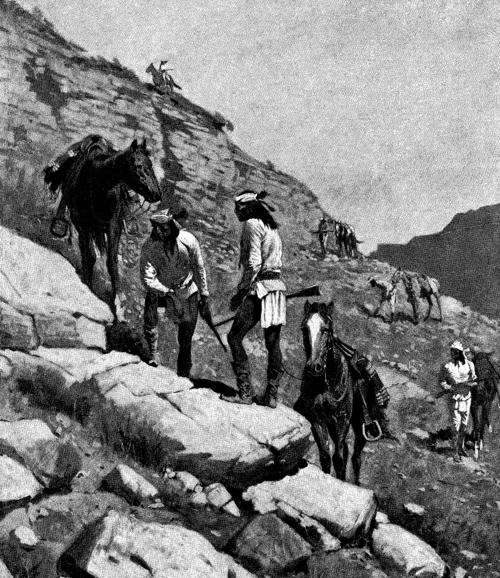
- Apache scouts following Massai's trail, by Frederic Remington, 1898.
- Date: April–June 1896
- Location: United States, Mexico
- Outcome: 2 killed 1 wounded 2 captured

The Apache Campaign of 1896 was the final United States Army operation against Apaches who were raiding and not living in a reservation. It began in April after Apache raiders killed three white American settlers in the Arizona Territory. The Apaches were pursued by the army, which caught up with them in the Four Corners region of Arizona, New Mexico, Sonora and Chihuahua. There were only two important encounters during the campaign and, because both of them occurred in the remote Four Corners region, it is unknown if they took place on American or Mexican soil.

== Background ==
Though the Apache Wars ended at Skeleton Canyon, Arizona in September 1886, when Geronimo surrendered, small bands of Chiricahuas continued to fight against the United States and Mexico from their strongholds in the Sierra Madre. There were two well known Apaches leading small groups: the Apache Kid and Massai. Both leaders were former Indian scouts who had served on opposing sides during Geronimo's War.

The Apache Kid left the reservation in 1887, but he surrendered to the army in June of the same year. He remained in the civilian legal system until November 1889, when he escaped police custody during an incident known as the Kelvin Grade Massacre.

Massai had been on the run since 1882, when he heard of the Apache exodus from San Carlos Apache Indian Reservation. After Geronimo's surrender, Massai became famous for escaping the army in Missouri, while traveling on a train to Florida with other Apache prisoners. Massai then found his way back to Arizona alone and on foot. Contemporary accounts say that Massai and the Apache Kid occasionally cooperated with each other and that most of Massai's raids into the United States may have been attributed to the Kid. According to an article by Britt W. Wilson, in the October 2001 issue of Wild West, by the mid-1890s, hostile Apache activity in southern Arizona increased.

On December 3, 1895, the settlers Elizabeth Merrill and her father, Horatio Merrill, were murdered by Apache raiders near Solomonville and on March 28, 1896, Alfred Hands was killed at his cabin on the eastern side of the Chiricahua Mountains, near the present day town of Portal. Accounts differ: some say that the Apache Kid killed the Merrills and Hands, but Britt Wilson says that Massai killed them. Either way, the newspapers and Arizona citizens pressured the local authorities into doing something about the "renegades".

== Campaign ==
After Hands' death, the army launched an "aggressive campaign" to catch those responsible. Civilian posses also formed to assist the army in the search. There were only two important encounters during the campaign. The first was on May 8, 1896, when a combined scouting expedition under Second Lieutenant Nathan King Averill, 7th Cavalry, found the hostiles encamped in the Peloncillo Mountains, near Lang's Ranch, southwest of Cloverdale, New Mexico. However, other accounts say the skirmish occurred in the Guadalupe Mountains of Mexico, about fifty miles south of the border. Averill reported that his men killed or wounded one Apache man and wounded a woman while the rest fled. One of the Apaches fired a few shots from behind a tree before getting away. The Americans also captured a little girl who was left behind at the camp. She was later taken in by a member of the expedition, John Horton Slaughter, who claimed that he was the one who killed the Apache and that the man he shot was the Apache Kid.

Two or three days after that, Captain James M. Bell, 7th Cavalry, sent Lieutenant Sedgwick Rice out from Fort Grant, Arizona with three Apache Scouts and four soldiers. They first headed for San Simon Station, a town in San Simon Valley, and then south through the Peloncillos. On the next day, May 12, the Apache scouts detected the hostiles' trail and determined that it was made by five horses, one of which had iron horseshoes and the other four were "shod with rawhide." The scouts said that two of the horses were ridden by woman and that only one had a man on its back. It was getting dark by that time so Lieutenant Rice decided to make camp for the night. Early the next morning, on May 13, Rice and his men continued following the trail south until, on May 14, it turned east towards the Animas Valley of New Mexico.

Around this time, Rice met some of Second Lieutenant Averill's men, who were still scouting in the area. It was then decided that Rice would join Averill at his camp, in Guadalupe Canyon, to see Lieutenant Edwin C. Bullock, who was their superior. Before reaching the camp, Averill himself rode up to Rice and told him that the hostiles had crossed the international border about three miles west of Cloverdale. According to Britt Wilson, "Guadalupe Canyon [is] a natural, protected pass leading into Mexico from Arizona Territory, [and] had been used by the Apaches for a long time as an escape route." During Geronimo's War, in June 1885, a small battle was fought there when Chiricahuas attacked an army redoubt and a few years before that it was the site of the Guadalupe Canyon Massacre, in which Mexican policemen killed "Old Man" Clanton and his gang of cattle rustlers. Rice believed that the hostile Apaches were still in the area so, on the next day, May 15, he and Averill left camp and proceeded down the trail with twelve enlisted men, ten Apache scouts and four civilians, including John Slaughter and his ranch foreman, Jesse Fisher. The expedition did not catch up with the hostiles that day but that night, when the soldiers were making camp, Rice sent the Apache scouts ahead of his little column to see if they could locate the enemy camp. Just as Rice hoped, on the morning of May 16, the scouts found the hostiles' camp somewhere in the canyon. In May 1896, the United States Army could not legally enter Mexican territory but the newspapers concluded that the attack did take place south of the border. Adjutant General George D. Ruggles, in Washington, D.C., requested information from Colonel Edwin Vose Sumner about the exact location of the encounter but Britt Wilson says that "Sumner's seemingly equivocal response neither affirmed nor denied that the fight took place in Mexico."

The scouts sent two men back to Rice's camp to inform him of the enemy's presence. Later Rice said that because the hostile Apaches were "in an exceedingly difficult position in a ledge of rock, or rather a pinnacle, about halfway up a very steep mountain," he came up with a plan to surround the hostiles stealthy and cut off any possible escape routes leading down the mountainside. This would be difficult though, the May 22 issue of the Tombstone Prospector described Guadalupe Canyon as being one of "precipitable character... the perpendicular or overhanging rocks and abrupt declivities making it an almost impossibility to get closer than long range shot." Second Lieutenant Averill took with him twelve enlisted men, three Apache scouts, and the four man posse, to move north of the hostiles' camp. From there Averill left one scout and the four civilians to cover the northern side while he, the enlisted men, and two other scouts split up to cover the eastern and the western sides. Lieutenant Rice was left to make the attack with one soldier and the seven remaining scouts. Moving into position took at least five hours but by 4:00 am, on May 17, Rice was "only 250 yards above the Apache camp" and in a place that had a "commanding view" of the natives. Rice wanted to wait until sunrise to begin the attack so he and his men would have to wait at least three more hours. By 6:00 am, the Apache women in camp "began moving about", presenting "easy targets" for the Americans and the scouts. Rice forbid his men from attacking the women, unless in self defense, because the scouts told him that the women would likely surrender if the warriors were killed.

At about 7:00 am, just before sunrise, the Apache man Adelnietze appeared. Adelnietze was with Geronimo's band ten years before, but, instead of surrendering at Skeleton Canyon, he continued to live as a nomad with his family. Rice later reported that Adelnietze was "responding to an alarm call" because one of the women had seen the soldiers at the base of the mountainside. Averill then decided to move closer to the hostiles. Britt Wilson says that "The [second] lieutenant sent a sergeant and two other soldiers to one canyon, and he took the other men behind a peak that he assumed lay on the back side of the Apache camp." When they were in position, Averill noticed a person standing atop a "high pinnacle" on the next ridge over, one of the scouts said that the person was an Apache woman. Averill looked through his field glasses and saw what he thought was Rice so he moved his men to the next ridge and ordered them to make sure they didn't open fire. However, Lieutenant Rice and his men had been watching Adelnietze for a while so the order to open fire was given. Adelnietze was hit by one of the first bullets but he was able to run down the mountainside "through a narrow opening in the rocks," followed by at least one of the women. The soldiers also fired on Massai, who, by that time, was awake and he "made a hasty retreat from the camp, as the troopers' bullets ricocheted harmlessly off the rocks that provided him with cover." Though Britt Wilson repeatedly refers to the second encounter as a "fight," nowhere in his account does it say that the Apaches actually returned fire.

Rice thought that the fleeing Apaches would run straight into Averill's command but he didn't know that Averill had split up with the posse and had spread his men out in a bad way. Averill later blamed his scouts for being unwilling to move any closer to the hostiles' camp. He quoted one as saying; "Camp right here, we sit down, Chericahuas [sic] hear us…." Averill later said that Curley "moved very slowly and finally refused to go any further, either through fear for himself or through fear of alarming the renegades." Curley responded; "Just by myself, without the help of another scout, it was slow trailing. They [the army] ought to have sent two or three scouts along with me to help." When the shooting started, Averill had just finished hiking down to the bottom of Guadalupe Canyon. Wilson says that "The shots chased the three Apache women directly toward Averill," but Curley scared them off by firing "into the air". Curley's account was a little different than Averill's. Curley said that as the women were running towards him he tried to point them out to Averill but he could not see. Therefore, Curley figured he should open fire to not only alarm Averill of the hostiles but to complete his objective by stopping the enemy from fleeing. No matter which account is true, the women sought shelter from the bullets behind a series of rock formations but they later got away. In Averill's official report, he blames Curley for failing to get him into the right position and for "warning" the renegades by opening fire on them. Averill also "expressed dissatisfaction" for the Apache scout he left with John Slaughter and the other three civilians.

When Lieutenant Rice realized that the Apache men were escaping he could only chase after one so he followed Adelnietze's "very bloody trail." Adelnietze escaped though and the pursuit was called off forty-eight hours later because the Apache scouts told Rice that the Apache would likely die from his wound. Rice then went back to see Lieutenant Bullock, who ordered him to keep searching for Adelnietze's body and that of the Apache said to have been wounded on May 8. The Tombstone Prospector later reported that both of the bodies were found and that much of Adelnietze's belongings were captured, including his 1873 Springfield rifle, "with a shortened barrel," a bow, two horses, moccasins and leggings "filled with blood." The scouts also found articles of clothing that belonged to the murdered Elizabeth Merill and her father. All of Adelnietze's belongings were found at the camp, except the leggings, which were picked up from an area of "ground [that] was saturated with blood." Despite the fact that the Apaches got away, General Nelson A. Miles said; "The major-general commanding the army appreciates very highly the skill, fortitude, and perseverance of the troops… and the success so far achieved…. First Lieutenant Sedgwick Rice and Second Lieutenant N.K. Averill, Seventh Cavalry, and the non-commissioned officers, guides and Indian scouts under their command are highly commended."

After May 17, there was only one other notable encounter between the United States Army and off reservation Apaches during the campaign. On June 4, 1896, the Americans received permission from the Mexican government to pursue Apaches across the international border and shortly thereafter a small expedition was sent into Sonora. On June 21, Lieutenant William Yates was leading the expedition through Pulpito Mountain, sixty miles south of the border, when he came across an Apache camp. An immediate attack was ordered, which led to the capture of a five-year-old girl, a horse, and some camping equipment. There was no fighting though and it was reported that four warriors, four women and one other child got away. American newspapers claimed the Apache scouts that participated in the expedition had warned the Apache camp before the attack began, allowing the majority time to escape.

== Aftermath ==
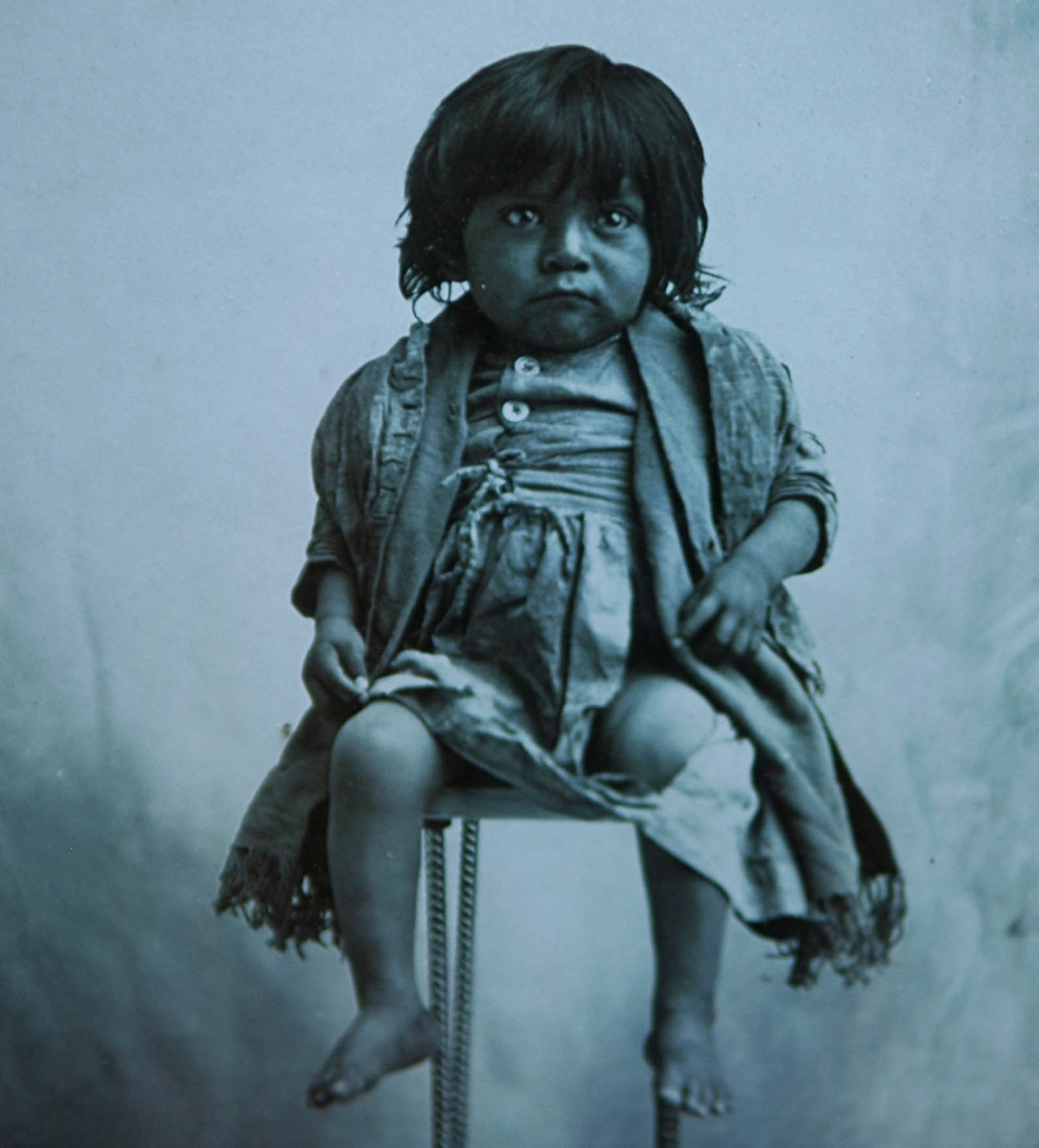
Apache May, photographed by C. S. Fly in Tombstone, Arizona.

The Apache Campaign of 1896 was the last time the United States Army would go after Apaches but, according to author and historian Lynda Sánchez, of Lincoln, New Mexico, "violent episodes" between Apaches and American or Mexican settlers continued into the 1930s. Britt Wilson says that Massai was ambushed and killed in September 1906 by a New Mexican posse. However, others believed that the Apache Kid was the man who died that day so the area was named the Apache Kid Wilderness. The little Apache girl, captured on May 8, went to live with John Slaughter at the San Bernardino Ranch, which is now a national historic site. She was named Apache May, for the month in which she was found. Both John and his wife, Viola, believed that the Apache Kid was the father of the little girl and that she must have been about twelve months old. When found, Apache May was wearing a dress made out of Elizabeth Merill's "muslin election poster" so Viola made some new clothes for her. Accounts differ, but somehow, in 1901, Apache May's dress caught on fire. The girl was severely burned and she died the following morning. Her remains now rest at the Slaughter family cemetery, located on the ranch, and her dress has been preserved by the Arizona Historical Society.

== See also ==
- Skeleton Canyon Shootout
