= John Handy (disambiguation) =

John Handy (born 1933) is an American jazz alto saxophonist from Texas.

John Handy may also refer to:

- John C. Handy (1844–1891), Tucson physician and surgeon
- Captain John Handy (1900–1971), American jazz alto saxophonist from Mississippi
- John Killeen Handy (politician) (1834–1874), Australian Queensland politician
- John W. Handy (born 1944), United States Air Force general

== See also ==
- Jack Handey (born 1949), American comedian
