= Apache War =

There are several events involving the Apache known as Apache War, the Apache Wars, or Apache Campaign:

- Apache–Mexico Wars (1600s–1915)
- Apache Wars (1849–1924)
- Jicarilla War (1849–1855)
- Chiricahua Wars (1851–1886)
- Chiricahua War (1860–1873)
- Yavapai War (1871–1875)
- Apache Campaign (1873)
- Renegade Period (1879–1924)
- Victorio's War (1879–1881)
- Geronimo's War (1881–1886)
- Apache Campaign (1889–1890)
- Apache Campaign (1896)
