= Viola Slaughter =

American rancher (1860–1941)

- Born: September 18, 1860; Missouri, US
- Died: March 1941 (aged 80); Douglas, Cochise County; Arizona
- Occupation: Rancher
- Spouse: John Horton Slaughter (married 1879–1922, his death)
- Children: Addie Slaughter (stepdaughter) Willie Slaughter (stepson) Apache May (adopted daughter)
- Parent(s): Amazon and Mary Ann Howell
- Relatives: Daniel Boone (great-great-grandfather)

Cora Viola Howell (September 18, 1860–March 1941), later to become Viola Slaughter, was an Arizona rancher and the wife of Sheriff John Horton Slaughter, known as Texas John Slaughter.

== Early years ==
Viola Slaughter was born in Missouri to Amazon and Mary Ann Howell.

By the time Viola was eighteen, the Howell family had moved to a ranch near Roswell in the New Mexico Territory. It was while living there that Viola met John Slaughter, and they quickly fell in love. Viola would confess herself that "it was love at first sight" to a writer. John was thirty-seven and Viola only eighteen when they met. John had two small children from his first marriage to the former Eliza Adeline Harris, who died in 1877 of smallpox.

== Marriage ==
Viola's mother vehemently opposed her daughter's interest in Slaughter. Her father, however, thought more positively about the relationship. By April 1879, Viola told her mother that she would marry John in about two weeks. Her mother screamed. With her father's blessing, the couple parted the next morning to Tularosa, also in the New Mexico Territory, where they wed on April 16.

== Motherly devotion ==
Viola Slaughter wanted to be a mother all of her life; because of this, she admittedly took a motherly love towards John's two children. Slaughter would never become a natural mother, but she and John adopted several children, among them, an Apache baby girl found by Slaughter in Mexico. Apache May had been abandoned there.

Apache May Slaughter died at the age of five, in 1900, the victim of a fire.

== From Arizona and back ==
Soon after marrying, the Slaughters arrived at Sulphur Springs, where they lived in a two-room house. This would mark the beginning of the relationship between her and John's two children, Addie and Willie. John told her that he would send them to Texas to live with his brother, Viola convinced him not to do so because she was already feeling love for the children.

The Slaughters opened a supermarket near Tombstone in 1880. In order to get supplies, such as meat, the Slaughters had to travel through Apache territory, a trip which frightened Viola. In 1881, the Slaughters returned to New Mexico, by train. John needed more cattle for his ranch. During the return trip, the Slaughters faced a blizzard, and sixteen of the seventeen travellers in the Slaughter group suffered from frostbite. Only Addie Slaughter escaped unharmed. She was attached to a buffalo robe, which protected her from harm.

Beginning in the spring of 1883, John took his family on a trip that he thought would land him in Oregon, where he dreamed of having a ranch by Snake River. His plans were ruined, however, when he began hemorrhaging while in Idaho from an old condition of tuberculosis. The Slaughters had to return immediately to Arizona. Soon, they purchased the San Bernardino Mexican land grant. Their new home was large enough to be located in two countries: half of the ranch was in the United States, the other half in Mexico. The San Bernardino Ranch had 65,000 acres (260 km^{2}), which John had bought for one dollar and twenty five cents each.

== Sheriff's wife ==
Although the house had been abandoned, and deteriorated, for fifty years, Viola Slaughter was very happy with her new house. She marveled at the views nearby and the fact that, just by walking from one side of the house to the other, she would be crossing countries every time. From 1886 to 1890, Slaughter lived in Tombstone, where he was the sheriff. However, they kept the ranch.

In 1887, one of the few earthquakes in the history of Arizona destroyed part of the San Bernardino Ranch. Slaughter felt quite disappointed about his life as a rancher and decided to retire from being a working rancher once his days as sheriff were over. Viola, however, convinced him otherwise. She promised to help with the ranching and said, "just give me a plain house with wide board floors, muslin ceilings and board finish around the adobes. That's all I want".

In 1892, the Slaughters, having remodeled their ranch, moved there permanently. Viola Slaughter also became famous across the west for her curing abilities, and cowboys would come from as far as New Mexico to get treatments from her. She also joined Slaughter on his frequent trips to Mexico; they helped catch a killer there, and usually brought cattle from as far as Hermosillo. Viola Slaughter would later tell Charles Morgan Wood that she heard one time that John had been killed in Mexico by Apaches, and she got on a wagon and headed towards the frontier. Three days later, she saw her husband from afar. Viola was so happy that she felt ill, but she hid her weak feeling when her husband got to her, and he did not notice that she was not feeling good.

In 1896, Slaughter went on the attack and followed Apaches to Mexico. Instead, he found the abandoned baby, Apache May.

== Wealth ==
The Slaughters became wealthy. Viola was able to wear expensive dresses to dinner. The family dinners were equally known in Arizona society circles, as these usually included fresh vegetables, jam, cream, and other exquisite ingredients of the era.

The Slaughters were known for being an affable family, and the San Bernardino Ranch became a hang-out place for the rich, the poor, neighbors, friends, and passersby who happened to come along and felt like talking to someone.

== Murder, death ==
On May 4, 1921, a foreman, Jesse Fisher, was murdered at the San Bernardino Ranch by robbers. As the ranch was being robbed, Slaughter believed that he was in danger; so he asked Fisher to check on the horses, and Slaughter moved into a bedroom without windows. Seconds later, Fisher was murdered. One of the killers was one of the Slaughters' adopted children, a fact which left the couple distraught. Convinced that they needed to leave the ranch, the Slaughters moved to Douglas. On his last overnight visit to the ranch in 1922, John Slaughter died there.

Viola remained active, although she stayed in Douglas for the remainder of her life. She traveled for news interviews. In 1939, as the grand marshal of Douglas' town rodeo parade, she rode a horse through the streets of the border city. On February 27, 1941, Addie Slaughter suffered a fatal heart attack while visiting Viola. About a month later, overcome with depression, Viola herself died.

== See also ==
- Theodore Boggs
- Texas John Slaughter
