= Apache May Slaughter =

Apache girl (1895–1900)

Apache Slaughter
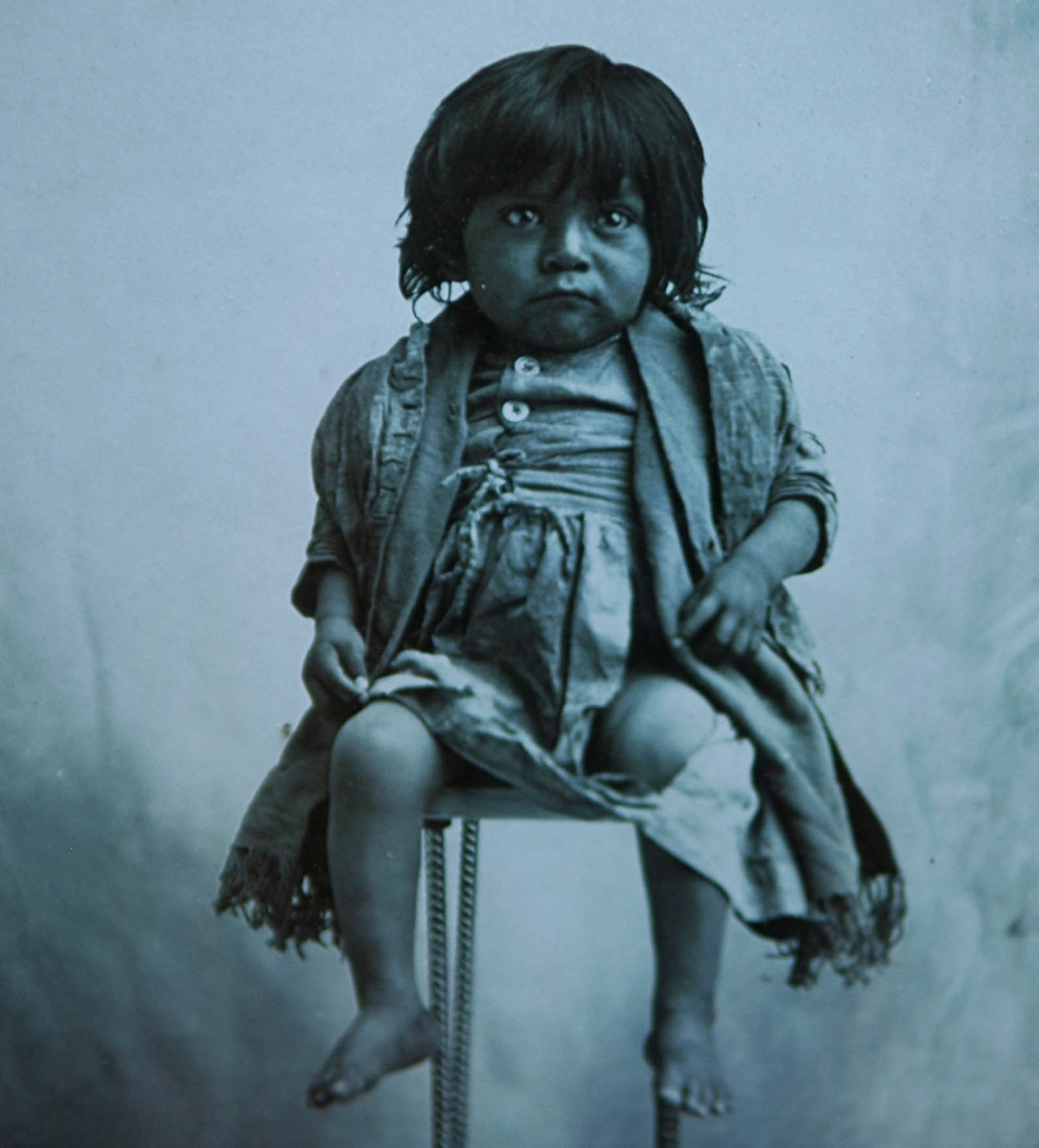
- Apache May, photographed by C.S. Fly.
- Born: 1895
- Died: 1900 (aged 4–5)
- Parent(s): John Horton Slaughter; Viola Slaughter
- Relatives: Daniel Boone (great-great-great-grandfather)

Apache May Slaughter (c. 1895 – 1900) was the adopted daughter of Tombstone, Arizona sheriff John Slaughter and his wife Viola.

Apache May was found by John Slaughter as he was following a group of Apaches in Mexico. She had been abandoned to her luck by her natural parents. John Slaughter returned to Arizona with Apache May. When she was adopted by the couple, she also became Daniel Boone's great great great granddaughter.

Apache May's name came from her background, and her month of birth. Calculating her age, the Slaughters were convinced she was born in the month of May of that year.

== Young Celebrity ==
Apache May Slaughter became a young celebrity across Arizona, because many newspapers and publications speculated about the girl's natural parents, her relation to the Apaches and whether those factors would affect her personality in the future and turn her into a violent person without morals. Photographers were no strangers to the small girl; she was constantly pictured and appeared in most Arizona publications of the era.

The Slaughters loved Apache May. She usually wore dresses made out of posters of different kinds. These were chosen for her by the Slaughters, who supposed that she would look outstanding in the small dresses.

Apache May died at the Slaughters' San Bernardino Ranch when one of her dresses caught fire as she was playing near a pot with boiling water.

== See also ==
- Apache Campaign (1896)
