= George E. Goodfellow =

American physician and naturalist (1855–1910)

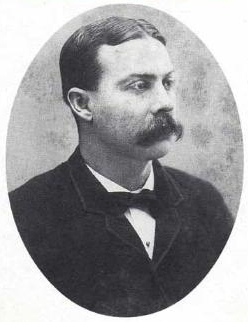
- Dr. George E. Goodfellow
- Born: December 23, 1855; Downieville, California
- Died: December 7, 1910 (aged 54); Los Angeles, California
- Education: United States Naval Academy
- Occupations: Physician, surgeon
- Known for: Authority on gunshot wounds
- Spouses: Katherine Colt; Mary Elizabeth
- Children: Edith Goodfellow; George M. Goodfellow

George Emory Goodfellow (December 23, 1855 – December 7, 1910) was a physician and naturalist in the 19th- and early 20th-century American Old West who developed a reputation as the United States' foremost expert in treating gunshot wounds. As a medical practitioner in Tombstone, Arizona Territory, Goodfellow treated numerous bullet wounds to both lawmen and outlaws. He recorded several significant medical firsts throughout his career, including performing the first documented laparotomy for treating an abdominal gunshot wound and the first perineal prostatectomy to remove an enlarged prostate. He also pioneered the use of spinal anesthesia and sterile techniques in treating gunshot wounds and is regarded as the first civilian trauma surgeon.

Goodfellow was known as a pugnacious, "brilliant and versatile" physician with wide-ranging interests. He not only practiced medicine but also conducted research into the venom of gila monsters; published the first surface rupture map of an earthquake in North America; interviewed Geronimo; and played a role in brokering a peace settlement in the Spanish–American War. He was a skilled boxer, and in his first year at the United States Naval Academy he became the academy's boxing champion, though he was soon dismissed for his involvement in a hazing incident against the first African-American to attend the institution. In 1889, he got into a fight with another man and stabbed him, but was found to have acted in self-defense.

Goodfellow treated Virgil Earp and Morgan Earp after they were wounded in the Gunfight at the O.K. Corral. His testimony later helped absolve the Earps and Doc Holliday of murder charges for having shot and killed three outlaw Cowboys during the gunfight. He treated Virgil again when he was maimed in an ambush and rushed to Morgan's side when he was mortally wounded by an assassin. Goodfellow left Tombstone in 1889 and established a successful practice in Tucson before moving to San Francisco in 1899 and opening a medical office there. He lost his practice and all of his personal belongings in the 1906 San Francisco earthquake and subsequently returned to the Southwest, where he became the chief surgeon for the Southern Pacific Railroad in Mexico. He fell ill in 1910 and died later that year in Los Angeles.

== Early life and education ==
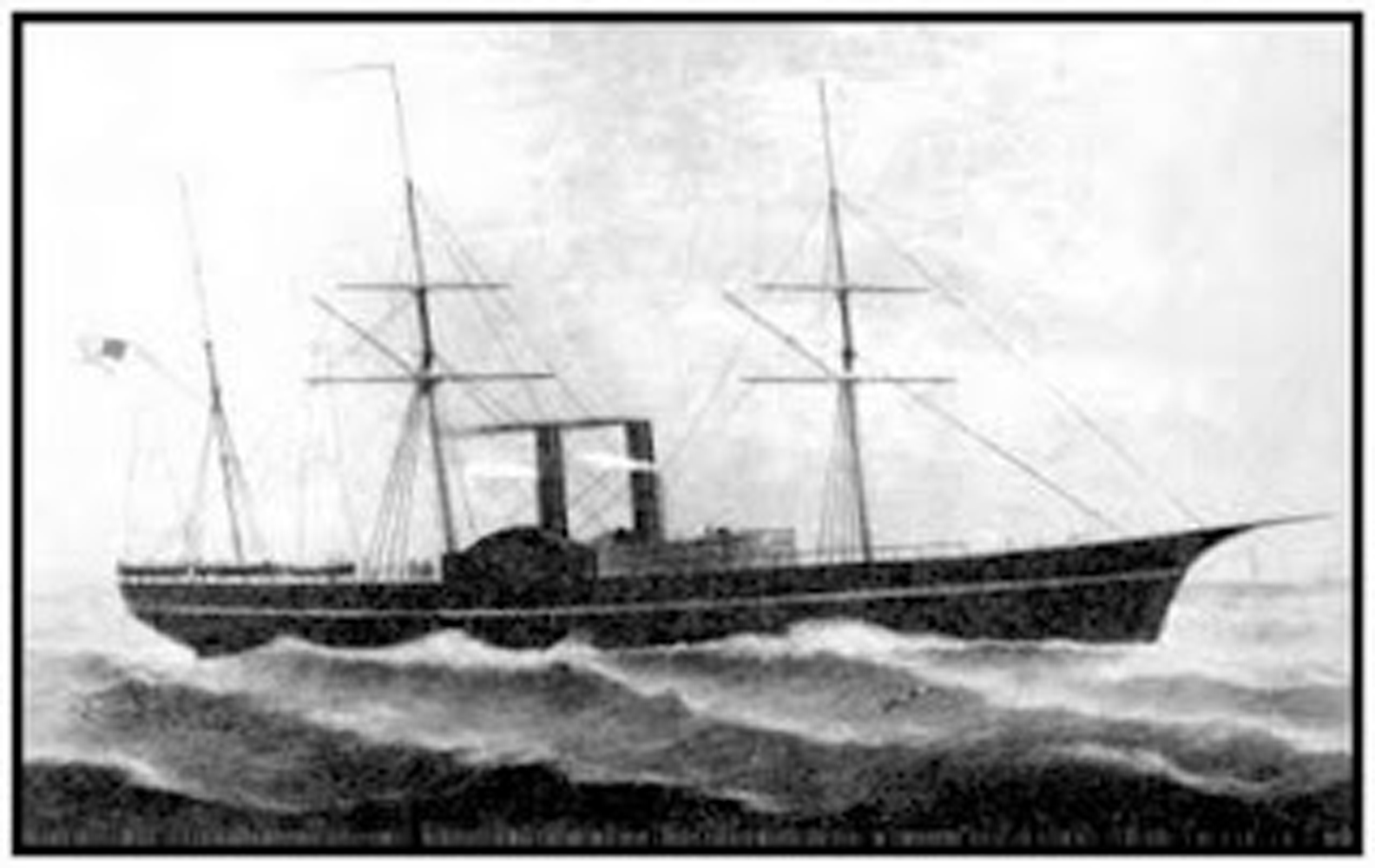
Goodfellow's mother returned to San Francisco aboard the Pacific Mail Steamship Company ship S.S. Golden Gate

Goodfellow's father, Milton J. Goodfellow, came to California in 1853 to mine for gold. His mother, Amanda Baskin Goodfellow, followed two years later, arriving in San Francisco on the steamship Golden Gate. Goodfellow was born on December 23, 1855, in Downieville, California, then one of the largest cities in the state. His parents also had two daughters, Mary Catherine ("Kitty") and Bessie. His father became a mining engineer and maintained an interest in medicine. Goodfellow grew up around California Gold Rush mining camps and developed a deep interest in both mining and medicine. When he was 12, his parents sent him across the country to a private school in Pennsylvania. He returned to California two years later where he attended the California Military Academy in Oakland. He was then accepted to the University of California at Berkeley, where he studied civil engineering for one year before he applied to the United States Naval Academy. In 1870, he was living with his family in Treasure City, Nevada, where his father was a mining superintendent.

=== Dismissed from Naval Academy ===
Goodfellow declined a congressional appointment to the United States Military Academy at West Point, and instead accepted an appointment from Nevada congressional representative C.W. Kendall to attend the United States Naval Academy, arriving there in June 1872. He became the school's resident boxing champion and was well accepted by his fellow midshipmen. Like many of his fellow cadets, he took exception to the presence of the academy's first black cadet, James H. Conyers.

While marching, Goodfellow and another cadet began kicking and punching Conyers, who had been shunned and constantly and brutally harassed since his arrival. Goodfellow later knocked Conyers down some stairs. News of the incidents and the constant hazing experienced by Conyers leaked to the newspapers, and a three-man board was convened to investigate the attacks. Goodfellow denied any wrongdoing and Conyers claimed he could not identify any of his attackers. The board nonetheless concluded, "His persecutors are left then without any excuse or palliation except the inadmissible one of prejudice." The review board believed the academy needed to give Conyers a fair chance at succeeding on his own merits, and recommended that strong measures should be taken. In December 1872, Goodfellow and two other students were dismissed from the academy.

Goodfellow immediately set about trying to get reinstated. His mother Amanda wrote a personal letter to First Lady Julia Grant, who was known to consider blacks as inferior and whose family had owned slaves before the Civil War. Amanda closed her letter by reminding the first lady of their mutual friends. Goodfellow also appealed to his mother's uncle and United States Attorney Robert N. Baskin for assistance. Baskin interceded with his friend, President Ulysses S. Grant, who promised to reinstate Goodfellow, but the uncle left his office and Grant was busy seeking re-election. None of the efforts for reinstatement proved fruitful.

=== Medical education ===
Concerned about disappointing his father, Goodfellow sought out his cousin, Dr. T.H. Lashells, in Meadville, Pennsylvania, and read for medicine. He found he had a ready aptitude for the medical field and moved to Cleveland, Ohio, where an uncle lived. He attended Wooster University Medical School and on February 23, 1876, he graduated with honors.

Goodfellow briefly opened a medical practice in Oakland. He was soon invited by his father to join him in Yavapai County, Arizona Territory, where Milton was a mining executive for Peck, Mine and Mill. Goodfellow worked in Prescott as the company physician for the next two years until he secured permission to serve with George Armstrong Custer's 7th Cavalry. His orders to join the unit were delayed, however, and he missed the Battle of the Little Bighorn on June 25, 1876, at which most of the unit was destroyed. Instead, Goodfellow joined the U.S. Army as acting assistant surgeon at Fort Whipple in Prescott. In 1879, he became for a brief period the contract surgeon at Fort Lowell near Tucson.

== Family ==
On November 4, 1876, Goodfellow married Katherine ("Kate") Colt, daughter of Henry Tracy Colt, the proprietor of Meadville's Colt House, whom he had met while reading medicine in Meadville. Ironically, she was a cousin to Samuel Colt, inventor of the Colt revolver, a weapon that would later play a significant role in Goodfellow's medical practice. The Goodfellows left Meadville immediately after they were married, during the week of November 9, 1876, and traveled to Oakland, California.

The Goodfellows had a daughter, Edith, born on October 22, 1879, in Oakland. They also had a son, George Milton, born in May 1882 in Tombstone, Arizona Territory, who died from "general bleeding" on July 18. Kate Goodfellow died on August 16, 1891, at her mother-in-law's home in Oakland. Goodfellow and his daughter Edith caught the train to Oakland from Benson, Arizona, and when his wife died, he and Edith returned to Tombstone before he relocated to Tucson and took over the practice of his deceased friend, Dr. John C. Handy. Goodfellow married again, to Mary Elizabeth, sometime before March 1906.

== Medical practice in Tombstone ==
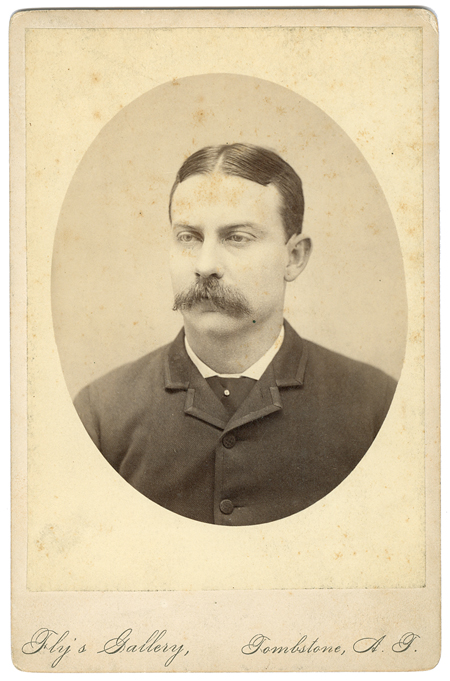
A cabinet photograph of Dr. Goodfellow by C.S. Fly, a noted Tombstone, Arizona Territory photographer

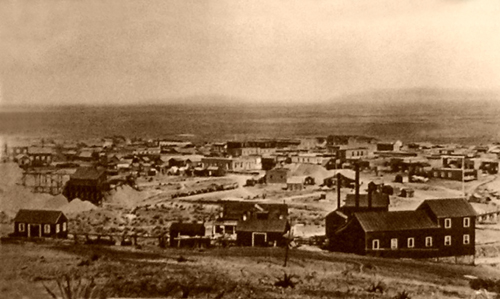
Goodfellow arrived in Tombstone in 1880 as the town was booming during its silver mining peak and practiced there for 11 years

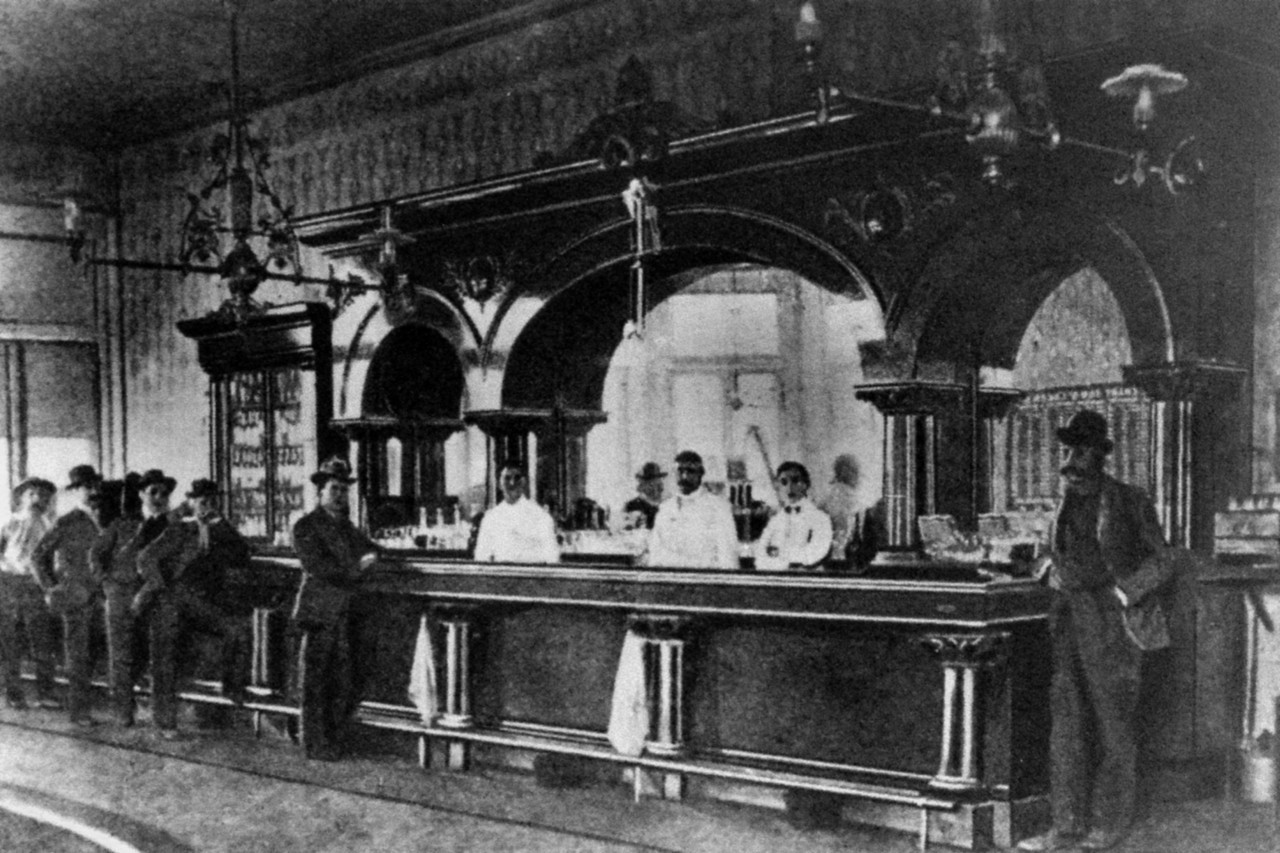
Dr. Goodfellow's office was on the second floor of the Crystal Palace Saloon, seen here in 1885

In 1880, Goodfellow decided to open his own medical practice. On September 15, he canceled his Army contract and he and his wife moved to the silver mining boomtown of Tombstone, in Cochise County, Arizona Territory. The town was less than a year old, but its population had exploded from about 100 residents in March 1879, when it consisted mostly of wooden shacks and tents. By the fall of 1879 more than a thousand miners and merchants lived in a canvas-and-matchstick camp built on top of the richest silver strike in the United States. When Goodfellow arrived the town had a population of more than 2,000. There were already 12 doctors practicing in Tombstone, but only Goodfellow and three others had medical school diplomas.

At age 25, Goodfellow opened an office on the second floor of the Crystal Palace Saloon, one of the most luxurious saloons in the West. It was also the location of offices for other notable officials, including County Coroner Dr. H.M. Mathews, Deputy U.S. Marshal Virgil Earp, attorney George W. Berry, Cochise County Sheriff Johnny Behan, and justice of the peace Wells Spicer. When he was not busy tending to patients, Goodfellow walked down the outside stairs to the saloon below, where he spent many hours drinking, playing faro, and betting on horse races, foot races, wrestling and boxing matches. He reportedly got along well with all of the town's diverse social classes, from the hardscrabble miners to the wealthy elite, as well as characters like the notoriously drunk lawyer Allen English.

Goodfellow lost his office when the saloon and most of downtown Tombstone burned to the ground on May 26, 1882. The building was rebuilt and the Crystal Palace earned a reputation for its gambling, entertainment, food and the best brands of wines, liquors, and cigars. Goodfellow cared for the indigent and was reimbursed by the county at the rate of $8,000 to $12,000 per year.

Tombstone was a dangerous frontier town at the time and the scene of considerable conflict. Most of the leading cattlemen as well as numerous local outlaws, including the Cowboys, were Confederate sympathizers and Democrats from Southern states, especially Missouri and Texas. The mine and business owners, miners, city lawmen including brothers Virgil, Morgan, and Wyatt Earp, and most of the other townspeople were largely Republicans from the Northern states. There was also the fundamental conflict over resources and land, of traditional, Southern-style, "small government" agrarianism of the rural Cowboys contrasted to Northern-style industrial capitalism. The Tombstone Daily Journal asked in March 1881 how a hundred outlaws could terrorize the best system of government in the world, asking, "Can not the marshal summon a posse and throw the ruffians out?" Goodfellow later famously described Tombstone as the "condensation of wickedness."

=== Treatment of O.K. Corral lawmen ===
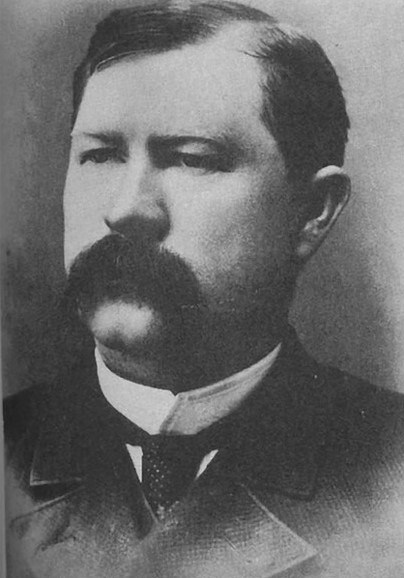
Virgil Earp

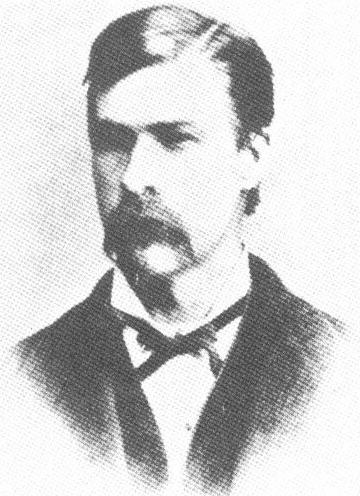
Morgan Earp

During the Gunfight at the O.K. Corral on October 26, 1881, Deputy U.S. Marshal Virgil Earp was shot through the calf and Assistant Deputy U.S. Marshal Morgan Earp was shot across both shoulder blades. Doc Holliday was grazed by a bullet. Goodfellow treated both Earps' wounds. Cowboy Billy Clanton, who had been mortally wounded in the shootout, asked someone to remove his boots before he died; Goodfellow was present and obliged.

After the gunfight, Ike Clanton filed murder charges against the Earps and Doc Holliday. Goodfellow reviewed Dr. H.M. Mathew's autopsy reports on the three outlaw cowboys the Earps and Holiday had killed: Billy Clanton and brothers Tom and Frank McLaury. Goodfellow's testimony about the nature of Billy Clanton's wounds during the hearing supported the defendants' version of events, that Billy's arm could not have been positioned holding his coats open by the lapels or raised in the air, as witnesses loyal to the Cowboys testified. Goodfellow's testimony was helpful in exonerating the Earps and the judge ruled that the lawmen had acted in self-defense.

Goodfellow treated Virgil Earp again two months later, on December 28, 1881, after he was ambushed. At about 11:30 pm that night, three men hid in an unfinished building across Allen Street from the Cosmopolitan Hotel where the Earps were staying. They shot Virgil as he walked from the Oriental Saloon to his room, hitting him in the back and left arm with three loads of double-barreled buckshot from about 60 feet (18 m). Goodfellow advised Virgil that the arm ought to be amputated, but Virgil refused. Goodfellow operated on Virgil in the Cosmopolitan Hotel using the medical tools he had in his bag, and asked George Parsons and another fellow to fetch some supplies from the hospital. Virgil had a longitudinal fracture of the humerus and elbow that could not be repaired, requiring Goodfellow to remove more than 3 inches (76 mm) of shattered humerus bone from Virgil's left arm, leaving him permanently crippled.

The next victim of the feud was Morgan Earp. At 10:50 pm on March 18, 1882, Morgan was playing a round of billiards at the Campbell & Hatch Billiard Parlor against owner Bob Hatch. Dan Tipton, Sherman McMaster, and Wyatt Earp watched, having also received death threats that same day. An unknown assailant shot Morgan through a glass-windowed, locked door that opened onto a dark alley between Allen and Fremont Streets. Morgan was struck in the back on the left of his spine and the bullet exited the front of his body near his gall bladder before lodging in the thigh of mining foreman George A.B. Berry. Morgan was mortally wounded and could not stand even with assistance. They laid him on a nearby lounge where he died within the hour. Drs. Matthews, Millar, and Goodfellow all examined Morgan. Even Goodfellow, recognized in the United States as the nation's leading expert at treating abdominal gunshot wounds, concluded that Morgan's wounds were fatal.

As County Coroner, Goodfellow conducted Morgan Earp's autopsy. He found the bullet "entering the body just to the left of the spinal column in the region of the left kidney emerging on the right side of the body in the region of the gall bladder. It certainly injured the great vessels of the body causing hemorrhage which undoubtedly causes death. It also injured the spinal column. It passed through the left kidney and also through the loin." Berry recovered from his wound.

=== Treatment of cowboys ===
Goodfellow treated outlaws as well as lawmen, including a number of the notorious Cochise County Cowboys active in the Tombstone area during the 1880s. On May 26, 1881, the Arizona Daily Star reported that Curly Bill Brocius was drunk when he got into an argument with Lincoln County War veteran Jim Wallace, who had insulted Brocius' friend and ally, Tombstone Deputy Marshal Billy Breakenridge. Brocius took offense and even though Wallace apologized, Brocius threatened to kill him. When Wallace left, Curly Bill followed him and Wallace shot him though the cheek and neck. Goodfellow treated Brocius, who recovered after several weeks. Marshal Breakenridge arrested Wallace but the court ruled he had acted in self-defense.

Goodfellow was noted for his wry humor. Once, a gambler named McIntire was shot and killed during an argument over a card game; Goodfellow performed an autopsy on the man and wrote in his report that he had done "the necessary assessment work and found the body full of lead, but too badly punctured to hold whiskey."

=== County Coroner ===
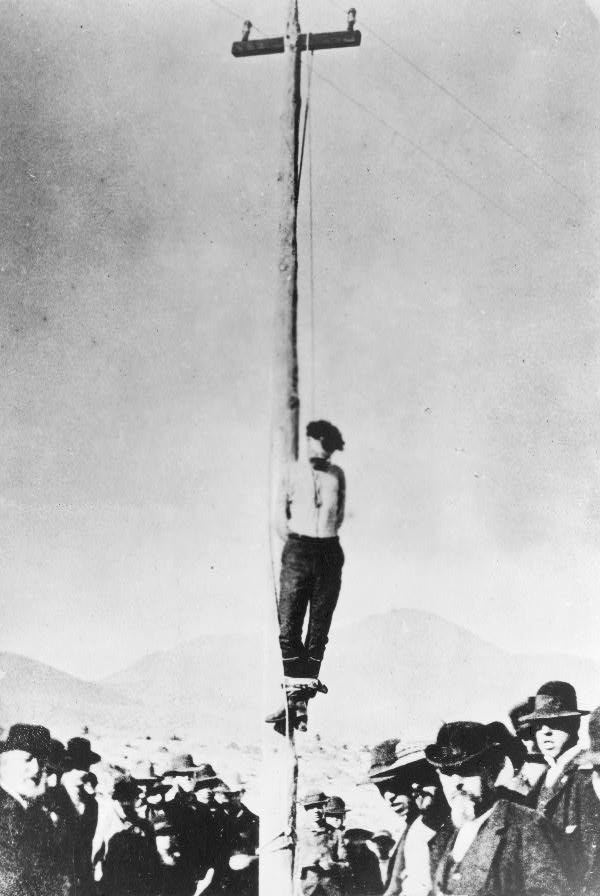
Tombstone citizens lynched John Heath (also spelled Heith) on February 22, 1884. As County Coroner, Goodfellow ruled he died of "strangulation, self-inflicted or otherwise."

On the morning of December 8, 1883, a group of five outlaw Cowboys robbed the Goldwater & Castaneda Mercantile in Bisbee, Arizona, which was rumored to be holding the $7,000 payroll for the Copper Queen Mine. But the payroll had not yet arrived, and the outlaws decided to steal whatever they could take from the safe and the employees and customers. They stole between $900 and $3,000 along with a gold watch and jewelry. In what became known as the Bisbee massacre, some of the robbers waiting outside began shooting passersby, killing four people, including a pregnant woman and her unborn child. John Heath (sometimes spelled Heith) had been a cattle rustler in Texas, but since arriving in Arizona he had served briefly as a Cochise County deputy sheriff and had also opened a saloon. When the five bandits were caught, they quickly implicated Heath as the man who had planned the hold-up. He was arrested and tried separately from the other five, who were convicted of first-degree murder and sentenced to hang.

Heath was convicted of second-degree murder and conspiracy to commit robbery, and the judge could reluctantly sentence him only to a life term at the Yuma Territorial Prison. The citizens of Tombstone were outraged and broke into the jail, forcibly removing Heath and stringing him up from a nearby telegraph pole. Heath's last words were: "I have faced death too many times to be disturbed when it actually comes. ... Don't mutilate my body or shoot me full of holes!" Goodfellow, who was present at Heath's hanging, was County Coroner and responsible for determining the exact cause of death. His wry conclusion reflected the popular sentiment of the town. He ruled that Heath died from "...emphysema of the lungs which might have been, and probably was, caused by strangulation, self-inflicted or otherwise, as in accordance with the medical evidence."

== Authority on gunshot wounds ==
Goodfellow is today remembered for having pioneered the practical use of sterile techniques in treating gunshot wounds by washing the patient's wound and his hands with lye soap or whisky. He simultaneously became America's leading authority on gunshot wounds and was widely recognized for his skill as a surgeon.

On July 2, 1881, President James Garfield was shot by assassin Charles J. Guiteau. One bullet was thought later to have possibly lodged near his liver, but could not be found. Standard medical practice at the time called for physicians to insert their unsterilized fingers into the wound to probe and locate the path of the bullet. Neither the germ theory nor Dr. Joseph Lister's technique for "antisepsis surgery" using dilute carbolic acid, which had been first demonstrated in 1865, much less surgically opening abdominal cavities to repair gunshot wounds, had yet been accepted as standard practice by prevailing medical authorities. Sixteen doctors attended to Garfield and most probed the wound with their fingers or dirty instruments. Historians agree that massive infection was a significant factor in President Garfield's death two months later.

On July 4, two days after the President was shot, a miner outside Tombstone was shot in the abdomen with a .32-caliber Colt revolver. Goodfellow was able to treat the man nine days later, on July 13, 1881, when he performed the first laparotomy to treat a bullet wound. Goodfellow noted that the abdomen showed symptoms of a serious infection, including distension from gas, tumefaction, redness and tenderness. The man's intestines were covered with a large amount of "purulent stinking lymph." The patient's small and large intestine were perforated by six holes, wounds very similar to President Garfield's injury. Goodfellow followed Lister's recommended procedure for sterilizing everything: his hands, instruments, sponges, and the area around the wound. He successfully repaired the miner's wounds and the miner, unlike the President, survived. A laparotomy is still the standard procedure for treating abdominal gunshot wounds today.

Goodfellow often traveled many hours to treat cowboys miles from Tombstone and performed surgery under primitive conditions. He traveled to Bisbee, 30 miles (48 km) from Tombstone, in January 1889 to treat a patient struck in the abdomen by a bullet from a .44 Colt. At midnight, he operated on the patient stretched out on a billiards table. Goodfellow removed a .45-caliber bullet, washed out the cavity with two gallons of hot water, folded the intestines back into position, stitched the wound closed with silk thread, and ordered the patient to take to a hard bed for recovery. He wrote about the operation: "I was entirely alone having no skilled assistant of any sort, therefore was compelled to depend for aid upon willing friends who were present—these consisting mostly of hard-handed miners just from their work on account of the fight. The anesthetic was administered by a barber, lamps held, hot water brought and other assistance rendered by others." The man lived for 18 hours after surgery, long enough to write out his will, but died of shock.

=== Thesis on abdominal wounds ===
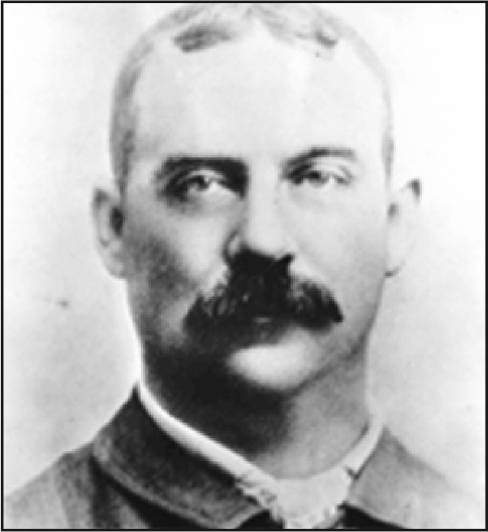
Goodfellow circa 1885

Goodfellow was the first physician known to operate successfully on abdominal gunshot wounds, which had been previously considered an all-but-certain death sentence. During his career, he published 13 articles about abdominal bullet wounds based on treatments and techniques he developed while practicing medicine in Tombstone.

His articles were laced with colorful commentary describing his medical practice in the early west. He wrote, "In the spring of 1881 I was a few feet distant from a couple of individuals [Luke Short and Charlie Storms] who were quarreling. They began shooting. The first shot took effect, as was afterward ascertained, in the left breast of one of them, who, after being shot, and while staggering back some 12 feet, cocked and fired his pistol twice, his second shot going into the air, for by that time he was on his back."

He included a description of the bullet wounds he most often treated: "The .44 and .45 caliber Colt revolver, .45-60 and .44-40 Winchester rifles and carbines were the toys with which our festive or obstreperous citizens delight themselves." The .45-caliber Colt Peacemaker round contained 40 grains of black powder that shot a thumb-sized, 250-grain slug at the relatively slow velocity of 910 feet per second. But the large bullet could smash through a 3.75-inch-thick (9.5 cm) pine board at 50 yards (46 m). Goodfellow saw the effect of these large-caliber weapons up close and was very familiar with their powerful impact. In an article titled "Cases of Gunshot Wound of the Abdomen Treated by Operation" in the Southern California Practitioner of 1889 he wrote, "the maxim is, shoot for the guts; knowing death is certain, yet sufficiently lingering and agonizing to afford a plenary sense of gratification to the victor in the contest." His article described five patients with penetrating abdominal wounds, four of whom survived, and the laparotomies he completed on all of them. He wrote, "it is inexcusable and criminal to neglect to operate upon a case of gunshot wound in the abdominal cavity."

Goodfellow learned that the caliber of the bullet determined whether a medical procedure was needed. If the bullet was .32-caliber or larger, it "inflicted enough damage to necessitate immediate operation." He noted, "Given a gunshot wound of the abdominal cavity with one of the above caliber balls [.44 and .45], if the cavity be not opened within an hour, the patient by reason of hemorrhage is beyond any chance of recovery." W.W. Whitmore wrote in an October 9, 1932, article in the Arizona Daily Star that Goodfellow "presumably had a greater practice in gunshot wounds of the abdomen than any other man in civil life in the country."

=== Conceived of bulletproof fabrics ===
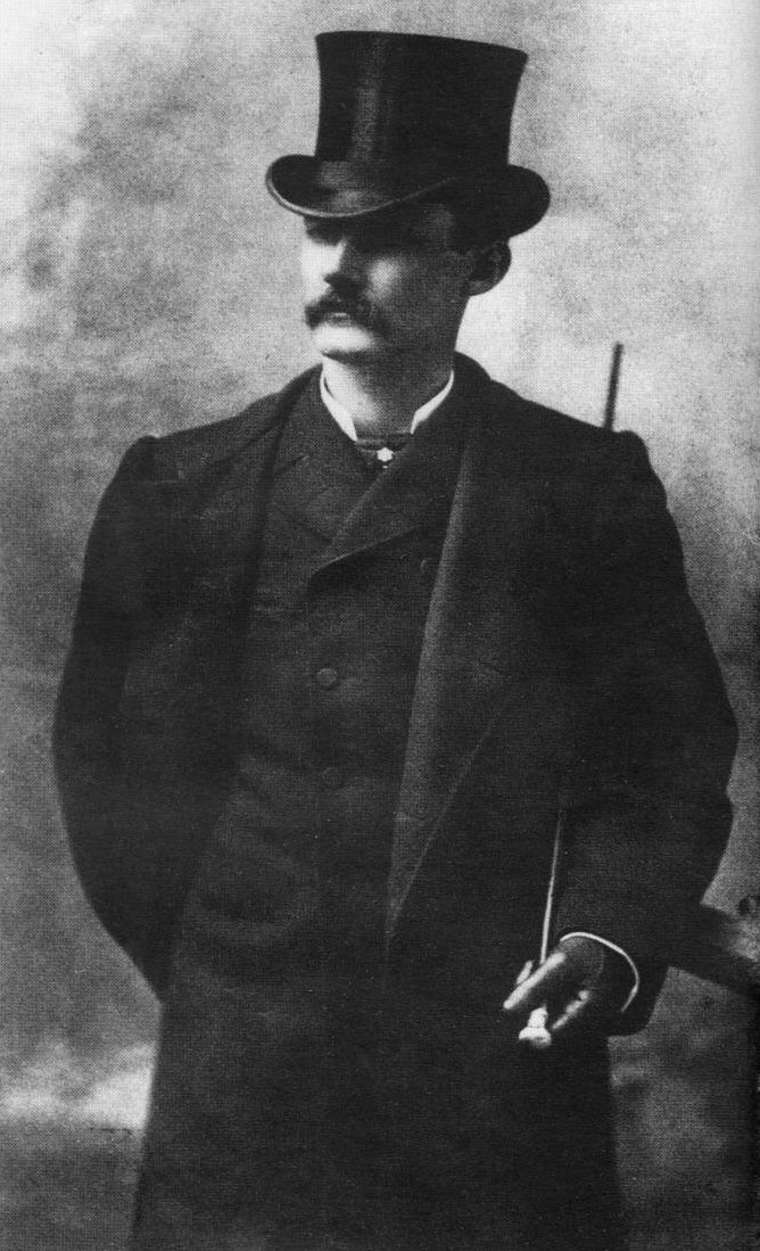
Faro dealer Luke Short shot Charlie Storms in the heart, but he did not bleed. Dr. Goodfellow later found a silk handkerchief had stopped the bullet.

On February 25, 1881, faro dealer Luke Short and professional gambler and gunfighter Charlie Storms got into an argument in Tombstone. Storms had successfully defended himself several times with his pistol, but had inaccurately sized Short up as someone he could "slap in the face without expecting a return." Bat Masterson initially defused a confrontation between the two men, but Storms returned, yanked Short off the sidewalk, and pulled his cut-off Colt .45 pistol. Luke Short was quicker and pulled his own pistol, shooting Charlie Storms twice before he hit the ground. The first shot was from such close range it reportedly set fire to Storms' shirt. Short's actions were ruled self-defense.

In an autopsy of Storms, Goodfellow found that he had been shot in the heart, but was surprised to see "not a drop of blood" exiting the wound, and noted that the bullet that struck Storms would ordinarily have passed through the body. He discovered that the bullet had ripped through the man's clothes and into a folded silk handkerchief in his breast pocket. He extracted the intact bullet from the wound and found two thicknesses of silk wrapped around it and two tears where it had struck the vertebral column. Goodfellow showed the slightly flattened .45-caliber bullet and bloody handkerchief to George Parsons.

Another case that attracted his attention was an incident when Assistant City Marshal Billy Breakenridge shot Billy Grounds from 30 feet (9.1 m) with a shotgun, killing him. Goodfellow examined Billy and found that two buckshot grains had penetrated Billy's thick Mexican felt hat band, which was embroidered with silver wire. These two buckshot and two others penetrated his head and flattened against the posterior wall of the skull, and others penetrated the face and chest. He also noted that one of the grains had passed through two heavy wool shirts and a blanket-lined canvas coat and vest before coming to rest deep in his chest. But Goodfellow was fascinated to find, in the folds of a Chinese silk handkerchief around Grounds' neck, two shotgun pellets but no holes. The Tombstone Epitaph reported, "A silken armor may be the next invention."

In a third instance, he described a man who had been shot through the right side of the neck, narrowly missing his carotid artery. A portion of the man's silk neckerchief had been carried into the wound by the bullet, preventing a more serious injury, but the scarf was undamaged. To Goodfellow, the remarkable protection offered by the silk was plainly evident from these examples, with the second case of the buckshot perhaps best illustrating the protection afforded by silk. In 1887, Goodfellow documented these cases in an article titled "Notes on the Impenetrability of Silk to Bullets" for the Southern California Practitioner. He experimented with designs for bullet-resistant clothing made of multiple layers of silk. By 1900, gangsters were wearing $800 silk vests to protect themselves. In 2018, the US military began conducting research into the feasibility of using artificial silk as body armor.

=== Other medical firsts ===
Goodfellow was an innovative physician who was forced to experiment with differing methods than those utilized by physicians in more civilized eastern practices. He pioneered the idea of treating tuberculosis patients by exposing them to Arizona's dry climate. Along with performing the first laparotomy, Goodfellow recorded several other surgical firsts, including performing the first appendectomy in the Arizona Territory. During 1891 at St. Mary's Hospital in Tucson, he performed what many consider to be the first perineal prostatectomy, an operation he developed to treat bladder problems by removing the enlarged prostate. He traveled extensively across the United States over the next decade, training other physicians to perform the procedure. Among these was Dr. Hugh Young, a well-known and respected urology professor at Johns Hopkins University. Goodfellow completed 78 operations and only two patients died, a remarkable level of success for the time period. He was among the first surgeons anywhere, let alone on the frontier of the United States, to implement the use of spinal anesthesia, which he improvised by crushing cocaine crystals in spinal fluid and re-injecting the mixture into the patient's spine.

== Other scientific pursuits ==
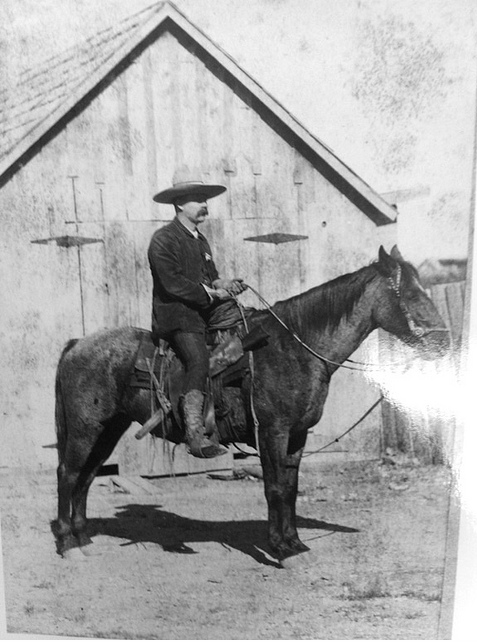
Goodfellow on El Rosillo, a gift from Mexican President Porfirio Díaz

In addition to his medical practice and related studies, Goodfellow had other scientific interests. He published articles about rattlesnake and Gila monster bites in the Scientific American and the Southern California Practitioner. He was among the first to research the actual effects of Gila monster venom when the lizard was widely feared for its deadly bite. The Scientific American reported in 1890 that "The breath is very fetid, and its odor can be detected at some little distance from the lizard. It is supposed that this is one way in which the monster catches the insects and small animals which form a part of its food supply—the foul gas overcoming them." Goodfellow offered to pay local residents $5.00 for gila monster specimens. He bought several and collected more on his own. In 1891, he purposefully provoked one of his captive lizards into biting him on his finger. The bite made him ill and he spent the next five days in bed, but he completely recovered. When Scientific American ran another ill-founded report on the lizard's ability to kill people, he wrote in reply and described his own studies and personal experience. He wrote that he knew several people who had been bitten by Gila monsters but had not died from the bite, suggesting that the bite was not necessarily fatal, as was commonly believed at the time.

=== 1887 Sonora earthquake ===
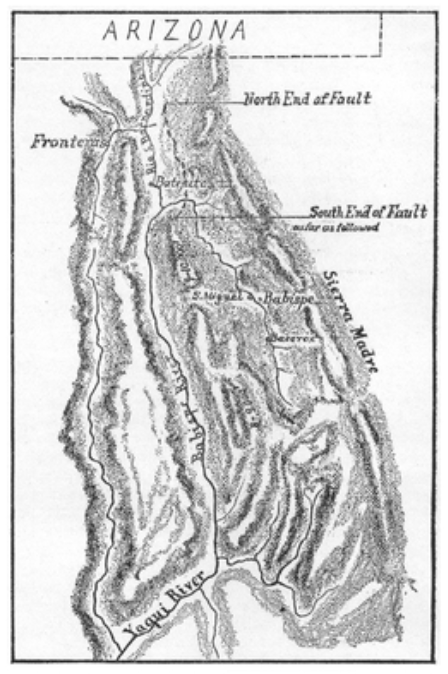
Sketch by Dr. George Goodfellow of the 1887 Sonora earthquake fault zone based on several weeks of field study. The Arizona–Sonora border is shown at top.

When the Bavispe earthquake struck the Mexican state of Sonora on May 3, 1887, it destroyed most of the adobe houses in Bavispe and killed 42 of the town's 700 residents. Goodfellow spoke excellent Spanish and he loaded his wagon with medical supplies and rode 90 miles (140 km) to aid survivors. The townspeople named him El Doctor Santo ("The Sainted Doctor"), and in recognition of his humanitarian contributions, Mexican President Porfirio Díaz presented him with a silver medal that had belonged to Emperor Maximilian and a horse named El Rosillo.

Goodfellow was fascinated by the earthquake and began a personal study of its effects. He noted that it was very difficult to pin down the time of the earthquake due to the absence of timepieces or a nearby railroad and the primitive living standards of the area's residents. Goodfellow returned twice more, the second time in July with Tombstone photographer C.S. Fly, to study and record the effects of the earthquake. He traveled over 700 miles (1,100 km) through the Sierra Madre mountains recording his observations, mostly on foot. The United States Geological Service praised his "remarkable and creditable" report, describing it as "systematic, conscientious, and thorough".

On August 12, 1887, he wrote a letter following up on his initial report in the top U.S. scientific journal, Science. It included the first surface rupture map of an earthquake in North America and photographs of the rupture scarp by C.S. Fly. The earthquake was at the time the "longest recorded normal-fault surface rupture in historic time." It was later described as an "outstanding study" and a "pioneering achievement". Goodfellow simultaneously developed a friendship with Mexican politician Ramón Corral and hosted him in 1904 when he visited San Francisco.

== Personal reputation ==
Along with being an extremely talented and innovative surgeon Goodfellow developed a reputation as a hard-drinking, irascible Ladies' man. He kept company with some of the courtesans who frequented the Crystal Palace Saloon. He was also known to be a vocal supporter of the Earps, town business owners, and miners, but that did not keep the rural Cowboys from seeking his services during the 11 years his office was located in Tombstone. He delivered babies, set miners' broken bones, treated gunshot wounds to cowboys and lawmen alike, and provided medical care to anyone in need. Tombstone had a large number of silver mines during its peak production period, and Goodfellow entered smoke-filled mining shafts on more than one occasion to help treat trapped and injured miners. The Tombstone Epitaph said Goodfellow had "both skill and nerve, both of which were brought into requisition on Contention Hill" when he personally rescued unconscious miners in late May 1886.

While Goodfellow lived in Tombstone, he was a founder in 1880 of the plush Tombstone Club located on the second floor of the Ritchie Building. The rooms were furnished with reading tables and chairs. The 60 male members had access to more than 70 publications. Goodfellow also helped organize the Tombstone Scientific Society. He was active in other community affairs, and invested in the Huachuca Water Company, which in 1881 built a 23-mile-long (37 km) pipeline from the Huachuca Mountains to Tombstone, along with a community swimming pool.

During the Tombstone fire in June 1881, George W. Parsons was helping to tear down a balcony to prevent the fire from spreading when he was struck by the falling wood. Parsons' upper lip and nose were pierced by a splinter of wood, severely flattening and deforming his nose. Goodfellow devised a wire framework and in a series of treatments successfully restored Parsons' nose to his pre-injury profile. He refused payment because Parsons had been hurt as he was assisting others.

In August 1889, he got into a fight while drunk during which he stabbed Frank White with a triple-edged, 4 inches (100 mm) poignard. White was seriously injured but Goodfellow was not arrested, as the judge ruled Goodfellow had acted in self-defense.

== Later life ==
In 1884, Goodfellow's father was a mining engineer in nearby Fairbank, Arizona, on the railroad line from Tucson to Nogales. His father died in 1887 in San Diego. In 1886, Goodfellow reportedly rode with the U.S. Army while they were attempting to recapture Geronimo after he left the San Carlos Reservation against Army orders. During his escape, he and his warriors killed "fourteen Americans dead in the United States and between 500 and 600 Mexicans dead south of the border." After Geronimo was apprehended, Goodfellow, who spoke fluent Spanish and some Apache, befriended Geronimo.

=== Move to Tucson ===
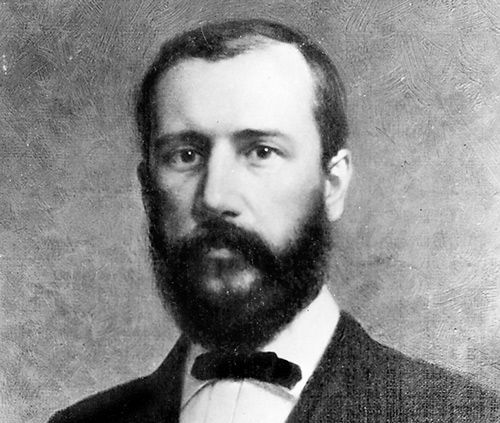
When Dr. John C. Handy assaulted his estranged wife's attorney, he was shot in the lower abdomen, and Goodfellow unsuccessfully tried to repair 18 perforations of his intestines

By 1890, Tombstone was on the decline. The price of silver had fallen, many of its silver mines had been permanently flooded, and a number of residents had left town. Goodfellow's wife fell ill and died in Oakland, California, at her mother-in-law's home in August 1891. Goodfellow and their daughter Edith attended her funeral at his mother's home in Oakland on August 16.

At noon on September 24, 1891, Goodfellow's friend and colleague, Dr. John C. Handy, was shot on the streets of Tucson. Handy had divorced his wife and had recently been trying to evict her from the home the court had granted her. When she hired attorney Francis J. Heney, Handy repeatedly threatened to kill him. He assaulted the attorney on the street that afternoon and Heney shot him in self-defense. Hearing the news, Goodfellow rode 24 miles (39 km) by horseback to Benson, Arizona, where he caught a locomotive and caboose, set aside just for him, to Tucson. In an effort to save Handy, he apparently took over the engine from the engineer and drove the train at high speed, covering the 46 miles (74 km) in record time. Handy had been attended by Drs. Michael Spencer, John Trail Green, and Hiram W. Fenner until Goodfellow arrived in Tucson at 8:15 pm. He began operating on Handy at about 10:00 pm. He found 18 perforations in Handy's intestines, which he immediately set about cleaning and closing. Goodfellow was too late, however, and Handy died at 1:15 am, before Goodfellow could complete the surgery.

After Handy's death, Dr. Goodfellow was invited to take over his Tucson practice, and he and his daughter Edith relocated there. He purchased the old Orndorff Hotel located near present-day City Hall and used it as a hospital. He also practiced at St. Mary's Hospital. In 1891, he operated on the chief surgeon of the Southern Pacific Railroad, who, like Handy, had been shot by his estranged wife's attorney. The surgeon died, and Goodfellow soon after accepted the railroad job, serving from 1891 to 1896. He was appointed by Governor Louis C. Hughes in 1893 as the Arizona Territorial Health Officer, a position he held until 1896. He was living in Los Angeles in 1896 and was listed in the 1897 Los Angeles City Directory.

=== Further military service ===
Goodfellow returned to Tucson in 1898 and later that year he became the personal physician to his friend General William "Pecos Bill" Shafter during the Spanish–American War. Appointed as a major, he was in charge of the general's field hospital.

Shafter relied on Goodfellow's excellent knowledge of the Spanish language to help negotiate the final surrender after the Battle of San Juan Hill. Goodfellow attributed part of his success to a bottle of "ol' barleycorn" he kept handy in his medical kit, which he properly prescribed to himself and Spanish General José Toral, lending a more convivial atmosphere to the conference. Goodfellow was recognized with a commendation for his service that cited his "especially meritorious services professional and military".

=== Practice in San Francisco ===
In late 1899, Goodfellow moved to San Francisco and established his practice at 771 Sutter St. On January 19, 1900, he was appointed as the surgeon for the Santa Fe Railroad headquartered in San Francisco. He was an active member of the Bohemian Club and attended their summer camp on the Russian River regularly. On February 15, 1900, Wells Fargo Express Agent Jeff Milton, a friend of Goodfellow, arrived on board a train in Fairbank, near Benson, Arizona. Former lawman-turned-outlaw Burt Alvord and five other robbers attempted to rob an arriving train of its cash. Milton was seriously wounded in the left arm and the railroad dispatched a special engine and boxcar to transport Milton from Benson to Tucson for treatment. In Tucson, Dr. H.W. Fenner tied the shattered bone together with piano wire. When the wound failed to heal, he sent Milton to San Francisco, where he could be seen by experts at the Southern Pacific Hospital there. They wanted to amputate his arm at the elbow, but he refused and got a ride to Dr. Goodfellow's office. Goodfellow successfully cleaned and treated Milton's wound but told him he would never be able to use the arm again. Milton's arm healed but was of little use and noticeably shorter than his right arm.

In April 1906, at the time of the 1906 San Francisco earthquake, Goodfellow had remarried and was living at the St. Francis Hotel. He lost all of his records and personal manuscripts in the hotel and his office due to the earthquake and subsequent fires. His finances were ruined and Goodfellow returned to the Southern Pacific Railroad, where he was chief surgeon in Guaymas, Mexico, from 1907 to 1910.

=== Death ===
Goodfellow fell ill in the summer of 1910 with an illness which he had reportedly been exposed to during the Spanish–American War. He sought treatment from his sister Mary's husband, Dr. Charles W. Fish, in Los Angeles. Over the next six months his health gradually declined, and soon a nervous disorder prevented him from performing surgery. He was hospitalized for several weeks at the end of 1910 at Angelus Hospital in Los Angeles.

Goodfellow declared he did not want to live any longer and on December 7, 1910, he died. His brother-in-law gave his cause of death as "multiple neuritis". His obituary attributed his death to a nervous breakdown. However, a local urologist and others thought alcoholism may have played a role in his death. Goodfellow was buried in the Angelus-Rosedale Cemetery in Los Angeles.

== Legacy ==
Goodfellow is credited as the United States' first civilian trauma surgeon. His pioneering work in the treatment of abdominal wounds, specifically those caused by gunshots, as well as his recognition of the significance of sterile technique at a time when much of the medical establishment had not yet accepted it as a surgical necessity, has contributed to his modern image as a physician well ahead of his time. Decades after his death, by the late 1950s, mandatory laparotomy had become and remains the standard of care for managing patients with abdominal penetrating trauma. To recognize financial supporters, the University of Arizona School of Medicine established the George E. Goodfellow Society.
