= Bavispe =

Village in Sonora, Mexico

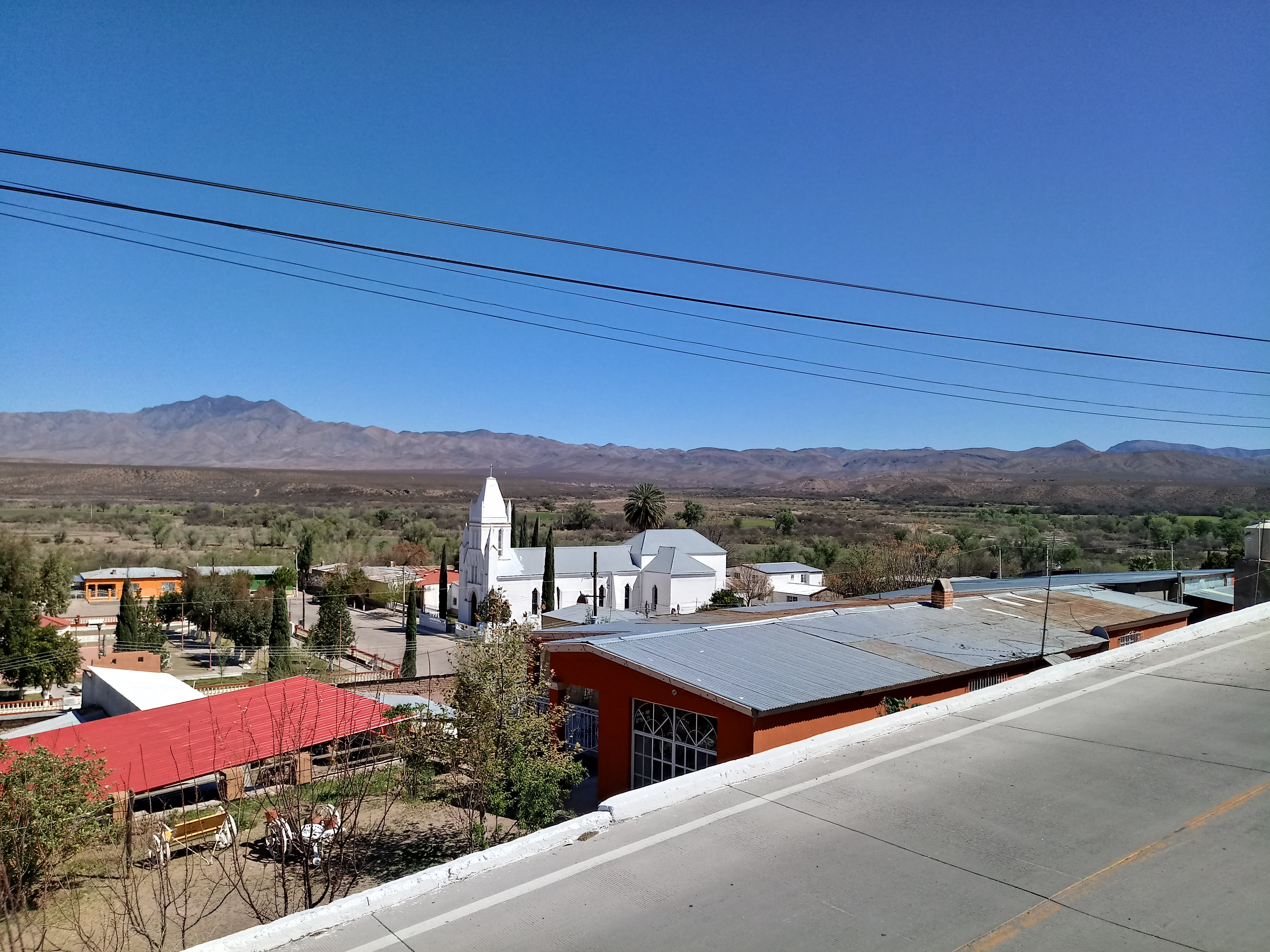
Bavispe village

Bavispe is a small town and a municipality in the northeast part of the Mexican state of Sonora.

== Geography ==
=== Location ===
The municipality is located in the northeast of the state at 30°28′N 108°56′W. The elevation of the administrative seat is 902 meters above sea level. It has boundaries with the following municipalities: in the north with Agua Prieta, in the south with Bacerac, in the west with Nacozari and in the east with the state of Chihuahua.

=== Area ===
The area of the municipality is 2,475.82 km^{2}., which makes up 1.34% of the state total.

=== Climate ===
Most of the area is mountainous, since it lies on the west side of the Sierra Madre Occidental. Due to the elevation the average annual temperature is 20.8°C.

=== Rivers ===
The only river of any importance is the Rio Bavispe, which begins in Chihuahua and crosses the region from north to south.

== Population ==
The municipal population in 2020 was 1,169, a drop from the 1,377 recorded in 2000. The municipal seat had a population of 674 in 2020.

== Etymology ==
The land now occupied by the municipality was once inhabited by the Opata tribe, from which came the name. Bavispe is derived from the word "Bavipa", which means "place where the river changes direction".

== History ==
Bavispe was founded in 1645, by the Jesuit missionary Cristóbal García and called San Miguel de Bavispe. In 1779, a Spanish presidio was formed at the location, manned entirely by Opatas ("Compañía de Opatas de Bavispe").

On May 2, 1887, a strong earthquake, felt as far north as Central Arizona, reduced the church of San Miguel de Bavispe to a crumbled wreck and left every home in the village uninhabitable. A new modern church was built on the same site. It acquired municipal status in 1931.

== Economy ==
The population is highly dependent on agriculture and cattle raising. Grasses are grown as cattle fodder. Beans and corn are also grown for subsistence. The cattle herd is sizable with over 11,000 head counted in 2000.

== Attractions ==
Part of Los Ajos-Bavispe National Forest Reserve is adjacent. This is one of Mexico's oldest protected areas, created almost 70 years ago. The reserve was created to preserve eight mountain tops, or "sky islands," and to protect the watersheds of three important Sonoran rivers: the Rio Sonora, the Bavispe River (which is a tributary to the Yaqui River), and the San Pedro River.

== Sources consulted ==
- Enciclopedia de los Municipios de Mexico
- INEGI National Institute of Statistic
