= John Horton Slaughter =

American soldier, lawman, cowboy, rancher, and gambler (1841–1922)

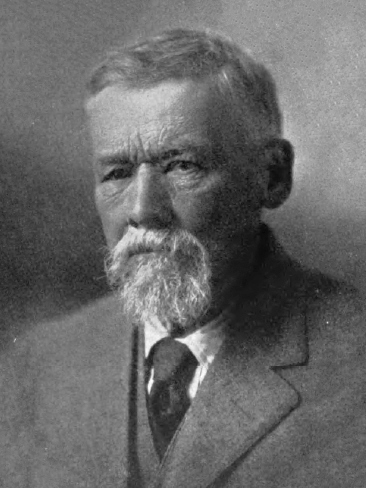
- Born: John Horton Slaughter; October 2, 1841; Sabine Parish, Louisiana, United States
- Died: February 16, 1922 (aged 80); Douglas, Arizona, US
- Spouse(s): Eliza Adeline Harris Slaughter (m. 1871; died 1877) Cora Viola Howell Slaughter (m. 1879)
- Relatives: From first marriage: Addie Slaughter; Willie Slaughter; Adopted in second marriage: Apache May Slaughter
- Military career
- Nickname: Texas John Slaughter
- Conflicts: American Civil War; American Indian Wars Comanche Wars; Apache Wars: Apache Campaign
- Other work: Texas Ranger, rancher, sheriff, United States Marshal

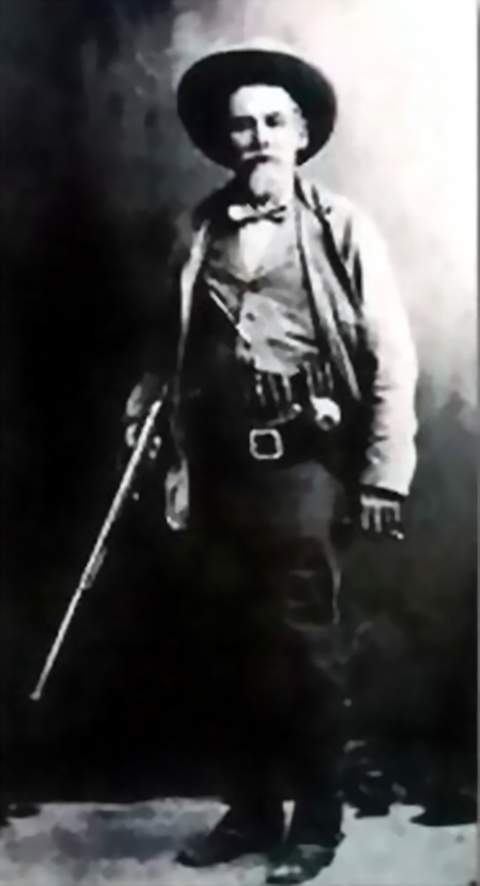
John Horton Slaughter with his shotgun

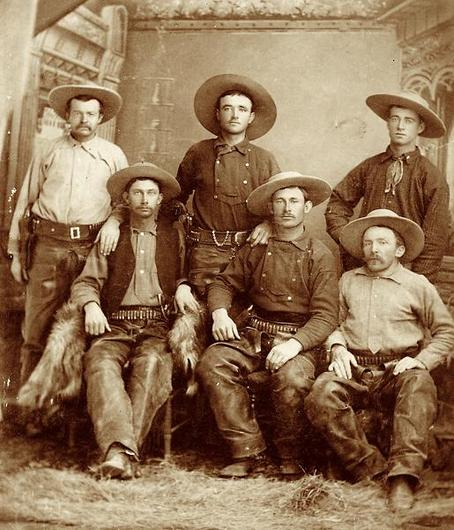
Incorrectly identified as "Terry's Texas Rangers" in fact these were cowboys of John H. Slaughter

John Horton Slaughter (October 2, 1841 – February 16, 1922), also known as Texas John Slaughter, was an American lawman, cowboy, poker player, and rancher in the Southwestern United States during the late 19th and early 20th centuries. After serving in the Confederate States Army during the American Civil War, Slaughter earned a reputation fighting hostile Indians and Mexican and American outlaws in the Arizona and New Mexico territories. In the latter half of his life, he lived at the San Bernardino Ranch, which is today a well-preserved National Historic Landmark in Cochise County in far southeastern Arizona. In 1964, he was inducted into the Hall of Great Westerners of the National Cowboy & Western Heritage Museum.

== Biography ==
=== Early life ===
Slaughter was born in 1841 on a Southern horse plantation in Sabine Parish near Many in western Louisiana. His parents were Benjamin Slaughter and the former Minerva Mabry. He was educated in schools in Texas in Sabine County and Caldwell County. From Mexican vaqueros, he learned how to herd cattle and speak Spanish.

In the early 1860s, Slaughter defended American settlers against hostile Comanche as a Texas Ranger. During the Civil War, he served in the Confederate States Army. He fought Union forces in Burnet County, west of the capital city of Austin, Texas.

=== Career ===
In 1874, his brother and he became cattle drivers in Atascosa County, south of San Antonio. The two formed a cattle-transporting company, the San Antonio Ranch Company, which drove cattle to Kansas via the Chisholm Trail. One (if not the only) of his cattle drive bosses was his first cousin, Lewis Warren Neatherlin. Neatherlin's brother, James Franklin Neatherlin, also the Slaughter brothers' first cousin, assisted on the drive.

In the late 1870s, Slaughter left Texas for New Mexico, where he traded cattle and planned to start a ranch. He eventually decided to establish the ranch, though, in the Arizona Territory. Initially settling in Charleston, Arizona, he later purchased the San Bernardino Ranch, on the U.S.–Mexico border near Douglas, in 1884.

In 1886, Slaughter was elected sheriff of Cochise County, Arizona, five years after the infamous Gunfight at the O.K. Corral. He was later re-elected to a second term. As sheriff, he helped track Geronimo, the Apache chief who was caught on the San Bernardino Ranch. Slaughter fought for law and order with his six-shooter, a shotgun, and a repeating Henry rifle. He arrested desperados such as the Jack Taylor gang and brought them to justice.

He also became a prominent poker player, often playing all night long. He was reportedly good at bluffing. He often played with the cattle baron John Chisum. Once, in San Antonio, he was cheated by cattle rustler Bryan Gallagher. Slaughter claimed the pot, but Bryan fled. Slaughter tracked down Gallagher all the way to New Mexico at Chisum's ranch and shot him down.

=== Personal life ===
Slaughter married Eliza Adeline Harris on August 4, 1871. Of their four children, only two, Addie and Willie, survived until adulthood. Eliza died in 1877 of smallpox in Tucson.

On April 16, 1879, Slaughter, at the age of 37, married 18-year-old Cora Viola Howell at Tularosa, New Mexico Territory. The Slaughters had no children of their own, but they adopted several children, including Apache May, whom Slaughter encountered in 1896 while chasing the Apache Kid in Mexico.

Years later, when he became ill, the Slaughters moved to an apartment on 12th Street in Douglas, Arizona.

Previously believed to be Slaughter's former slave, John Swain (Slaughter), an experienced cowboy, settled in Tombstone and became one of its oldest and longstanding residents, dying at the age of nearly 100 in 1945. However, John Slaughter hired Swain on as an employee in Texas in 1879 prior to moving to Arizona. Swain was employed by Slaughter for a brief period before leaving the San Bernardino ranch and moving to Tombstone, where he remained until his death. John Horton Slaughter never owned a slave.

=== Death ===
Slaughter was found on the morning of February 16, 1922, in his Douglas apartment, having died sometime during the previous night. He was buried at the Calvary Cemetery in Douglas.

== See also ==
- Texas John Slaughter, 1958–1961 TV series

Police appointments
Preceded by Robert S. Hatch	Sheriff of Cochise County, Arizona; 1887–1890	Succeeded by Carlton B. Kelton
