= Arizona Historical Society =

Non-profit organization

- AHS Logo (alchemist's symbol for copper)
- Founded: November 7, 1884; 141 years ago
- Founder: Arizona Territorial Legislature
- Type: non-profit
- Executive Director: Dr. David Breeckner
- President of the Board: Kelly Corsette
- Website: arizonahistoricalsociety.org

The Arizona Historical Society (AHS) is a non-profit organization whose mission is to connect people through the power of Arizona's history. It does this through four regional divisions. Each division has a representative museum. The statewide divisions are as follows: Southern Arizona Division in Tucson, the Central Arizona Division in Tempe, and the Northern Arizona Division in Flagstaff. It was founded in 1884.

== History of the Historical Society ==
The group was founded as the Society of Arizona Pioneers on January 31, 1884, by physician John C. Handy, his father-in-law William Fisher Scott, and 58 other Tucson pioneers.

With a new railroad being built and change on its way to Tucson, Arizona, pioneers worried that their stories of battles with the desert heat and the Apaches would be lost forever. The society was founded to preserve these stories and provide charitable service work to the local community as a mutual aid society. Original Historical Society members were often prominent members of the community, and their tasks with the society included attending funerals and raising money to help out widows.

Over time, the Society evolved to provide storage for official state papers and collect the histories of many Arizona citizens. The society has faced several periods of financial difficulty, and difficulty storing their collections safely. Collections expanded beyond the capacity of facilities several times, until a large, block-long basement was created to store records and documents at the current Main Museum.

As of 2015, the Society maintained several museums in the state with the financial support of over 3000 members and dozens of volunteers.

== Museums ==
=== Flagstaff ===
- Arizona Historical Society Pioneer Museum – located in the historic Coconino County Hospital for the Indigent. Exhibits include local history, ranching, logging, transportation and pioneer life.

=== Tempe ===
- Arizona Heritage Center – Exhibits focus on the state's history in the 20th and 21st centuries, including World War II, the rise of desert cities, Arizona pop culture, sports, and the state's geology.

=== Tucson ===
- Arizona History Museum – The largest AHS museum in the state, the Arizona History Museum frequently rotates its exhibits on Arizona history. Permanent displays include southern Arizona history from Spanish colonial through territorial eras, mining and transportation.

== Library and archives ==
The Arizona Historical Society currently houses a large collection of published and unpublished historical documents in its library and archives division. The collections are divided among 4 locations in Arizona, with each location specializing in certain aspects of history. The society lists its collection specialties as follows:

"Tucson Collections Strengths: Territorial era, Southern Arizona and borderlands, business, genealogy, ranching, politics, mining, military, law, non-profit and grass roots organizations, ephemera, photographs, and maps.

Tempe Collections Strengths: 20th Century, Maricopa County and Central Arizona, oral histories, architectural drawings, TV news reels, aviation, banking, healthcare, business, non-profit organizations, arts and culture, photographs and photographic studios.

Flagstaff Collections Strengths: Territorial era to 1950s, Northern Arizona and Colorado Plateau, business, politics, law, lumber industry, railroads, genealogy, local organizations, Indian Pow Wow records, education, healthcare, maps, oral histories and photographs."

AHS libraries are staffed by knowledgeable librarians who can aid in professional research or answer general research questions at the research help desk.

== Quarterly journal ==
The historical society publishes the quarterly Journal of Arizona History (originally named Arizoniana). The journal is distributed to members and contains articles about Arizona history. Photo essays and reviews are included along with standard articles. The Historical Society additionally publishes books, a list of which can be found on their website.
