= John C. Handy =

American physician (1844–1891)

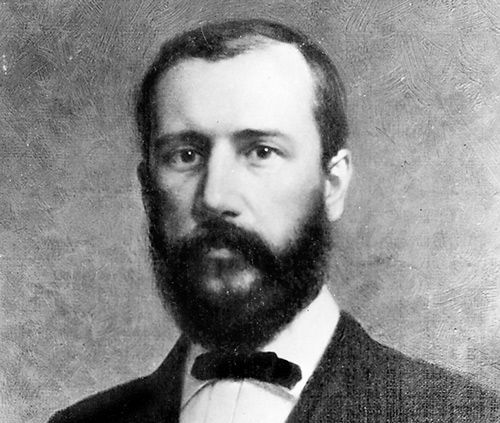
- Born: October 20, 1844; Newark, New Jersey
- Died: September 24, 1891 (aged 46); Tucson, Arizona Territory
- Cause of death: Killed in self-defense
- Occupation: Physician
- Known for: Founder, Society of Arizona Pioneers; Founder, Pima County Medical Society; Killed by wife's divorce attorney
- Spouse(s): unnamed Apache woman; Mary Page

John Charles Handy (October 20, 1844 – September 24, 1891) was a prominent physician who attacked his wife's divorce attorney and was killed. He practiced medicine from 1871 to 1891 in Tucson, Arizona Territory. He was first a contract surgeon for the U.S. Army at Camp Thomas and married an Apache woman. He became known for a fiery temper and during a disagreement with the post trader killed him, but was acquitted of all charges. Handy moved to Tucson in 1871 and remarried. He was selected in November 1886 as the first Chancellor of the University of Arizona and was a well-regarded physician. He founded the Pima County Medical Society in 1879 and helped set high standards for medical care. In 1884, he was among 58 Tucson pioneers who formed the Society of Arizona Pioneers.

He severely abused his wife Mary Page, chaining her to a bed in their home for days and may have administered morphine to her until she was addicted. Two years later he was having an affair with a married woman and filed for divorce, accusing her of being "a morphine fiend and a common slut." Handy publicly stated that any lawyer who defended her "would be sorry", and repeatedly threatened to kill her attorney Francis J. Heney.

After he won the divorce trial and custody of their children, who he sent to live with his mother, he tried to evict Mary Page from the home the court had awarded her. In September 1891, he attacked Heney on the streets of Tucson and the attorney shot him in what was ruled as self-defense. Handy's good friend Dr. George E. Goodfellow, a nationally recognized expert in gunshot wounds, traveled 70 miles (110 km) to operate on Handy but was unable to save him, and Handy died the next day.

Handy's son Jack was told by his paternal grandmother and aunt that Heney had attacked his father, but as an adult learned the truth from his maternal grandmother. Jack became friends with Heney and served as a pallbearer at his funeral.

== Personal life ==
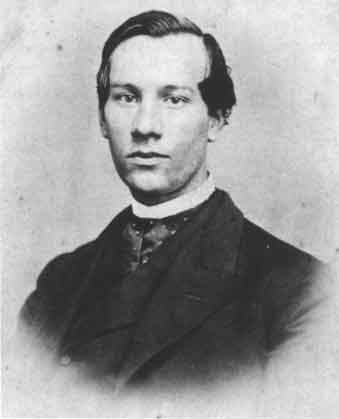
Dr. John Handy of Tucson, Arizona Territory.

Handy was born in on October 20, 1844 in Newark, New Jersey and moved with his parents to California in 1853. He graduated at age 19 from the Cooper College in San Francisco and received his medical diploma from Toland Medical School in 1865. He served as an Army contract surgeon in Arizona Territory at Fort Apache and Camp Thomas for two years.

He learned the Apache language, married an Apache woman, and became a military interpreter. He treated the Apaches' illnesses and wounds, gaining their confidence. In 1870 two Apache guided him through hostile territory to Tucson. At Camp Thomas he got into a disagreement with the post trader, Mr. Huey, who "applied to him a term for the use of which many a man on the frontier had been launched into eternity." Handy shot Huey who lived long enough to write a statement exonerating Handy, who called it a "matter of honor." Based on Huey's statement, Handy was not charged. There are no other records of his Apache wife.

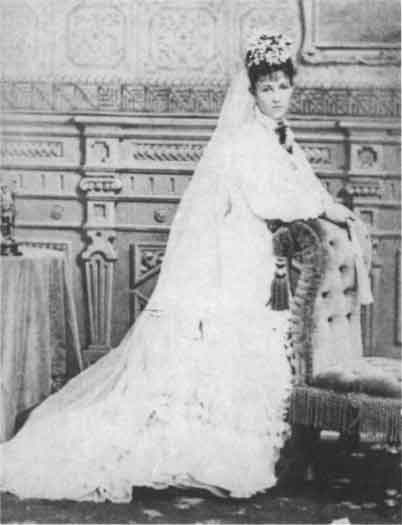
Mary Page Handy on her wedding day. Her mother, Larcena Pennington Page, survived an Apache attack and crawled 16 days to help.

On 17 July 1878 in Tucson, 34-year-old Handy married 16-year-old Mary Page Scott, (b. 14 September 1861). She was the daughter of Larcena Scott and William Fisher Scott. Her mother had earlier in life been kidnapped by the Apaches, wounded, and left for dead. Her mother gained fame after she crawled across the desert for 16 days and lived to tell the story. Her father was killed by Apache Indians before she was born.

John and Mary had five children: Charles (b. 1879), Mabel (b. 1880), William (b. 1881), John Handy Jr. ("Jack" b. July 17, 1882), and Spencer (b. 1888).

== Practice in Tucson ==
Handy ended his surgery contract with the Army and opened a practice in Tucson in August 1871 where he became the "foremost physician and surgeon". In 1873, he reached an agreement with the county board of supervisors to serve the indigent for the monthly salary of $45, and to furnish "board, washing, lodging, fuel, light, water, nurses, etc." for $55 for the first patient, and $50 for each additional patient. During a smallpox epidemic in Tucson during 1877, 24 people died, and he offered the vaccine free to anyone who could not afford it. He won the "high respect and utmost confidence of the people." He founded the Pima County Medical Society in 1879 and helped set high standards for medical care. He was the first attending physician when St. Mary's Hospital opened in 1880. Judge Richard E. Sloan described him as "the leading surgeon in Tucson, and in the Territory for that matter." Handy served on the committee that celebrated the arrival of the Southern Pacific Railroad from California in Tucson.

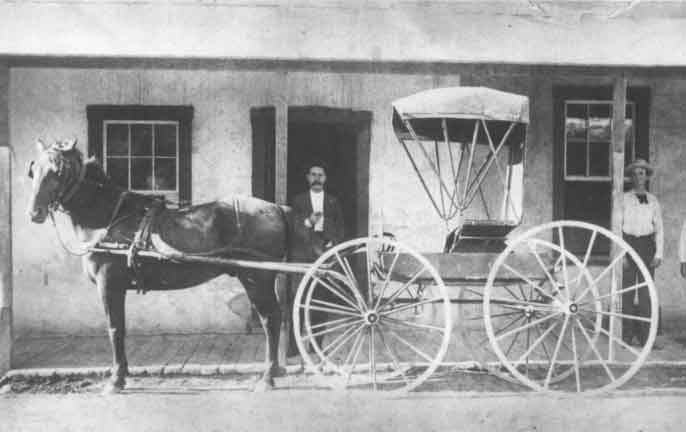
Dr. John C. Handy in front of his Tucson office.

On January 31, 1884, he and his father-in-law William Fisher Scott joined 58 other Tucson pioneers and formed the Society of Arizona Pioneers, and two years later he was elected president of the group. He also developed a reputation for his fiery, violent temper. In 1886 the regents of the University of Arizona appointed him as the first chancellor. He was very interested in helping plan the university's first building but soon got into arguments with the regents about its design. He refused to attend any more regent meetings and after only six months he was removed from his office.

== Abuse and divorce ==
Privately, his wife Mary complained to her neighbor, the wife of Ben Heney, that her husband abused her. In December 1888, pregnant once again, she filed for divorce. Rumors circulated that Handy had threatened to kill the judge and her lawyers and she withdrew her suit within the next month. Judge Sloan described Handy as "a man of strong will, aggressive, and both quarrelsome and vindictive."

Over the next four years she developed an addiction to morphine, possibly administered to her by her husband. Morphine at the time was readily available and prescribed for a variety of ailments. Handy sent their four children to live with his mother and sister in Oakland. By July 1898, Mary later testified that she was a virtual prisoner of her husband who chained her to a bedpost when he left home. She had a fifth child, Spencer, in 1888. Handy told her he had sent Spencer to Oakland as well and threatened to prevent her from ever seeing her children again unless she signed over her interest in their home to his mother as trustee for their children, which she did. The baby was actually still in Tucson.

In July 1889 Handy filed for divorce and six months later got the court's permission to place Spencer in hospital custody. The town gossip was that Handy wanted to marry another woman named Mrs. Pansy Smith that he had been seeing for some time. Due to her husband's continual threats, Mary had difficulty finding an attorney. When C.W. Wright agreed to represent her, he asked Francis J. Heney to assist him. Heney reluctantly agreed whereupon Wright promptly withdrew from the case. Heney refused to continue on his own, and Mary went from attorney to attorney seeking representation. Heney finally agreed to reconsider her pleas for help.

Handy relayed a message to Heney: "If Frank Heney takes the case I will kill him!" Handy publicly proclaimed that any attorney foolish enough to represent her in the divorce case "would be sorry." He described his wife as "a morphine fiend and a common slut." His attempts to intimidate Heney had the opposite effect, pricking Heney's conscience. Heney told his brother Ben, who lived across the street from Handy, that "If a lawyer can't take any case he feels it is right for him to handle, then he should take down his shingle." Heney and Handy had several confrontations. On more than one occasion, as the lawyer walked along the street, Handy intentionally attempted to run Heney over with his buggy. Handy called Heney a coward and a son of a bitch and tried to provoke a fight. Clerk of the Court Brewster Cameron, a friend of both Handy and Heney, warned Handy that his threats might negatively influence the court, and Handy desisted for a while.

The divorce trial dragged on for eight months, piling up a stack of legal documentation more than 5 inches (130 mm) high of complaints, countercharges, motions and depositions from prominent Tucson citizens. Despite witnesses supporting his wife's allegations of abuse, Handy prevailed and obtained custody of all five children. But the judge ordered Handy to pay her $30 a month in alimony, gave her the family home, and rejected Handy's demand for a new trial. Handy sent Spencer to live with his family in Oakland. In July 1891, Handy, acting in his mother's name, sued his ex-wife for unlawful detainer of property, trying to force her out of the house that the court had granted her. His suit was dismissed but he went to a second judge and presented the deed that his wife had signed under duress two years previously. Heney represented Mary again and Handy made more death threats. Fearful for his life, Heney began carrying a pistol. Heney's brother Ben lived across the street from Handy and began accompanying his brother to and from the office. Ben reported that Handy said he would "take Frank's gun away and kill him with it." Handy hired a former policeman named McCarthy as a bodyguard. On two occasions the four men confronted each other with their guns drawn.

== Shooting and death ==
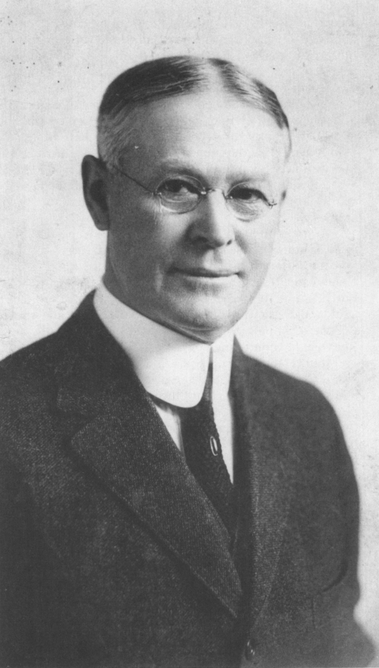
Francis J. Heney represented Handy's abused wife in their divorce trial and eviction proceeding despite repeated death threats from Handy. When Handy attacked him, Heney killed him in self-defense.

At noon on Thursday, September 24, 1891, Francis Heney's brother Ben, who had been helping guard Francis, was in San Francisco attending to family business. Francis Heney left his office for lunch. His secretary Lautaro Roca was to join him momentarily. Handy waited outside the courthouse, and a half-block away at Pennington St. and Church Ave., as Heney walked past Handy, Handy suddenly shouted and grabbed the smaller man from behind, whirled him around, seized Heney by the throat and pushed him against a wall, choking him with all his might. Handy then let go and hit Heney in the face, saying, "Take that you son of a bitch." Heney broke away and ran, pulling a pistol from his pocket. The noon-time crowd around the courthouse saw the fracas. Some shouted, "Don't shoot! Don't shoot!" Handy grabbed the pistol and tried to take the weapon from Heney. The two men struggled for control of it when it discharged, striking Handy in the lower abdomen. Handy, although wounded, lifted the smaller Heney off the ground and then both men fell to the street, still grappling for the revolver. But Heney refused to release his grip on the pistol while Handy still struggled for it. Deputy Sheriff John Wiegle and several other people finally removed the gun from Heney's grip and Handy's fingers from Heney's hands.

Handy was supported as he walked to his own office a block away where he inspected his own wound. The bullet had nearly penetrated his body. Doctors Michael Spencer and Hiram Fenner removed the bullet from near the base of his spine. Handy was then taken to his home. Handy insisted that his friend Dr. George E. Goodfellow in Tombstone, widely known for his expertise in treating gunshot wounds, be summoned to repair the internal damage. While Handy waited, he dictated a statement in which he accused Heney of attacking him, and he also dictated his will. Heney immediately surrendered at the court house and his bond was set at $6,000. Three friends immediately posted his bail. A hearing was set for Saturday.

After Goodfellow received a phone call with news of Handy's shooting, he rode 24 miles (39 km) by horseback to the nearest railhead in Benson, Arizona, where he boarded a railroad engine and caboose set aside just for him, and set out for Tucson. In an effort to get to Tucson faster, he took over the locomotive from the engineer and drove the train at high speed, and covered the 46 miles (74 km) in record time, arriving at 8:15 pm. Goodfellow began operating at about 10:00 pm, and he found 18 perforations in Handy's intestines, which he immediately set about cleaning and closing. But Goodfellow was too late and Handy died at 1:15 a.m., before Goodfellow could complete the surgery.

Two days after the shooting, Heney was represented by Selim M. Franklin at the inquest into Handy's death. Cameron, the court clerk, testified that Handy had repeatedly threatened to kill Heney. Witnesses testified that on more than one occasion, as the lawyer walked along the street, Handy had intentionally attempted to run Heney over with his buggy. Witnesses and Heney told the court that Handy had attacked Heney. Many prominent witnesses affirmed that Heney acted in self-defense. Although Handy had a revolver, he had not removed it from his pocket. The judge found that Heney had acted in self-defense and exonerated Heney from any charges.

Handy was honored with Masonic funeral rites in Tucson which were followed by a procession up Court Street including "a thousand Mexican women, wearing black rebozos" who had benefited from his services. His body was then transported by rail to Oakland, California, where he was buried in a family plot near his father.

== Aftermath ==
Handy named his sister Cornelia Holbrook of San Francisco to administer his estate, which he divided among his five children. His ex-wife Mary unsuccessfully contested the will, and Holbrook sold all of Handy's Arizona property, including his office, horses, buggies, medical books, instruments, and mining claims. Handy's mother Roseanne's name was on the deed that Handy had coerced Mary into signing over. After the divorce, Roseanne Handy dropped the lawsuit to evict Mary from the Handy home. A year later Mary got a judge to cancel the deed and she regained ownership of the home. Three months after Goodfellow vainly tried to save her husband, Goodfellow performed his first vaginal hysterectomy on Mary. Her continued health challenges turned out to be from cervical cancer. She recovered for about four months when the cancer returned. Longing to see her children before she died, she asked her former sister-in-law and mother-in-law to send the children to Tucson, but they refused. Mary died on January 28, 1893.

Her son John Handy Jr. (Jack) grew up in Oakland with his siblings at their paternal grandmother Roseanna Handel's home. The children were later sent to San Francisco to live with their aunt, Cornelia Holbrook. She told the children that their father had been murdered. She said that Heney had been the one who threatened and ambushed Handy, that he had been tried for murder and acquitted only because he was the sole witness.

Young Jack grew up hating Heney. Jack was unhappy in both homes and ran away in 1896 at age 14 and went to sea on a whaling ship. Jack returned to San Francisco in 1902 and at age 19 married Beatrix Walter. They went to Tucson, where they lived with his maternal grandmother Larcena Pennington Page for about two years. They returned to San Francisco, where Jack eventually became an executive for Standard Oil. In 1906, Heney became nationally known when he successfully prosecuted timber fraud in Oregon. He was persuaded to investigate the crooked political system in San Francisco. Abe Ruef, the primary target of his investigation, dug up Cornelia's story that Heney had ambushed Handy and got The Daily News of San Francisco to publish her story. Ruef tried to persuade Jack to file charges. Instead, Jack went to visit Heney and thanked him for the support Heney had offered his mother under difficult circumstances, the true story Jack had heard from his grandmother in Tucson. The two men became lifelong friends, and Jack was a pallbearer at Heney's funeral in 1937.
