= Texas John Slaughter (TV series) =

- Genre: Western
- Directed by: Harry Keller; James Neilson
- Starring: Tom Tryon
- Theme music composer: Joseph S. Dubin
- Opening theme: "Texas John Slaughter" by Stan Jones
- Country of origin: United States
- Original language: English
- No. of seasons: 3
- No. of episodes: 17

Original release
- Network: ABC
- Release: October 31, 1958 – April 23, 1961

Texas John Slaughter (formally titled: Tales of Texas John Slaughter) is a Western television series which aired 17 episodes between October 31, 1958, and April 23, 1961, as part of Walt Disney Presents, starring Tom Tryon in the title role. The character was based upon an actual historical figure, Texas Ranger John Horton Slaughter. Tryon memorably wore an enormous white cowboy hat with the brim pinned up in the front as part of his wardrobe for the series. Narration is provided by Paul Frees.

The beginning theme song for the series includes the line "Texas John Slaughter made 'em do what they oughter, and if they didn't, they died."

== Cast ==
- Tom Tryon as Texas John Slaughter
- Robert Middleton as Frank Davis
- Norma Moore as Adeline Harris
- Harry Carey, Jr. as Ben Jenkins
- Judson Pratt as Captain Cooper
- Robert J. Wilke as Jed (Outlaw #1)
- Edward Platt as Lease Harris
- Leo Gordon as Outlaw #2
- John Day as Private Jeff Clay
- John Alderson as Sgt. Duncan MacGregor
- Chris Alcaide as Outlaw #3
- Robert Hoy as Ranger #2
- Chuck Roberson as Ranger #1
- Lyle Bettger as Al Barko
- Beverly Garland as Mrs. Amanda Barko
- Christopher Dark as Reed
- Dan Haggerty as Outlaw #1
- Lane Bradford as Outlaw #2
- Dan Duryea as Dan Trask
- Ann Doran as Mrs. Chadwick
- Robert Foulk as Pitts
- Henry Willis as Brown
- Betty Lynn as Viola Slaughter
- Annette Gorman as Addie Slaughter
- Brian Corcoran as Willie Slaughter

== Episodes ==
=== Season 1: 1958–59 ===
No. overall	No. in season	Title	Directed by	Written by	Original release date
1	1	"Texas John Slaughter"	Harry Keller	Albert E. Lewin and Burt Styler	October 31, 1958
The series begins in 1870, as John Slaughter (Tom Tryon) rides into Fowlertown, a frontier settlement in Frio County, Texas and is ambushed by two men. During a gunfight, Slaughter kills both outlaws in self-defense, later learning that they were wanted for killing the sheriff. Ben Jenkins (Harry Carey, Jr.), a member of the Texas Rangerslaw enforcement organization, explains that the outlaws mistook Slaughter for a Ranger because of his white hat, similar to the Rangers' distinctive headgear. Declining an offer to join the Rangers, Slaughter initially buys a small herd of cattle to settle on a ranch near town. He later joins the organization after a run-in on his ranch with outlaw Frank Davis (Robert Middleton), whose gang murders his cowhand and rustles his entire herd. Davis later murders one of his own men to prevent him from implicating Davis in the incident, and Slaughter witnesses Davis fleeing the scene of the murder. When Davis is reported to be 100 miles away in Laredo nine hours later, Slaughter rides nonstop from Fowlertown to Laredo, switching horses Pony Express-style at various points, disproving Davis's alibi. Slaughter captures Davis in a gunfight to high commendation from the Rangers' Captain Cooper (Judson Pratt). Meanwhile, Slaughter's girlfriend, Addie Harris (Norma Morris), visits Fowlerton for a week. Scenes from the series' first two episodes ("Texas John Slaughter" and "Ambush in Laredo") were edited for a 1960 theatrical feature film released internationally as Texas John Slaughter.
2	2	"Ambush in Laredo"	Harry Keller	Frank D. Gilroy and Albert E. Lewin, Burt Styler	November 14, 1958
After John Slaughter captures Frank Davis, the Texas Rangers capture the remaining members of his gang. Davis is released from jail after posting a $20,000 bail and is free to travel throughout Texas until his trial. Captain Cooper directs Slaughter and Ben Jenkins to follow Davis and survey his activities. Davis and an associate (Jed, played by Robert J. Wilke) discover an injured boy on the road and return him home, threatening and robbing his family before leaving. Slaughter and Jenkins track Davis's path toward Pleasanton and the ranch house of Lease Harris (Edward Platt), Addie's father. Slaughter and Jenkins witness Harris warmly welcoming Davis and giving him a horse before he departs in the darkness. Slaughter is embarrassed that his future father-in-law is aiding the outlaw, so he confronts Harris, who claims that Davis is a childhood friend, known as Frank Dawson. The next day, Slaughter and Jenkins follow Davis as he journeys to Laredo. After arriving in town, Davis meets with a group of prominent outlaws who raised his $20,000 bail. They finalize plans to divide Texas between their rival gangs. Davis challenges the outlaws to kill Slaughter, the primary witness against him. With Slaughter eliminated, the case against Davis would be dropped, and the outlaws' bail money would be returned. Two of the outlaws ambush Slaughter while at a barber shop, but he kills both in a gunfight. The remaining outlaws refuse to pursue Slaughter further and depart. Davis attempts to slip quietly out of town early one morning, but shoots Jenkins as he flees. Slaughter pursues Davis on horseback and kills him in a gunfight. Injured in the shootout, Slaughter is ordered by the local marshal to rest for a month at the Harris ranch. Addie and her father arrive to escort Slaughter home. Scenes from the series' first two episodes ("Texas John Slaughter" and Ambush in Laredo) were edited for a 1960 theatrical feature film released internationally as Texas John Slaughter.
3	3	"Killers from Kansas"	Harry Keller	Frank D. Gilroy	January 9, 1959
John Slaughter and MacGregor (John Alderson) attempt to pick up payroll for the Texas Rangers but interrupt a bank robbery by the notorious Barko gang from Kansas. Amanda Barko (Beverly Garland) kills MacGregor in the confrontation, and Slaughter is beaten unconscious. Captain Cooper assigns Slaughter to light duty as he recovers, including the routine assignment of escorting the stagecoach from Fowlertown to Pleasanton, as it carries gold at the first of the month. Slaughter's fiance, Addie, is upset that Slaughter is leading a dangerous life, wanting him to give up his Ranger position and settle down on a ranch to raise a family together. Meanwhile, Al Barko (Lyle Bettger) and Amanda Barko meet with their gang to plan their next job. Al announces that the notorious outlaw Dan Trask has invited them to hole up on his ranch south of the US border, just past the reach of the Rangers. Amanda objects, wanting to do one more bank job to arrive at Trask's safe haven on more solid footing. The Barkos decide to rob the stagecoach to Pleasanton after discovering it's carrying over $30,000 in gold and believing that it will be unaccompanied by Rangers. Slaughter and Ben Jenkins surprise the gang and foil the robbery. With Al wounded and one of their members captured, the gang commandeers a nearby ranch in order to regroup. Slaughter interrogates the captured gang member and discovers the gang's plan to cross the border and join forces with Dan Trask. Meanwhile, Addie returns from town to her ranch and discovers it has been overrun by the Barkos. Slaughter visits Addie to discuss their quarrel over his dangerous job, only for Addie to turn him away. Slaughter is suspicious and notices Al Barko's horse in the corral. He convinces Captain Cooper to mount a raid on the ranch. Slaughter is captured by Amanda as he attempts to rescue Addie. In the ensuing scuffle, Addie shoots one of the outlaws and corners Amanda. With the gang captured, Slaughter and Addie relax, both hoping for a safe future married life on a ranch with a big family. Scenes from episodes three and four ("Killers from Kansas" and "Showdown at Sandoval") were edited for a 1961 theatrical feature film released internationally as Gunfight at Sandoval. The film was later released on VHS by Walt Disney Home Video.
4	4	"Showdown at Sandoval"	Harry Keller	Frank D. Gilroy and Maurice Tombragel	January 23, 1959
Despite repeated interrogations in jail, Amanda Barko has refused to explain why her gang wants to join forces with Dan Trask (Dan Duryea) in Mexico. Meanwhile, Trask and his gang cross the border into Texas to extort the Chadwick family for 20% of their ranch income. Slaughter and the Rangers give chase to the gang, but are unable to pursue them farther after the gang crosses the Rio Grande back into Mexico, where the Rangers have no jurisdiction. Later that night, Slaughter and his fiancée, Addie, fight after Slaughter asks to postpone their wedding again, this time to bring Trask to justice. Addie reluctantly gives him two weeks. She claims, though, that after that, the wedding is off. During an interrogation by Slaughter, Amanda Barko ponders how things would be different if she had met up with him instead of Al Barko, giving him an idea for a daring plan to capture Trask. Hypothesizing that Mexican-based Trask likely never met the Kansas-based Barko gang, Slaughter proposes to pose as Al Barko while several Rangers pose as members of the gang, giving them cover to cross into Mexico and dismantle Trask's operations. Captain Cooper cannot officially sanction the plan. He grants Slaughter and four Rangers temporary leaves of absence, indicating that what they do on their personal leave time is their own business. Cooper proposes that Addie pose as Amanda Barko, over Slaughter's objections. Posing as the Barko gang, Slaughter, Addie, and the Rangers cross into Mexico. Upon arriving at Trask's fortress-like hideout, known as Sandoval, Trask suspects nothing and welcomes the group. As is customary of residents of and visitors to Sandoval, Trask requires them to surrender their firearms. Trask runs a sophisticated operation, including furnished accommodations and a bank that also functions as an arsenal. One of Trask's men, Roy, believes he might recognize Slaughter but is unsure. After Trask openly flirts with Addie during an elegantly staged dinner, Slaughter becomes infuriated and challenges Trask to a duel the next morning. As the duel begins, Roy positively identifies Slaughter as an undercover Ranger. Slaughter quickly shoots Trask, while the masquerading Rangers rob Trask's bank, retrieving stolen money, as well as their confiscated firearms. After Trask's men retrieve their guns from the bank, they pursue Slaughter to the Rio Grande. Jenkins lights explosives along a trail, slowing down Trask's men. After heavy gunfire, both Slaughter and Trask's men cross the Rio Grande back into Texas, where the full force of the Rangers provide support. Back in town, Slaughter quits the Rangers. Captain Cooper allows Slaughter to keep his iconic white hat as the couple departs to prepare for their wedding in a week. Scenes from episodes three and four ("Killers from Kansas" and "Showdown at Sandoval") were edited for a 1961 theatrical feature film released internationally as Gunfight at Sandoval. The film was later released on VHS by Walt Disney Home Video.
5	5	"The Man from Bitter Creek"	Harry Keller	David P. Harmon	March 6, 1959
6	6	"The Slaughter Trail"	Harry Keller	David P. Harmon	March 20, 1959

=== Season 2: 1959–60 ===
No. overall	No. in season	Title	Directed by	Written by	Original release date
7	1	"The Robber Stallion"	Harry Keller	Fred Freiberger	December 4, 1959
8	2	"Wild Horse Revenge"	Harry Keller	Fred Freiberger	December 11, 1959
9	3	"Range War at Tombstone"	Harry Keller	David P. Harmon	December 18, 1959
10	4	"Desperado from Tombstone"	Harry Keller	story by Cyril Hume and Maurice Tombragel; teleplay by Maurice Tombragel	February 12, 1960
11	5	"Apache Friendship"	Harry Keller	story by Maurice Tombragel and Cyril Hume; teleplay by Maurice Tombragel	February 19, 1960
12	6	"Kentucky Gunslick"	Harry Keller	David P. Harmon	February 26, 1960
13	7	"Geronimo's Revenge"	Harry Keller	David P. Harmon	March 4, 1960

=== Season 3: 1961 ===
No. overall	No. in season	Title	Directed by	Written by	Original release date
14	1	"The End of the Trail"	James Neilson	teleplay by David P. Harmon	January 29, 1961
15	2	"A Holster Full of Law"	James Neilson	teleplay by Davd P. Harmon	February 5, 1961
16	3	"A Trip to Tucson"	James Neilson	teleplay by Maurice Tombragel	April 16, 1961
17	4	"Frank Clell's in Town"	James Neilson	teleplay by Maurice Tombragel	April 23, 1961

== Background ==
The pilot episode was expanded into a 74-minute feature film, also named after the titular Texas Ranger. It was released theatrically overseas in 1958 in color, though the TV version on ABC was broadcast in black and white. It featured Robert Middleton, Norma Moore, Robert J. Wilke, Edward Platt, and Harry Carey Jr.

== Release ==
The series was originally broadcast as segments of The Wonderful World of Disney.

The series appeared in reruns on the Disney Channel's classic program block Disney Drive-In, which was later known as Vault Disney.

== Merchandising ==
The TV show was also adapted into a comic book by Dan Spiegle, distributed by Dell Comics.
