= 1887 Sonora earthquake =

Earthquake in northwest Mexico

- Location within Mexico
- UTC time: 1887-05-03
- USGS-ANSS: ComCat
- Local date: 3 May 1887
- Magnitude: 7.6 M_{w}
- Epicenter: 31.07°N 109.12°W
- Fault: Pitaycachi Fault
- Type: Dip-slip
- Areas affected: Mexico; United States
- Max. intensity: MMI IX–XI
- Casualties: 51 dead

The 1887 Sonora earthquake occurred at 22:13 UTC on 3 May in the Teras mountain range of northwestern Mexico. It was widely felt, with some damage being recorded up to 200 kilometers (120 mi) from the epicenter in both Mexico and the United States. The earthquake had an estimated magnitude of 7.6 and caused 42 casualties in the town of Bavispe and 51 overall. It was the only historical earthquake to cause considerable damage in Arizona. The 1887 Tombstone Arizona newspapers mentioned lesser quakes (aftershocks) on August 27, 1887, and November 11, 1887.

== Tectonic setting ==
The earthquake was located near the southern end of the extensional Basin and Range Province. The western margin of the Sierra Madre Occidental plateau is formed by a series of west-dipping normal faults, over a distance of at least 300 kilometers (190 mi). The earthquake occurred within this zone.

== Damage ==
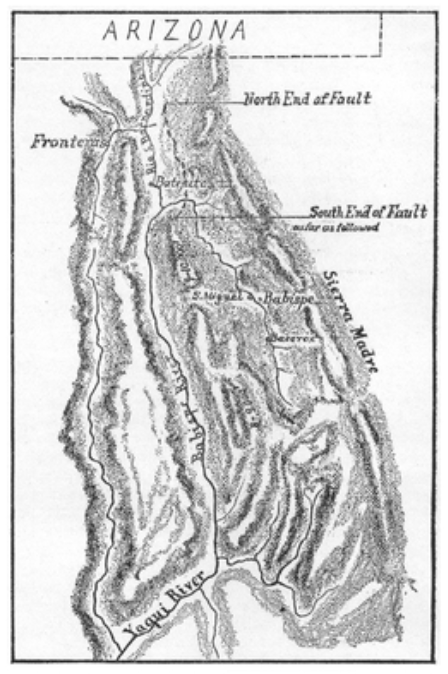
Sketch by Dr. George Goodfellow of the 1887 Sonora earthquake fault zone based on several weeks of field study. The U.S./Arizona border is shown at top.

Towns near the epicenter suffered significant damage, particularly in Bavispe, where most houses were destroyed and 42 of the town's 700 inhabitants were killed. Houses of adobe construction were also destroyed in Tepic and Moctezuma. The houses were roofed with heavy log rafters that were untied to the adobe walls and fell in when the walls collapsed. The earthquake triggered many rockfalls and landslides and caused ground fissures. Moderate to severe damage occurred in northeastern Sonora, northwestern Chihuahua, southwestern New Mexico, southeastern Arizona and the westernmost part of Texas. Eyewitness reports from Cochise County, Arizona claim that shaking caused the ground to open up, with liquefaction spreading across the plains. This information was later found to support up to XI intensity on the Modified Mercalli Scale.

== Characteristics ==
The earthquake was associated with a surface rupture consisting of three segments with a combined length of 101.8 km, the longest normal fault rupture recorded for an earthquake in historic times. The three faults that ruptured were the Pitáycachi, Teras, and Otates faults from north to south. The magnitude of the event has been estimated as 7.6 on the moment magnitude scale from an analysis of an isoseismal map drawn up for this event, following a re-evaluation of earlier estimates of felt intensity.

There was a prolonged sequence of aftershocks that are interpreted to continue to the present. Particularly large aftershocks (about magnitude 5) occurred on 26 May 1907, 17 May 1913 and 18 and 19 December 1923.

== Assistance and reporting ==
The earthquake destroyed most of the adobe houses in Bavispe and killed 42 of the town's 700 residents; Dr. George E. Goodfellow in Tombstone, Arizona Territory, loaded his wagon with medical supplies and rode 140 kilometers (87 mi) to aid survivors. The townspeople named him El Doctor Santo (The Holy Doctor), and in recognition of his humanitarian contributions, Mexican President Porfirio Diaz presented him with a silver medal that had belonged to Emperor Maximilian and a horse named El Rosillo. Goodfellow noted that it was very difficult to pin down the time of the earthquake due to the absence of time pieces or a nearby railroad, and the primitive living standards of the area's residents.

Goodfellow returned twice, the second time in July with Tombstone photographer Camillus Sidney Fly to study and record the effects of the earthquake. He covered over 700 miles (1,100 km) on horseback but mostly on foot through the Sierra Madre Oriental mountains recording his observations. His report included the first surface rupture map of an earthquake in North America and photographs of the rupture scarp by C.S. Fly. The United States Geological Service praised his "remarkable and creditable" report, describing it as "systematic, conscientious, and thorough." The earthquake was at the time the "longest recorded normal-fault surface rupture in historic time". His report was later described as an "outstanding study" and a "pioneering achievement".

== See also ==
- List of earthquakes in Mexico
- List of earthquakes in the United States
- List of historical earthquakes
