= Winlock W. Steiwer =

American politician

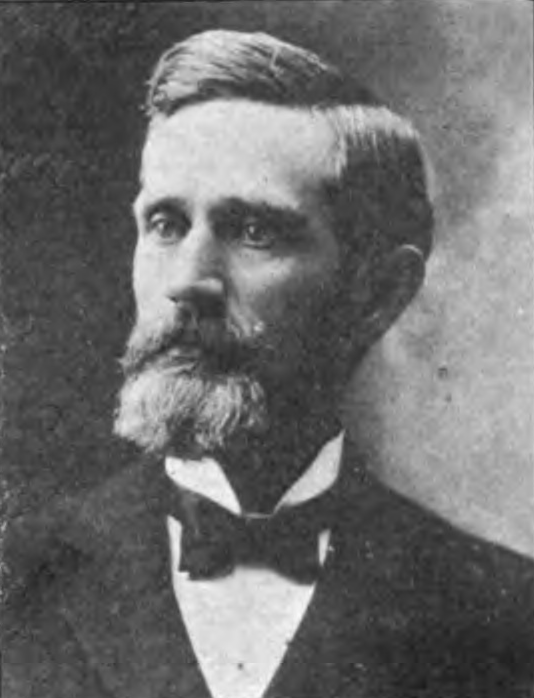
- Steiwer circa 1900

Member of the Oregon State Senate
- In office 1893–1896
- Constituency: Gilliam County; Wasco County; Sherman County

Member of the Oregon State Senate
- In office 1901–1904
- Constituency: Sherman County; Wasco County; Gilliam County; Grant County; Wheeler County

Personal details
- Born: August 7, 1852 Marion County, Oregon Territory
- Died: July 18, 1920 (aged 67) Portland, Oregon
- Party: Republican
- Spouse: Annie Jeriah Hoover
- Education: Willamette University

Winlock W. Steiwer (August 7, 1852 – July 18, 1920) was an American banker, rancher, and politician in the state of Oregon. Born in the Willamette Valley, he made his name in Eastern Oregon as the founder of a bank and as county judge. A Republican, he twice served in the Oregon State Senate. He pleaded guilty in the Oregon land fraud scandal of the early 1900s.

== Early life ==
Winlock Steiwer was born in Marion County, Oregon Territory, to Frederick and Susan Looney Steiwer on August 7, 1852. He was educated in the local schools there before he enrolled at Willamette University in Salem where he graduated in 1871. After briefly working as a teacher, he moved to Eastern Oregon.

In Eastern Oregon Steiwer became a rancher and a banker. He married Annie Jeriah Hoover on 14 July 1886, and they had five children together, including William Hoover Steiwer who would serve as President of the Oregon Senate. After accumulating a fortune in the cattle business, he sold out and moved to Fossil, Oregon. He established the first bank in Wheeler County in 1912 with George S. Carpenter in Fossil. Steiwer also owned and operated a mercantile in Fossil until 1910. That year he moved to Portland, Oregon, but he retained his interest in the bank he helped found.

== Political career ==
In 1886 Steiwer became the judge for Gilliam County, serving until 1890. In 1892 he was elected to the Oregon State Senate to represent Gilliam, Wasco, and Sherman counties. A member of the Republican Party, he served during both the 1893 and 1895 legislative sessions in Salem. In 1901 he returned to the Senate after winning a new four-year term. After reapportionment, he represented District 21, which comprised Sherman, Wasco, Gilliam, Grant, and Wheeler counties, in the 1903 legislature.

=== Land fraud scandal ===
In 1905 Steiwer was indicted for his role in the Oregon land fraud scandal along with John Hicklin Hall and Binger Hermann among others. Steiwer had served as president of the Butte Creek Land, Livestock and Lumber Company that had illegally acquired land in Wheeler County. He pleaded guilty, and was not sentenced after he testified against Hall and Edwin Mays. Steiwer had been pressured by Hall to support Charles William Fulton in his election by the state senate to the United States Senate in order to secure continued appointment of Hall as U.S. District Attorney for Oregon.

Winlock Steiwer died of pyonephrosis in Portland on July 18, 1920, at the age of 67.
