= Benson Syndicate =

Defunct crime organization in United States

- Named after: John A Benson
- Years active: 1875 - 1898

The Benson Syndicate was an unusual, 19th-century organized crime organization in the western United States which received contracts from the United States General Land Office (GLO) to perform cadastral land surveys of the public lands. It was led by, and named after, John A Benson (1845–1910), originally from Illinois and later a US deputy surveyor in California.

The Syndicate operated from the Rocky Mountains to the Pacific, but was most active in California and headquartered in San Francisco. Its tenure ran from an uncertain origin in the mid 1870s to 1898 but was at its peak activity from 1880 to 1885. In California alone, at least 40 individuals were known to be involved, and very probably more actually were; a major uncertainty involves how many people were involved, and where. The group's modus operandi was to generate false demand for public land surveys from supposedly interested "settlers" (see Public Land Survey System) using fictitious applications for surveys of specified townships. Two successive California Surveyors General, who were part of the ring, then awarded surveying contracts to Benson associates for the surveys. These were then fraudulently executed, ranging in quality from skeletal surveys based on minimal data, to outright fabrications of all data and maps. The required survey output – official notes and plat maps – were then forged to make the surveys appear legitimate on paper. The scheme only worked as long as no ground-based inspections of the townships were conducted prior to survey approval, which however went on for at least five years. The group's downfall was only initiated when these were finally instituted in mid-1885, which then was very rapid.

The surveys were officially contracted to individual deputy surveyors other than Benson himself, some of whom were not even aware that the surveying contracts existed in their names, having been induced by Benson to sign blank papers which were later turned into contracts and other legal documents without their knowledge. At other times, people with minimal or no surveying experience, and/or lacking proper qualifications as deputy surveyors, performed the work without the contracted surveyor ever being physically present, which was also patently illegal. In the worst cases, entire contracted areas, consisting of several adjacent survey townships (~36 square miles each), were fabricated by Benson or his associates at his San Francisco office, with little or no work on the ground at all, as exemplified in quotes from GLO annual reports given below.

== Extent of operations ==
Benson's organization infiltrated into very high levels of the government, and syndicate members in governmental positions as well as members of congress made the group's schemes possible. For example, in California two Surveyors General in the 1880s approved numerous fraudulent survey results and approved requests for government payment that were 200 to 700 percent of the originally estimated survey cost, which the government paid.

Theodore Wagner was especially notorious in this regard, and his appointment as California Surveyor General coincided with a large increase in the group's activities and power. Others approved contracts that had originally been rejected (after inspection by independent government examiners), without evidence or assurance that the surveys had been properly corrected or completed. Also, at least one such examiner in California was part of the syndicate, attempting to gain payment for some rejected surveys via bogus field "examinations" (which were themselves later rejected as fraudulent as the extent of the group's activities became known). Banks were also involved, providing the deposits and performance bonds required by the government, in exchange for a cut of the enormous profits generated. These banks later also paid for the syndicate's defense attorneys in trials brought by the government in its failed, ten-year effort to convict the syndicate members and recover funds paid for fraudulent work.

== Extracts from Annual Reports of the Commissioner of the General Land Office ==
Detailed information on the Syndicate's history remains fairly sparse, but reasonably complete descriptions come from two Annual Reports of the Commissioner of the General Land Office, in 1887 and 1888.

The 1887 Annual Report, gives this summary of its schemes:

In April last the United States grand jury at San Francisco returned forty one indictments for perjury and conspiracy in connection with fraudulent surveys of the public lands...The operations of this syndicate were not confined to California, but extended to the States of Nevada, Oregon and Colorado, and the Territories of Arizona, New Mexico, Idaho, Montana, Utah, and Washington. Its purpose was to control all surveying contracts in these States and Territories under the deposit system, to manufacture settlers' applications for surveys, to file in the offices of the surveyors-general fictitious field notes of surveys and alleged surveys, and to draw from the Treasury of the United States large sums of money on fraudulent surveying accounts.

The principal portion of the contracts were let in the names of thirty-four alleged deputy surveyors, of whom three were "dummies", two were intimately connected with the surveyor-general who approved the bulk of the contracts, and the remainder were relatives, partners, associates, or employees of the head of the syndicate. There was paid to the order or purported order, of these thirty-four pretended deputy surveyors upwards of $1,000,000, all of which went into the treasury of the syndicate, the parties used as tools being paid stated salaries by the syndicate for the use of their names and services. Three of the alleged deputies, to whom upwards of $190,000 appears from official records to have been paid, have sworn that their names were used without their knowledge, that they never had a surveying contract, and never received the amounts shown as paid them, and one swears that he never did a day's work in his life at land surveying and knows nothing of the business.

Every expedient known to legal ingenuity has been resorted to by defendants and their confederates to avoid and defeat trials on the indictments found, but it is hoped and expected that at the next term of the court the trial and merited conviction of guilty parties to this stupendous scheme of fraud, perjury, and public robbery which has been developed, will be secured.

— United States General Land Office, Annual Report of the Commissioner for the Year 1887, Annual Report of the Commissioner (1887), pp. 25–26

The 1888 Annual Report provides this example description of a fictitious survey of three survey townships in the high Sierra Nevada, southeast of what is now Yosemite National Park:

Township 7 South, Range 25 East and Township 8 South, Ranges 24 and 25 East, Mount Diablo Meridian: These townships are very rough, intersected by deep canyons and very steep, almost impassable mountains, in part covered with dense chaparral. Six weeks before the deputy claims to have commenced his surveys, all the people who live there in the summer are driven out by the snows, all business is suspended, and the mountain country abandoned. A comparison of the original field notes, transcript notes, plats and report of the examiner, shows that at the season of the year (from December 1, 1884, to January 3, 1885) when the deputy pretends to have made the surveys, the deep snows made the survey at that time impossible; that in the original notes (which are now in this office) much is omitted that is found in the transcripts and data supplied from memory, or rather made up; that disregarding clerical errors the transcripts are not in any sense copies of the original notes; that triangulations omitted in originals are audaciously given in detail in the transcripts, just as if they had really been made in the field, that the high speed, more than 6 miles per day, at which it is pretended the work was executed, surpasses belief when we take into consideration the nature of the ground, and bear in mind that the surveying was done during the shortest days of the year; that the deputy gives descriptions of erroneous bearing trees where no such trees, either as regards size or species, are to be found; that in the face of all the embarrassing conditions, big canyons, high and steep mountains, deep snow, impenetrable chaparral, precipices impossible to ascend or descend, the deputy with his two parties of four men each, frequently with the impassable San Joaquin river between them, pretends to have subdivided T8SR24E at the rate of more than 6 miles per day, and then accomplishes the feat of recording all this work in one field book. The conclusion is that the deputy did not make the surveys of these townships according to his field notes and that the notes are in large part fictitious and fraudulent.

— United States General Land Office, Annual Report of the Commissioner for the Year 1888, Annual Report of the Commissioner (1888), pp. 186-187

== Government action ==
It was completely implausible survey results such as these, as well as the sworn testimony of disenchanted employees or associates, that led to the recognition of the widespread fraud of Benson's group. Beginning about 1886, contracts held by certain surveyors thought to be aligned with Benson were not paid by the government, leading to various lawsuits. In 1887, forty one federal indictments for conspiracy and perjury were brought against Benson and several others, as mentioned in the Report quote above. However the trials, in federal district court, did not even occur until 1892, and when they did all were found innocent on legal technicalities. However their actual guilt was clear to everyone familiar with the facts, and surveyors associated with Benson had difficulty getting work. Because of this, Benson proposed what came to be known as the "Benson Compromise" in 1895 to the California Surveyor General, which proposed to correct or finish the survey work on several contracts that had never been paid out because government examiners had declared the work bogus. This compromise was accepted by the government, but little of this supposedly "corrected" work is reported to have ever been accepted by the Surveyor General as valid.

== See also ==
- Oregon land fraud scandal
- Francis J. Heney
- Binger Hermann
- Land patent
- United States General Land Office
- Bureau of Land Management
- Surveying
- Township
- Public Land Survey System
