= Francis J. Heney =

American lawyer, judge and politician (1859–1937)

Francis Heney
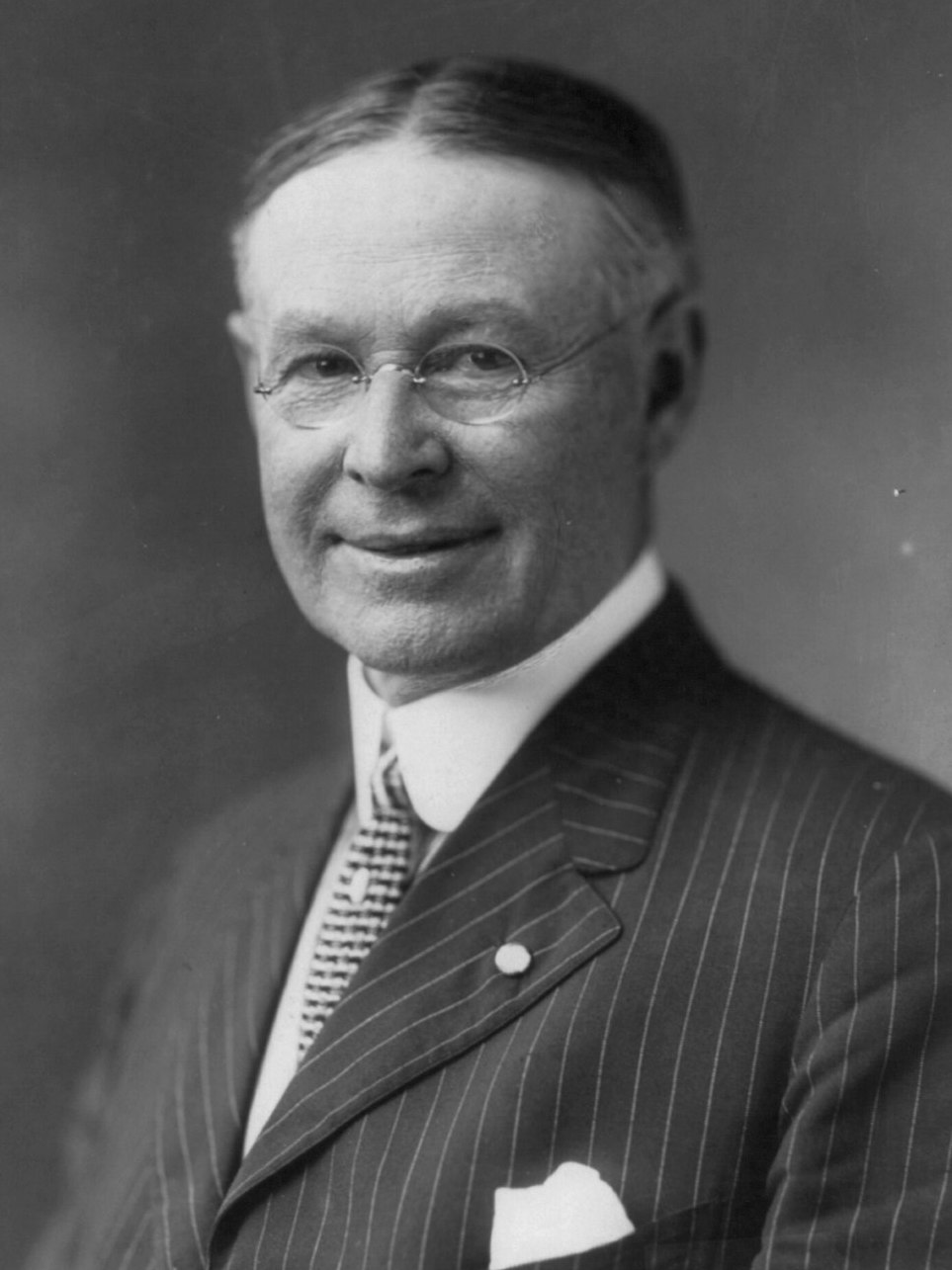
- Heney in 1912

11th Attorney General of the Arizona Territory
- In office April 13, 1893 – January 12, 1895
- Preceded by: John Herndon
- Succeeded by: Thomas Satterwhite

United States Attorney for the District of Oregon
- In office January 9, 1905 – December 5, 1905
- Appointed by: William Henry Moody

Judge of the Los Angeles County Superior Court
- In office September 2, 1931 – October 31, 1937
- Appointed by: James Rolph

Personal details
- Born: Francis Joseph Heney; March 17, 1859 Lima, New York, U.S.
- Died: October 31, 1937 (aged 78) Santa Monica, California, U.S.
- Party: Republican (before 1912); Progressive (1912–1916); Democratic (after 1916)
- Spouse(s): Rebecca Wentworth McMullin; Edna I. Van Winkle
- Education: University of California, Berkeley (BA)
- Occupation: Attorney, politician, judge
- Known for: Killing of John C. Handy in self-defense; prosecution of politicians in the Oregon Land Fraud scandal and the San Francisco graft trials
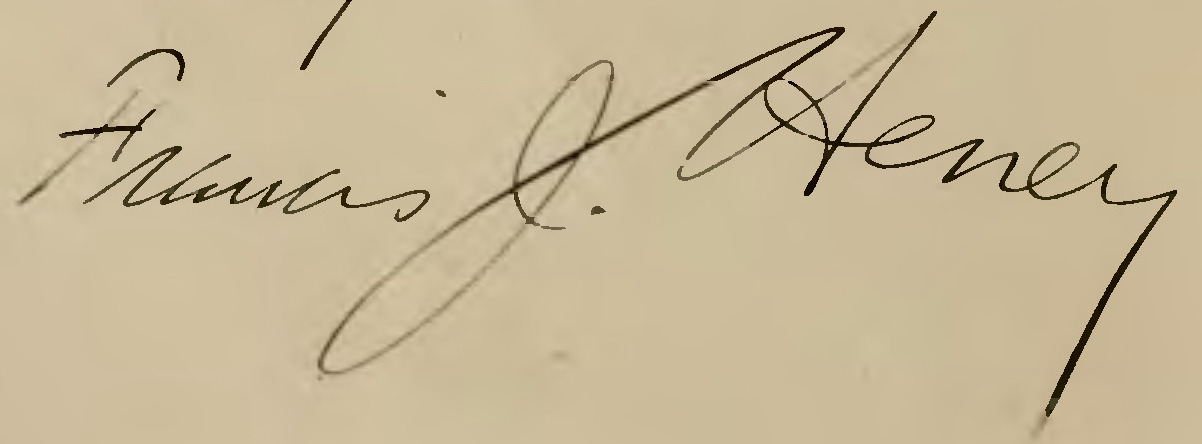
- Signature

Francis Joseph Heney (March 17, 1859 – October 31, 1937) was an American lawyer, judge, and politician. Heney is known for prosecuting high city officials in the San Francisco graft trials in 1906 to 1908. Heney served as Attorney General of the Arizona Territory between 1893 and 1895. He was the chief prosecutor of the Oregon Land Fraud scandal from 1904 to 1910 and served as US District Attorney for the District of Oregon, from January 9 to December 3, 1905.

Heney was shot in the head by a prospective juror during the San Francisco graft trials. In 1891, while an attorney in Tucson, Arizona Territory, he defended the abused wife of John C. Handy. Handy attacked Heney, who shot and killed Handy in self defense.

In 1906, Heney prosecuted San Francisco Mayor Eugene Schmitz and political boss Abe Ruef, for bribery. Heney revealed that a prospective juror was ineligible because he was an ex-convict. The man deeply resented Heney's action and while court was in recess, walked into the courtroom and shot the attorney in the jaw. Heney survived the wound, and the trial went on. He ran unsuccessfully for U.S. Senate in California on the Progressive Party ticket in 1914.

Heney co-wrote the California Alien Land Law of 1913.

== Personal life ==
Heney was born in Lima, New York, to Richard Heney and Juliana Schreiber Heney, of Irish and German descent, respectively. He had two younger sisters and an older brother, Ben. He grew up in South of Market neighborhood of San Francisco where his family relocated to in 1863. He worked in his father's furniture and carpet store while attending high school at night and, later, taught night school while attending the University of California during the day. After graduation, he moved to Idaho where he served as principal of a high school, but soon realized it was not his calling. He returned to San Francisco, enrolled in law school, and became a member of the bar in 1883.

In 1884, health problems prompted him to move to the Arizona Territory. During the next four years, he ran a cattle business with his brother Ben and operated the trading post at Fort Apache. In 1889 he moved to Tucson. He married Rebecca Wentworth McMullin on November 17, 1906, in San Francisco. After Rebecca died in 1911, he married Edna I. Van Winkle on February 13, 1915. Van Winkle had managed Heney's campaign for the U.S. Senate from California the previous year on the Progressive ticket. He lost the election to Democrat James Phelan.

== Killing of John Handy ==
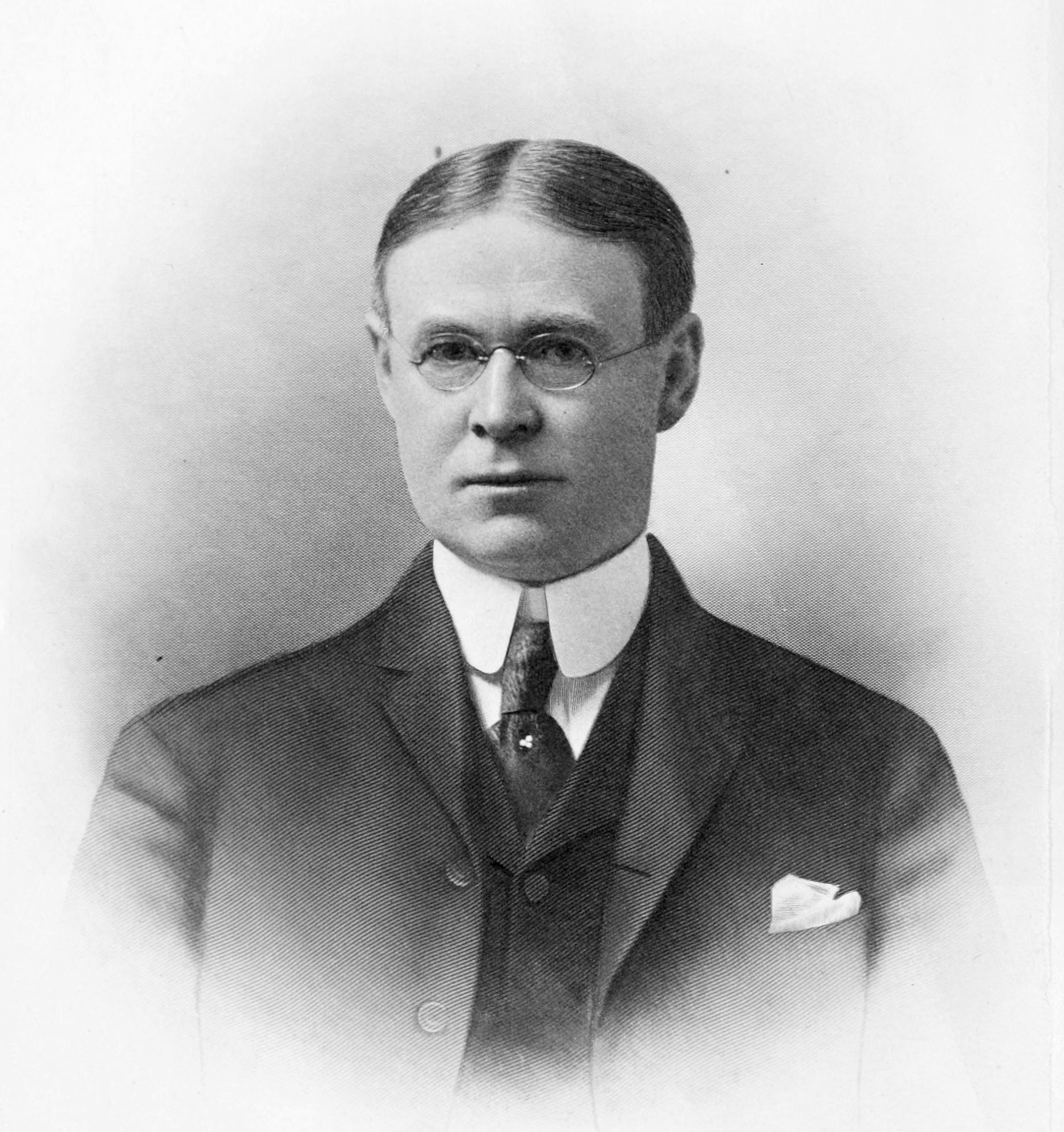
Francis Heney represented John Handy's abused wife Mary in their divorce trial and eviction proceeding despite repeated death threats from Handy. When Handy attacked him, Heney killed him in self-defense.

Dr. John Christopher Handy was a skilled and well-respected physician in Tucson. His wife, Mary Ann Page Handy, was eight years younger than her husband, and in poor health. She complained to her neighbor, the wife of Heney's' brother, Ben, that her husband abused her. In December 1888, she filed for divorce; rumors circulated that Handy had threatened to kill the judge and her lawyers, and she withdrew her suit within the next month. Judge Sloan described Handy as "a man of strong will, aggressive, and both quarrelsome and vindictive." The following year, John sent the couple's four oldest children to his mother's home in Oakland. Over the next four years Mary developed an addiction to morphine, possibly administered to her by her husband. Morphine was readily available at the time and was prescribed for a variety of ailments.

In July 1889, Dr. Handy filed for divorce. The town gossip was that Handy wanted to marry another woman he had been seeing, Pansy Smith. Due to her husband's continual threats, Mary had difficulty finding an attorney. When C.W. Wright agreed to represent her, he asked Heney to assist him, who reluctantly agreed, and Wright promptly withdrew from the case. Heney refused to continue on his own, and Mary Ann went from attorney to attorney seeking representation. Eventually Heney agreed to reconsider. Handy let it be known that he would kill any attorney who dared defend Mary Ann. When Heney agreed to become her attorney, Handy stated to a court clerk, "I will kill him! Mary Ann is a morphine fiend and a common slut. She does not deserve [representation]."

Handy publicly proclaimed that any attorney foolish enough to represent his wife in the divorce case "would be sorry" and relayed a message to Heney stating, "If Frank Heney takes the case I will kill him!" His attempts to intimidate Heney had the opposite effect, pricking Heney's conscience. Heney told his brother, Ben, that "If a lawyer can't take any case he feels it is right for him to handle, then he should take down his shingle." Heney and Handy had several confrontations. Handy intentionally attempted to run Heney over with his buggy more than once, and slandered Heney a coward, and also tried to provoke a fight. Clerk of the Court Brewster Cameron, a friend of both men, warned Handy that his threats might negatively influence the court, and Handy desisted for a while.

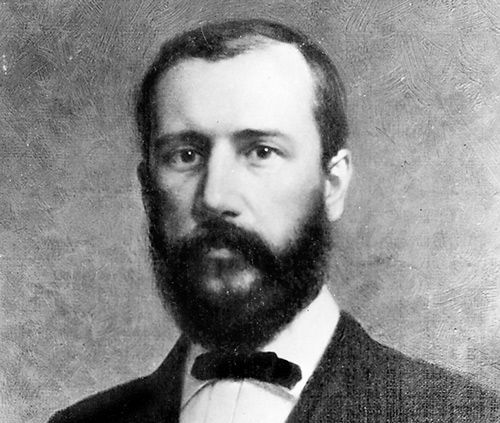
Dr. John Handy

The divorce trial dragged on for eight months, amounting to a stack of legal documentation more than 5 inches (130 mm) high, consisting of complaints, counter-charges, motions, and depositions from prominent Tucson citizens. Despite witnesses supporting his wife's allegations of abuse, Dr. Handy prevailed and obtained custody of all five children. But the judge ordered him to pay his wife $30 a month in alimony, gave her the family home, and rejected Handy's demand for a new trial. In July 1891, Handy, acting in his mother's name, sued his ex-wife for unlawful detainer of property, trying to force her out of the house that the court had granted her. His suit was dismissed but he went to a second judge and presented a deed that his wife had signed under duress two years previously. Heney represented Mary again and Handy made more death threats. Fearful for his life, Heney began carrying a pistol. Heney's brother Ben, who lived across the street from Handy, began accompanying his brother to and from the office. Ben reported that Handy said he would "take Frank's gun away and kill him with it." Handy hired a former policeman named McCarthy as a bodyguard. On two occasions the four men confronted each other with their guns drawn.

On September 24, 1891, while his brother, Ben, was in San Francisco attending to family business, Heney left his office for lunch at noon. Handy was waiting near the corner of Pennington and Church Streets, where he attacked the much smaller Heney, grabbed him by the neck and pushed him up against a building. The Tombstone Epitaph reported that "A pistol cracked, the men grappled and fell to the ground. A deputy sheriff dashed [to] the spot where the two were struggling for possession of the gun. Other officers were there in almost no time. Then one of the contenders jumped to his feet and ran toward the courthouse ... for the first time we ... recognized the hurrying man as Frank Heney."

During the melee, Heney broke away from Handy and had taken a pistol from his coat pocket. Handy tried to take the weapon from Heney and, during the ensuing struggle, the gun discharged into Handy's abdomen. Well-known doctor George Goodfellow attempted to save Handy, but he died hours later. Immediately following the shooting, Heney surrendered to authorities. Bail was set at $6,000, which three friends promptly paid. On September 26, a hearing was held. Cameron, among others, testified that Handy had repeatedly threatened to kill Heney. Witnesses testified that on more than one occasion, as the lawyer walked along the street, Handy had intentionally attempted to run Heney over with his buggy. The court determined that Heney had acted in self-defense and he was exonerated.

Handy's son John "Jack" Handy Jr. grew up in Oakland, California, living with his paternal grandmother, Roseanna Handel, and with his father's sister, Cornelia Holbrook. Holbrook told John and his siblings that Heney had been the one who threatened and ambushed Handy, and that he had been tried for murder and acquitted only because he was the sole witness. Young Jack grew up hating Heney. He ran away from his aunt's home in 1896, at age 14, and went to sea on a whaling ship. Jack returned to San Francisco in 1902, married Beatrix Walter, and moved to Tucson, where they lived with his maternal grandmother Larcena Pennington Page for about two years. After the couple returned to San Francisco, Jack eventually became an executive for Standard Oil.

Heney was Attorney General of the Arizona Territory between 1893 and 1895. He subsequently returned to San Francisco where he opened a civil practice. In 1906, Heney became nationally known when he successfully prosecuted timber fraud in Oregon. Heney was then persuaded to investigate the crooked political system in San Francisco. Abe Ruef, the primary target of his investigation, dug up Holbrook's story that Heney had ambushed Handy. Holbrook retold the story to The Daily News, which published it, and Ruef tried to persuade Jack to file charges against Heney. Instead, Jack thanked Heney for the support he had offered his mother when she was abused by his father. Jack had heard the true story about his mother's life and Heney's actions from his grandmother in Tucson. The two men became lifelong friends, and Jack was a pallbearer at Heney's funeral, in 1937.

== 1905 Oregon land fraud trials ==
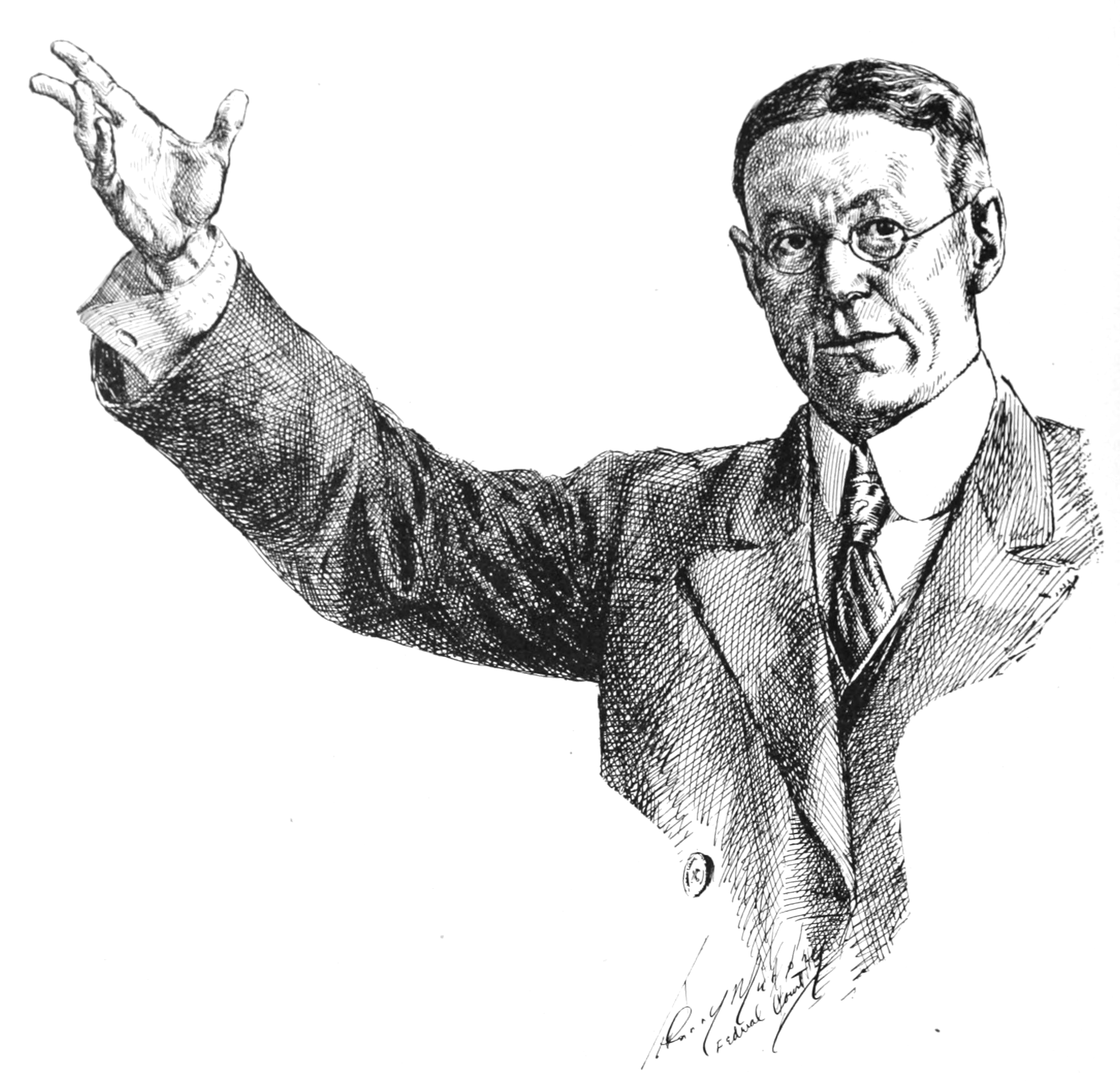
Heney as illustrated by Harry Murphy for Puter's Looters of the Public Domain

Heney was asked by U.S. Attorney General Philander Knox to serve as the Special Assistant to the U.S. Attorney General's office in Oregon. While there he brought to justice 33 people who had pillaged the federal lands, state school lands, and the timbered resources of the Siletz Indian Reservation in a series of trials known as the Oregon land fraud scandal. The "King of the Oregon land fraud ring", Stephen A. D. Puter, wrote in his prison cell Looters of the Public Domain (1908), a tell-all book with portraits of his co-conspirators and copies of documents confirming their criminal acts.

Heney's prosecutions cleaned out many of the personnel of the General Land Office. He twice indicted but failed to convict Binger Hermann, former Commissioner of the General Land Office in Washington, D.C. He obtained prison sentences for U.S. Senator John H. Mitchell, Congressman John N. Williamson, and Oregon District Attorney John Hicklin Hall, though Mitchell died during his appeal, Williamson's conviction was overturned by the United States Supreme Court, and Hall was later pardoned by President William Howard Taft.

He served as United States District Attorney for Oregon from January 9 to December 5, 1905.

== San Francisco graft prosecution ==
The "Big Four" graft prosecutors (left to right): Francis J. Heney, William J. Burns, Fremont Older, and Rudolph Spreckels.

While in Oregon, he was approached by Rudolph Spreckels, president of the First National Bank, and Fremont Older, editor of the San Francisco Bulletin, who promised to put up $100,000 to finance an investigation of corrupt city officials, and asked him to come as soon as possible to San Francisco to help investigate and prosecute. Older went to Washington, D. C. and got President Roosevelt to agree to lend special federal prosecutor Heney to the San Francisco District Attorneys office. In April 1906, he was a member of Mayor Schmitz's Committee of Fifty that tried to manage the city during the crisis following the big earthquake and subsequent fire, but the earthquake delayed the graft prosecution for only a short time.

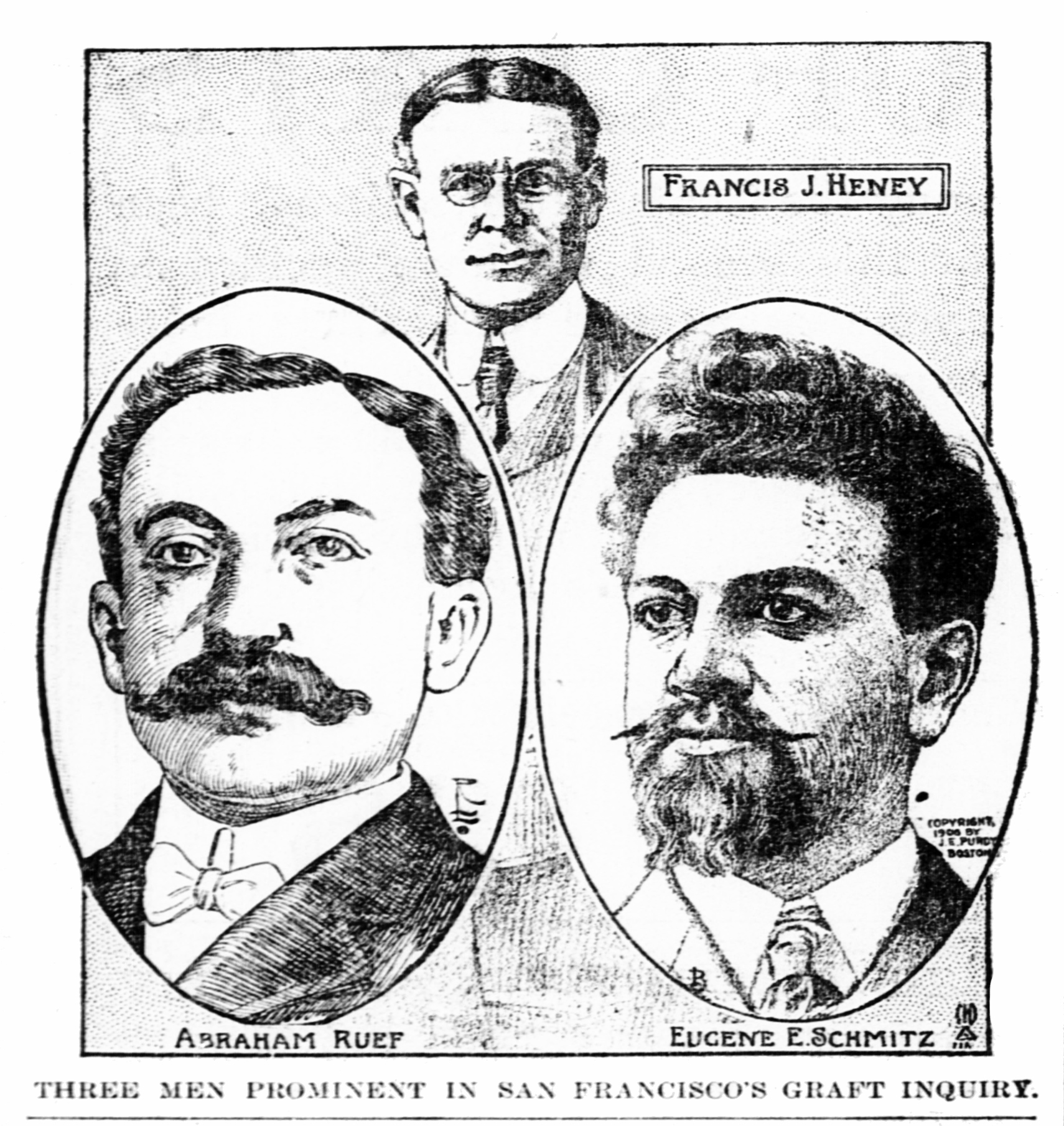
"Three men prominent in San Francisco's graft inquiry," published in the Rock Island Argus, November 30, 1906

On October 24, 1906, San Francisco D.A. William H. Langdon appointed Heney Assistant D.A. The next day, Acting Mayor James L. Gallagher, who as the Chairman of the Board of Supervisors ran the city while Mayor Schmitz was traveling around Europe – suspended D.A. Langdon for "neglect of office" and appointed Abe Ruef Acting District Attorney. Ruef then wrote to Heney: "You are hereby removed from the position of Assistant District Attorney of the City and County of San Francisco." Heney said he did not recognize Ruef as D.A. At 2 a.m. the following morning, Judge Seawell signed an order temporarily restraining Ruef from installing himself as district attorney.

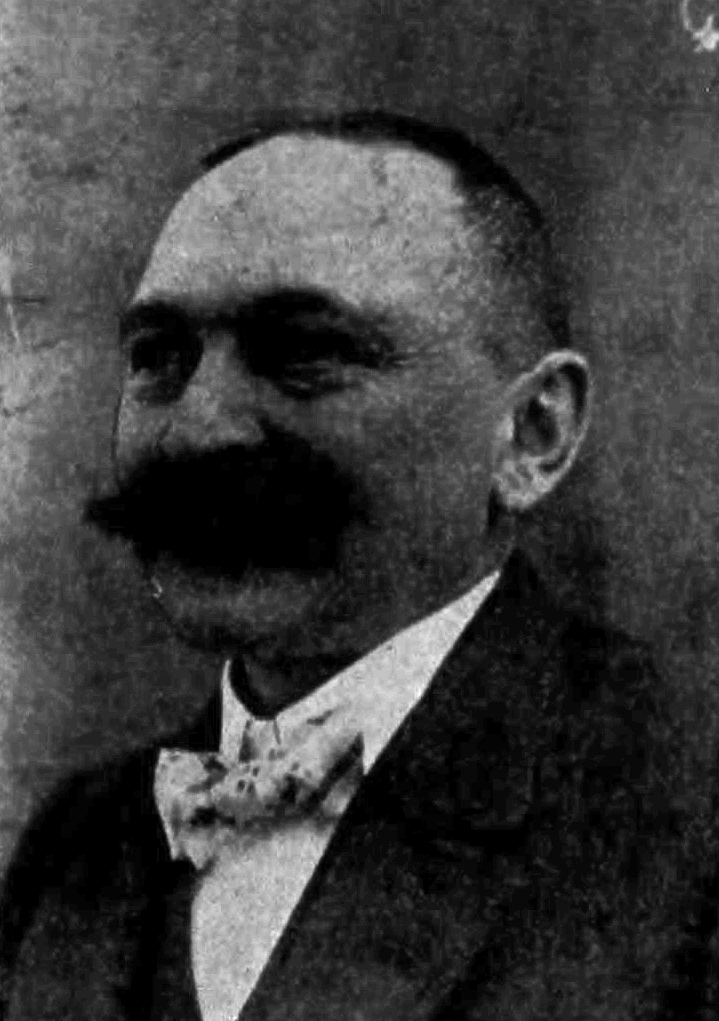
Morris Haas, the juror who shot Heney

Heney prosecuted Mayor Eugene Schmitz and political boss Abe Ruef for bribery. While examining prospective jurors Heney had publicly revealed the fact that one man on the panel, Morris Haas, was ineligible because he had many years earlier served a term in San Quentin Prison. Heney did not need to humiliate Haas publicly in this way; he did so in anger, believing that Ruef was trying to plant the man on the jury. Haas deeply resented Heney's action and brooded over it for many weeks. While the trial was in temporary recess, Haas approached Heney in the courtroom, whipped out a revolver, and shot the attorney in the head; the bullet lodged behind the jaw muscles, where a difference of a fraction of an inch in any direction would have produced a fatal wound. Heney was carried away on a stretcher, mumbling, "I'll get him [Ruef] yet." His place was taken by a bright young assistant named Hiram Johnson, and the trial went on.

Haas was placed in a prison cell with a policeman to guard him; but in spite of these precautions he was found dead the following evening, a small pistol beside him. Those who believed Haas had been hired by Ruef to murder Heney now believed, naturally, that some other gangster in Ruef's employ had done away with Haas so that he could not talk. The chief of police William J. Biggy was deeply hurt by Heney's public criticism of him for negligence in the Haas case. Biggy later fell overboard from a police launch during a nighttime crossing of San Francisco Bay, a possible suicide.

Heney did not die from his wound, as he had been expected to, and some days later the trial was concluded. Detective Burns had given Johnson the names of four jurors who, Burns said, had been bribed, and in his summation Johnson called each of them by name, pointed a forefinger at him, and shouted: "You – you dare not acquit this man!" Nevertheless, when the jury retired for its deliberations everyone expected that it would let Ruef go, or would disagree, as had happened in almost every other case growing out of the graft prosecution.

While the jury was out Heney telephoned Older to say that he was much recovered, and proposed to come down and pay his respects to the judge. Older, with his usual flair for the dramatic, told Heney not to come until the editor gave the signal. While most of the community was by now against the prosecution, there was a minority on the side of honesty, which had organized a League of Justice pledged to help at a moment's notice. Older now hastily sent word to dozens of these men, who came and crowded into the courtroom, which was directly under the chamber in which the jury was deliberating.

Evelyn Wells, in her biography of Older, tells what happened when Heney entered the courtroom on Older's arm: "The 'minutemen' raised a shout of welcome. Older himself trumpeted like a bull elephant. The rest of the crowd joined in. … It was a cheer of welcome, but to the scared jury on the floor above it sounded like a bellowed demand for lynching. A few minutes later twelve men good and true filed hurriedly into the courtroom. They had hastily made up their minds. All were deathly white. Some trembled. A few were weeping." But their verdict was "Guilty", and Ruef was sentenced to fourteen years in prison.

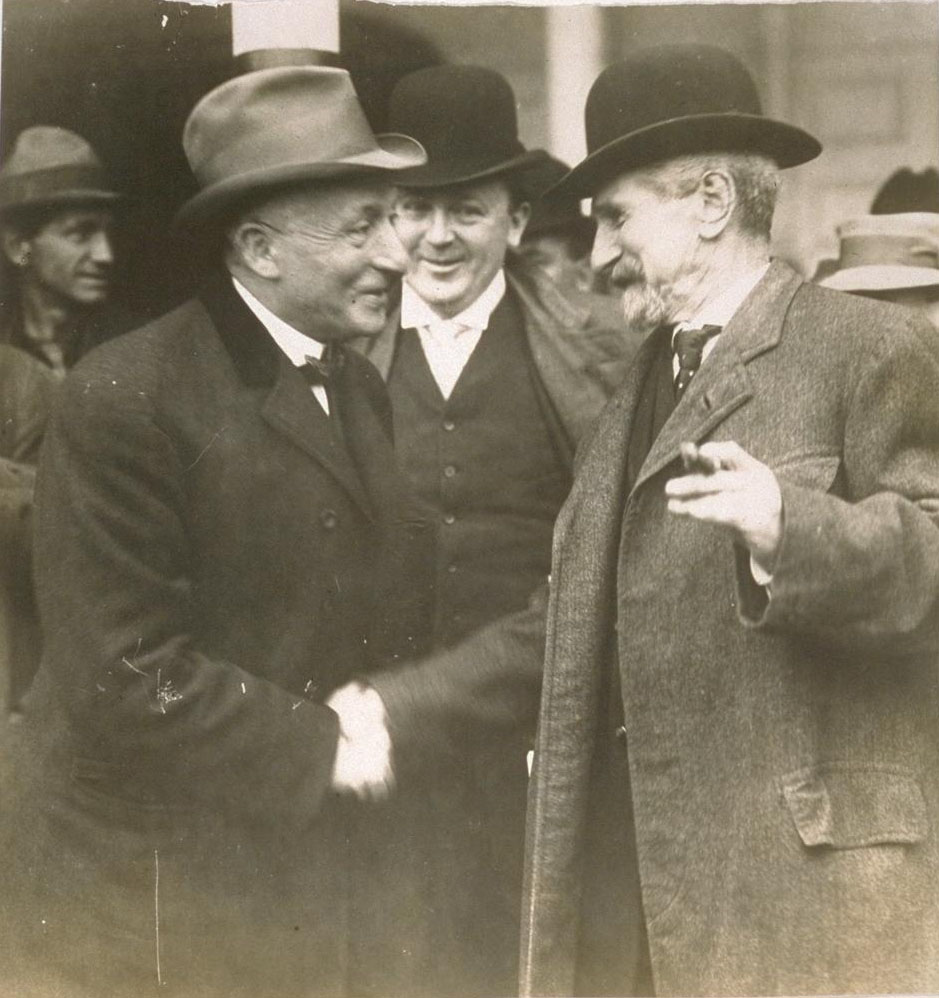
Political boss Abe Ruef (left) on his way to San Quentin State Prison after he was convicted in the San Francisco Graft Trial of 1907–1908.

Of all the sentences meted out to leading figures in the whole course of the prosecution, it was the only one that was made to stick. Another municipal election was approaching, and Langdon, the weary and battered district attorney, refused to run again. He was discouraged, with good reason: a key witness, the supervisor who had paid off his fellows on Ruef's behalf [James Gallagher], had fled the country. In desperation, Heney himself ran for district attorney, and was defeated by a football hero from Stanford University, Charles Fickert, whose liaison with the grafters was notorious. Fickert promptly and contemptuously refused to go on with any of the pending cases against the big businessmen. He pretended not to know the whereabouts of the supervisor who had fled, although everyone else knew that he was rusticating in Vancouver, British Columbia. William P. Lawlor, the honest judge who had presided in several of the cases, excoriated Fickert and ordered the others to trial; but he was overruled by the court of appeals, which decided that all of the large number of remaining indictments should be quashed. The graft prosecution was over, having ended in almost total failure, with only Ruef in prison."

== Later life ==
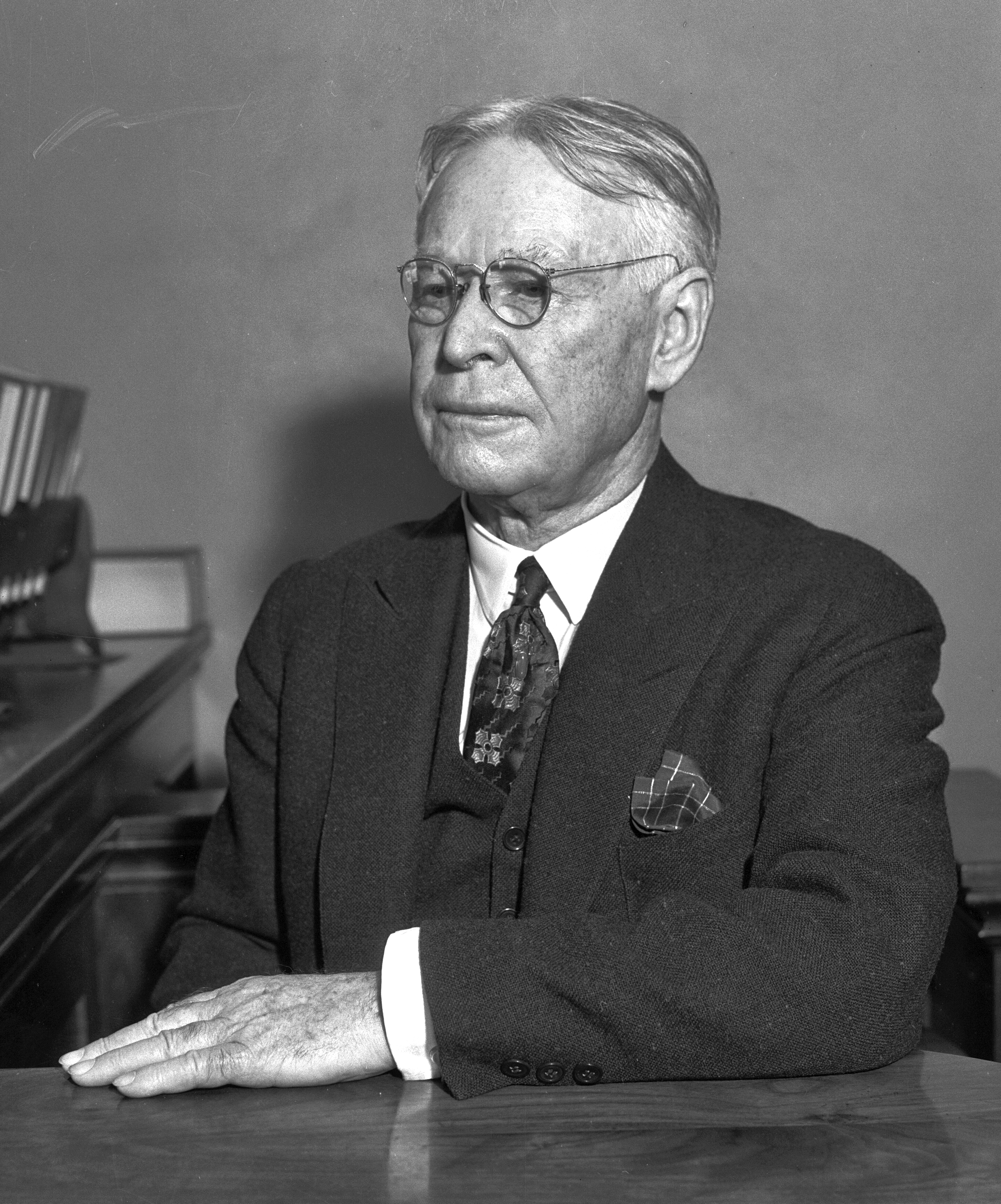
Portrait of Heney during his Superior Court tenure.

Heney remained active in politics after the graft trials. He was a California delegate to the 1912 Republican National Convention, pledged to Theodore Roosevelt. After Roosevelt split from the Republicans to form the Bull Moose Party, Heney was its nominee for U.S. Senate in 1914, the first held in California after the passage of the 17th amendment. He narrowly took second place over the Republican candidate, Joseph Knowland, but lost to the Democratic candidate, James Phelan.

Heney became a supporter of President Woodrow Wilson and in 1918 ran in the Democratic and Progressive primaries for Governor of California, but lost both. Continuing his law practice, he acted on behalf of B. H. DeLay in 1921 during the controversy with C. E. Frey about the ownership of the DeLay Airfield. In 1931, Heney was appointed by Governor James Rolph to the Los Angeles County Superior Court, where he served until his death.

== Death ==
Heney died in Santa Monica, California, on October 31, 1937. He was buried in Woodlawn Cemetery in Santa Monica.

== Sources ==
- Bean, Walton (1952). Boss Ruef's San Francisco: The Story of the Union Labor Party, Big Business, and the Graft Prosecution. Berkeley: University of California Press.
- Puter, Stephen A. D., Looters of the Public Domain (1908)

Political offices
Preceded by John Herndon	Attorney General of the Arizona Territory; 1893–1895	Succeeded by Thomas Satterwhite
Party political offices
First	Progressive nominee for U.S. Senator from California (Class 3); 1914	Party dissolved
