= Oregon land fraud scandal =

1900s public corruption case

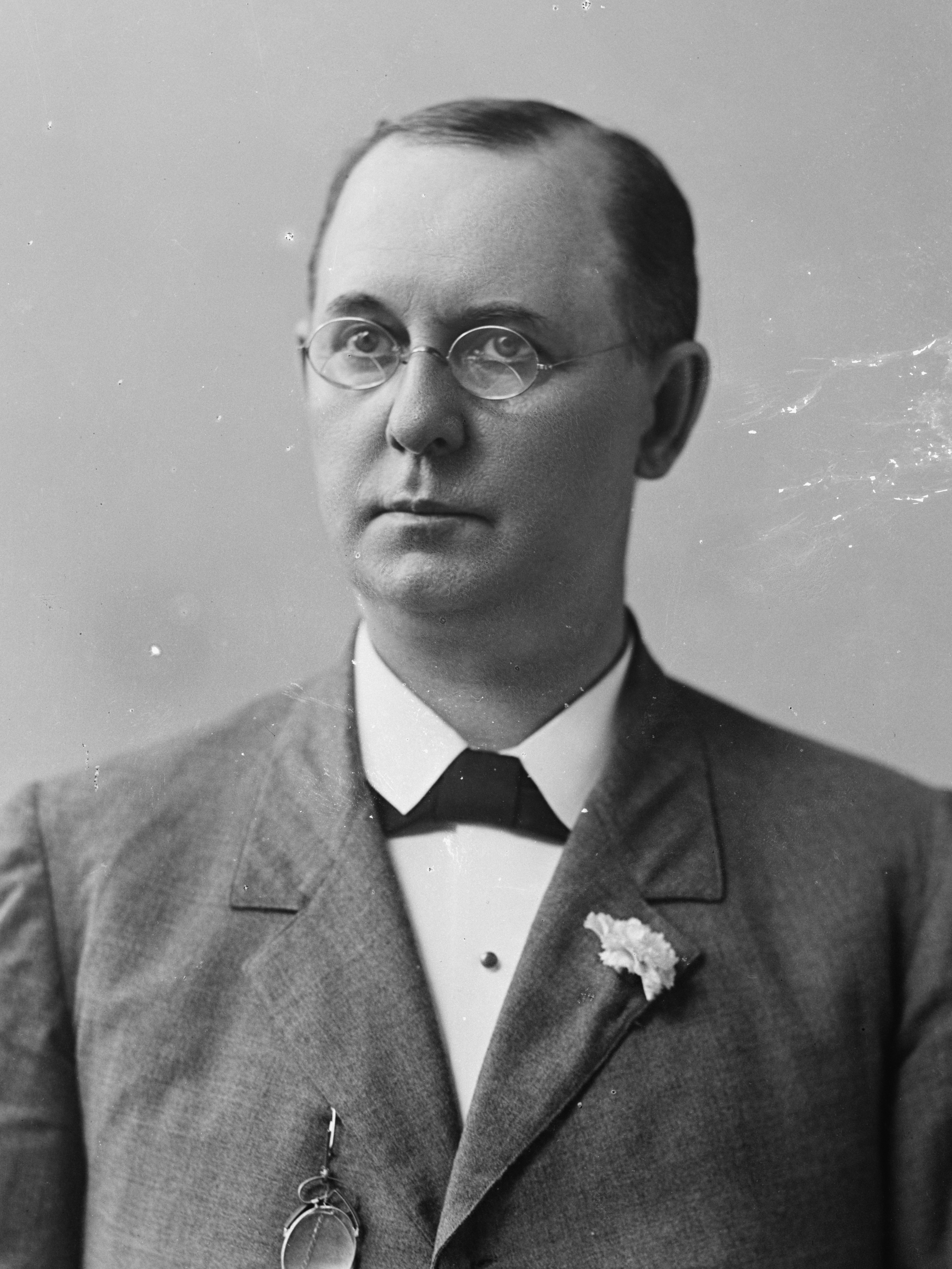
John H. Mitchell

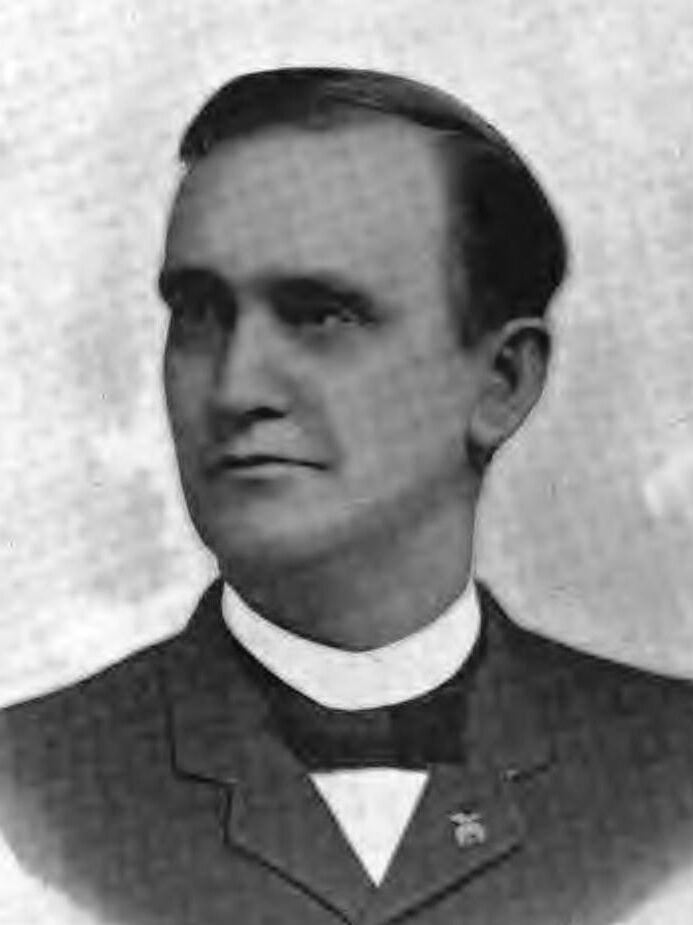
John Hicklin Hall

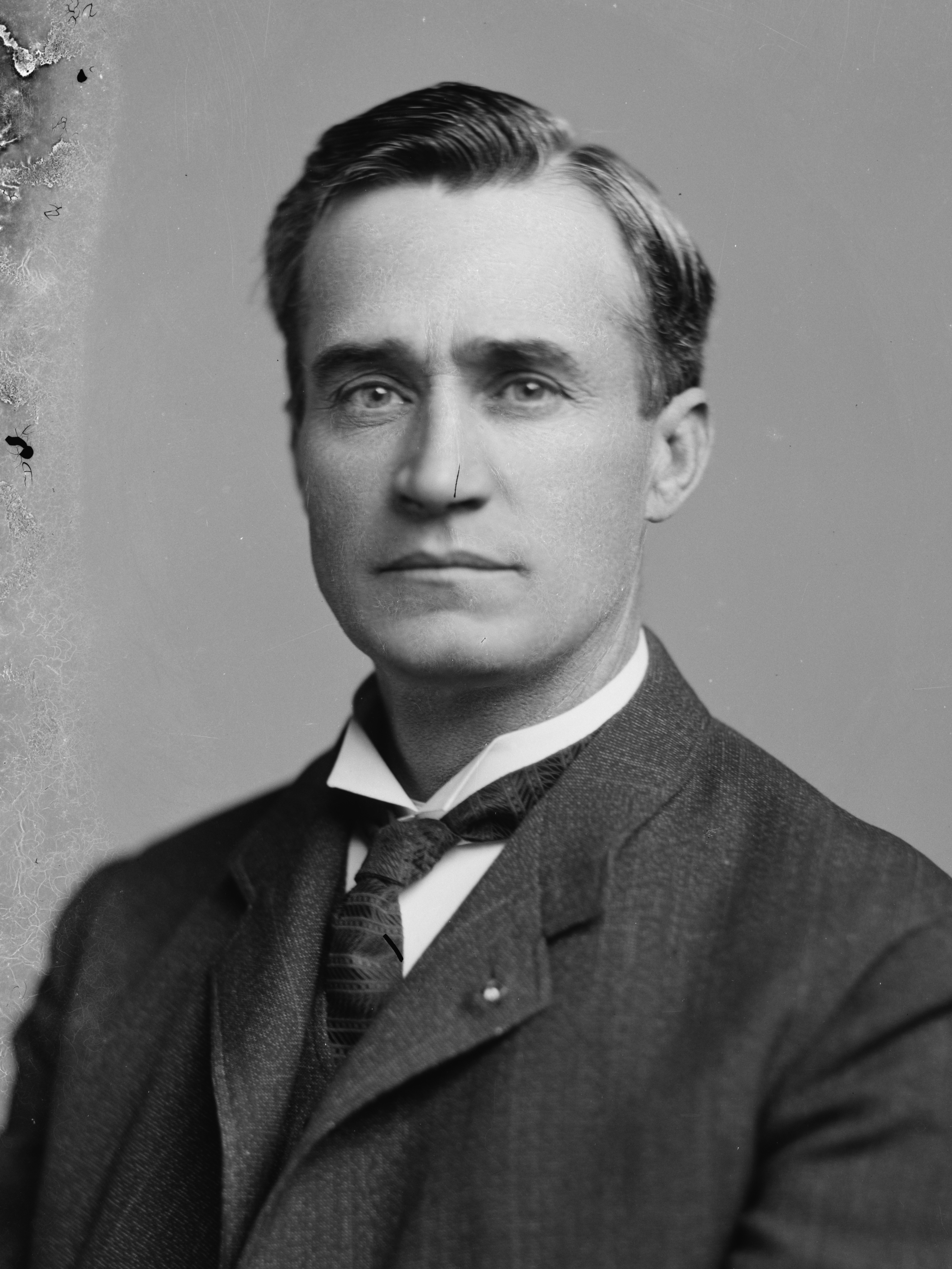
John N. Williamson

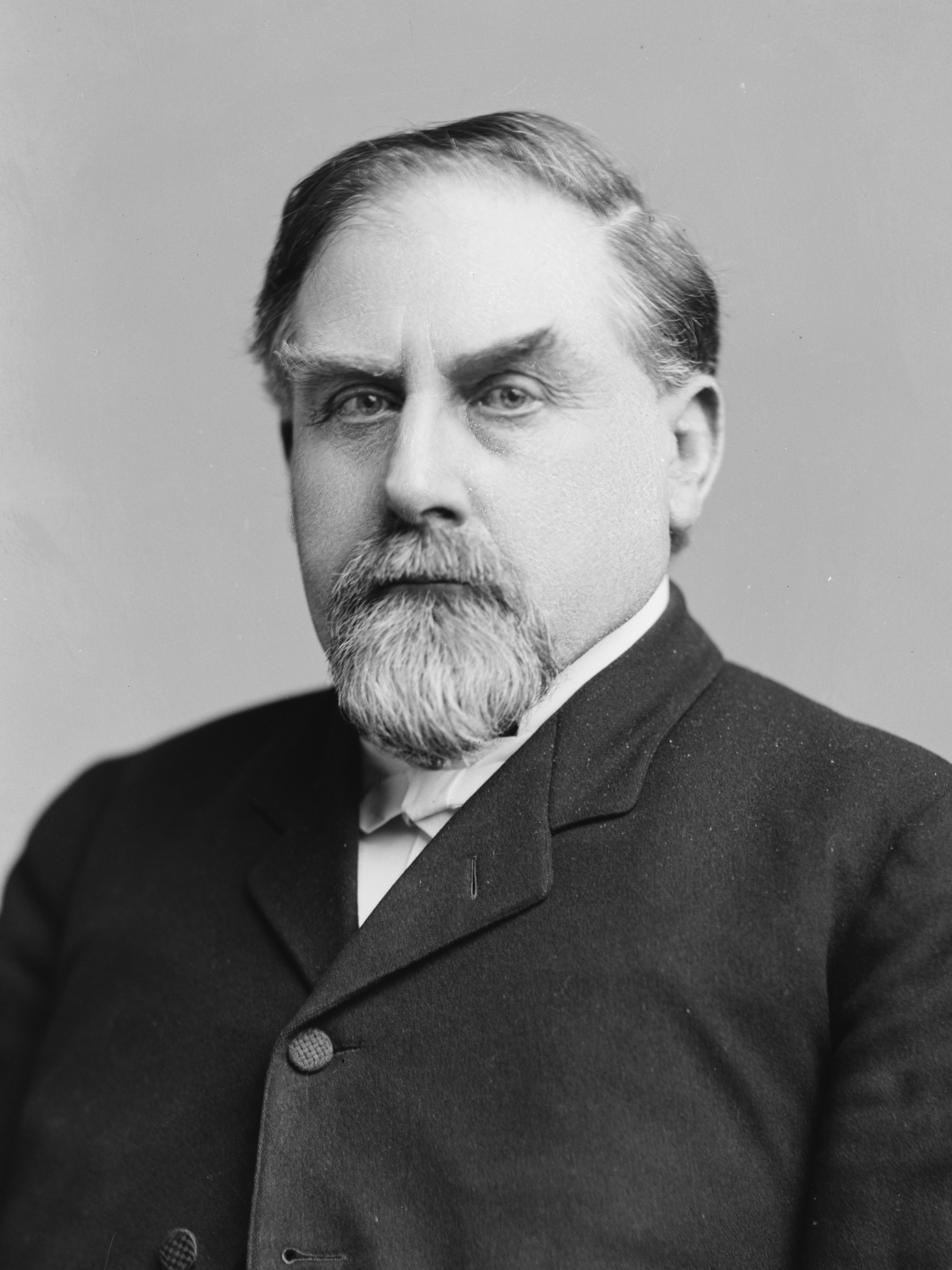
Binger Hermann

The Oregon land fraud scandal of the early 20th century involved U.S. government land grants in the U.S. state of Oregon being illegally obtained with the assistance of public officials. Most of Oregon's U.S. congressional delegation received indictments in the case: U.S. senator John H. Mitchell and U.S. representatives John N. Williamson and Binger Hermann, with Senator Charles William Fulton singularly uninvolved.

== Background ==
In 1870, the Oregon and United States governments granted the Oregon and California Railroad 3.7 million acres (15,000 km^{2}) of land to build a line, from Portland south to California. The land, which was granted in a checkerboard pattern along both sides of the railroad's right of way, was then sold to settlers in parcels of 160 acres (64.7 ha) at the extremely low price of $2.50 an acre ($100 in 2025) to encourage people to settle along the line, in order to foster development. In 1915, 2.4 million acres (9,700 km^{2}) of the original lands were reclaimed by the federal government and are today managed by the United States Bureau of Land Management.

“Had Sen. Mitchell held his peace, his name should never have been mentioned by me,” Puter raged to a former business partner afterward. “But since he has seen fit to denounce me publicly, through the columns of the daily press, discountenancing me in most scathing terms, I see no reason why I should protect him further.” The business that Puter had made his career in was one that had been going on in Oregon since the very dawn of Oregon statehood. By the time Roosevelt’s administration decided to put a stop to it, the wealthy and well-connected had been stealing land from the state and federal governments for four decades.

== Fraud ==
Since much of the land was unfit for development, it did not attract many settlers. However, the land was very rich in timber, which meant that timber companies would pay much more than $2.50 an acre. To circumvent the requirements of the land grant, Edward Harriman, president of the Southern Pacific Railroad — which then owned the O&C — hired former surveyor Stephen A. Douglas Puter to round up people from saloons in Portland's waterfront district, escort them to the land office, have them register for an O&C parcel as a settler, and then transfer it to Puter's men. The accumulated parcels were then sold in large blocks to the highest bidder for timber harvest.

== Exposure ==
Harriman eventually had a dispute with Puter and fired him. Later, when a lumber company bookkeeper exposed the scheme to an Oregonian reporter, Puter turned on his former boss, testified against him, and wrote a scathing exposé about the scheme, while imprisoned. The exposé would become chapters one through 25 of Looters of the Public Domain, (with an additional six chapters written by journalist Horace Stevens, a former General Land Office clerk).

These looters of the public domain—working with crooked federal and state officials—through rascality and fraud, gained title to thousands of acres of valuable, publicly-owned timber lands, and at minimum prices.

— Governor Oswald West.

== Indictments ==
Initially, more than 1,000 indictments were issued in the case. U.S. District Attorney Francis J. Heney narrowed down the list to the 35 most egregious offenders, including U.S. Senator John H. Mitchell, and U.S. Representatives John N. Williamson and Binger Hermann.

=== Mitchell ===
Heney charged that Mitchell had illegally used his position to aid a client in the acquisition of patents to fraudulent land claims. Mitchell's law partner and personal secretary both testified against him and, on July 3, 1905, the jury found him guilty. He was sentenced to six months in prison and a $1,000 fine. Mitchell appealed, but before the appeal could be heard, he died from complications associated with a tooth extraction.

Mitchell was convicted under Rev. Stat. §1782 (enacted 1864) which prohibited Senators and other officials from engaging in compensated representation in matters in which the United States was interested. The year before, in an unrelated case, under the same statute, Senator Joseph R. Burton of Kansas had become the first U.S. Senator convicted of a crime.

=== Williamson ===
Williamson's trial also resulted in conviction for subornation of perjury in 1905. The prosecution argued that the three defendants had attempted to illegally obtain land claims under the Timber and Stone Act. Williamson appealed his case to the U.S. Supreme Court, which overturned the verdict, in 1908, because of apparent jury tampering and witness intimidation.

=== Hermann ===
In 1907, Hermann was found not guilty of destroying public documents. His second trial for collusion with the actual land fraud was postponed until 1910, and ended in a hung jury; Heney declined to refile charges.

=== Hall ===
Heney also prosecuted John Hicklin Hall, who was the U.S. Attorney originally charged with investigating the case, but who had been fired, in 1905, by President Theodore Roosevelt for not aggressively pursuing the investigation. Heney charged Hall with failure to prosecute fraudulent land companies and for using knowledge of the fraudulent activities for his own political advantage; a jury convicted Hall in 1908. Hall was later pardoned by President William Howard Taft.

== See also ==
- Chamberlain-Ferris Act
- Land use in Oregon
- Benson Syndicate
- Winlock W. Steiwer
- John Hugh McNary
- Samuel B. Huston
