= Binger Hermann =

American politician (1843–1926)

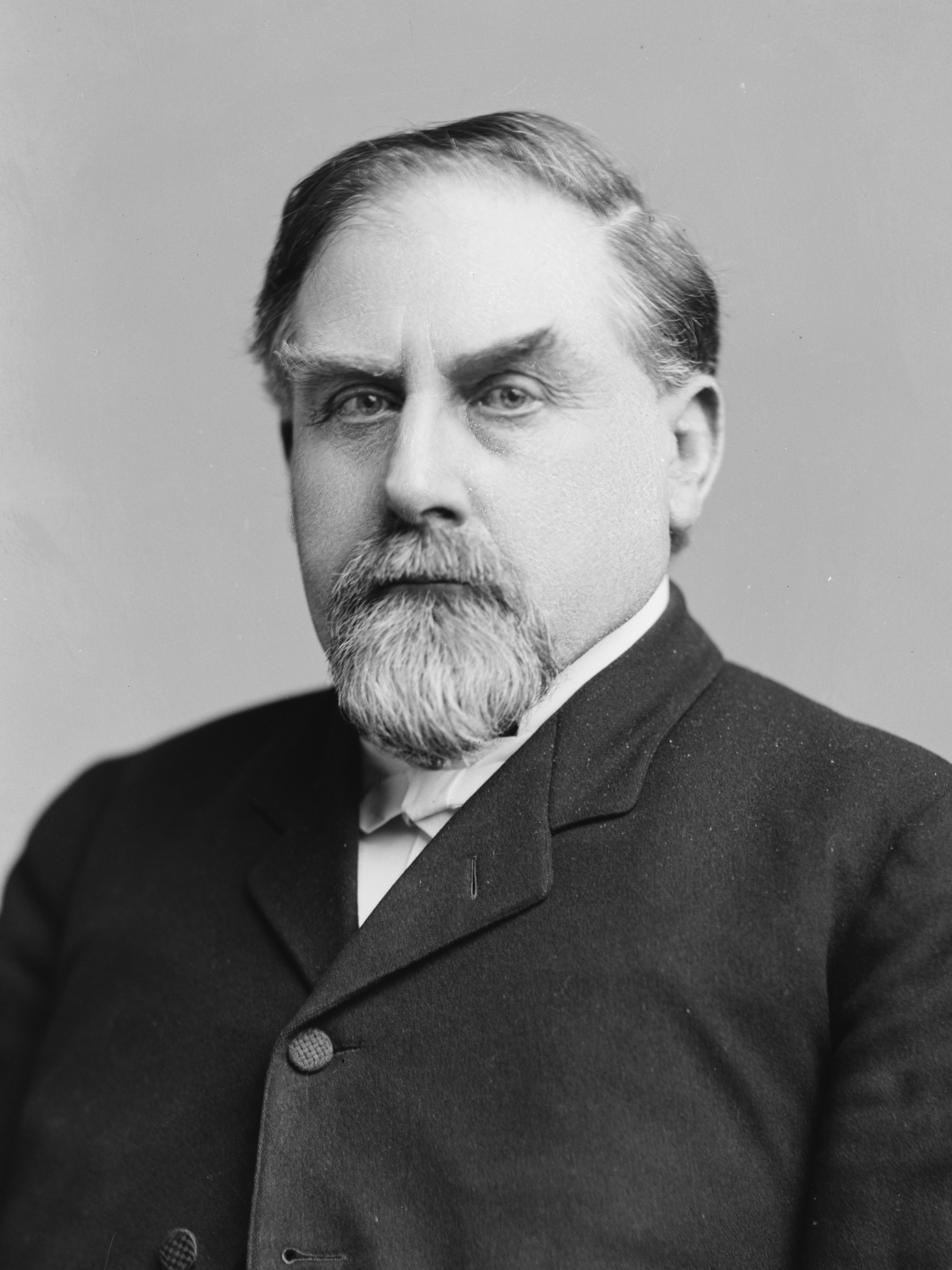
- Hermann c. 1901–1903

Member of the U.S. House of Representatives from Oregon
- In office March 4, 1885 – March 3, 1897
- Preceded by: Melvin C. George
- Succeeded by: Thomas H. Tongue
- Constituency: At-large district (1885–1893); 1st district (1893–1897)
- In office June 1, 1903 – March 3, 1907
- Preceded by: Thomas H. Tongue
- Succeeded by: Willis C. Hawley
- Constituency: 1st district

29th Commissioner of the General Land Office
- In office March 25, 1897 – January 26, 1903
- President: William McKinley; Theodore Roosevelt
- Preceded by: Silas W. Lamoreux
- Succeeded by: William A. Richards

Member of the Oregon Senate
- In office 1868–1870

Member of the Oregon House of Representatives
- In office 1866–1868

Personal details
- Born: February 19, 1843 Lonaconing, Maryland
- Died: April 15, 1926 (aged 83) Roseburg, Oregon
- Party: Republican

Binger Hermann (February 19, 1843 – April 15, 1926) was an American attorney and politician in Oregon. A native of Maryland, he immigrated to the Oregon Territory with his parents as part of the Baltimore Colony. Hermann served in both houses of the Oregon Legislative Assembly and as a Republican in the United States Congress.

Hermann served as the Commissioner of the General Land Office for a period of about five years. His written directives, known as the Binger Hermann Policy, caused mineral claimants of several lode mining claims (e.g., Lucky Strike Gold Mining Co.) to suffer from what is referred to as "cadastral mayhem" Many locators looking for a cure had to wait until August 8, 1904, when Paragraph 147 of the Mining Circular was revised under the authority of the Act of April 28, 1904.

In 1904, Herman was also caught up in the Oregon land fraud scandal and brought to trial for alleged land fraud. The jury failed to agree, and Hermann was never retried. Hermann was posthumously exonerated by the administration of Franklin D. Roosevelt.

== Early life ==
Hermann was born the eldest of eleven children in Lonaconing, Maryland, in 1843 to immigrant parents: Henry Hermann, a German-born physician, and Elizabeth Hopkins, an English immigrant. He graduated from the Independent Academy (later called Irving College) in Manchester, Maryland.

== Baltimore Colony ==
In the late 1850s, a group of Baltimore citizens, including Hermann's father, began to make plans to start a new life in the Oregon Territory. Dr. Hermann and his son met with Oregon's territorial delegate Joseph Lane to obtain letters addressed to prominent people already in Oregon who would assist the settlers. The younger Hermann wrote in his diary that he was fascinated by the politics and politicians his father brought him in contact with during that trip.

In April 1859, led by Dr. Hermann, seven families and several single men, known as the Baltimore Colony, left to build a new life in Oregon's Coquille Valley. The Hermanns chose a homestead on the South Fork of the Coquille River where Broadbent is now located, growing tobacco, sugar beets, flax seed, and raising honeybees. As Dr. Hermann found out information on Oregon's resources, he wrote articles for East Coast newspapers to inform other interested settlers.

Shortly after arriving, Binger Hermann nearly drowned trying to save a drowning child, before being saved himself by his father. He also witnessed a man accidentally shoot himself. Hermann later wrote in The Story of a Busy Life: "Discouraging as the accidents were, they only tended the more to inspire each one with new zeal and more determination to face the future."

Hermann would eventually open the first school in the Coquille Valley in 1860, and also teach Yoncalla and in Canyonville.

== Political career ==
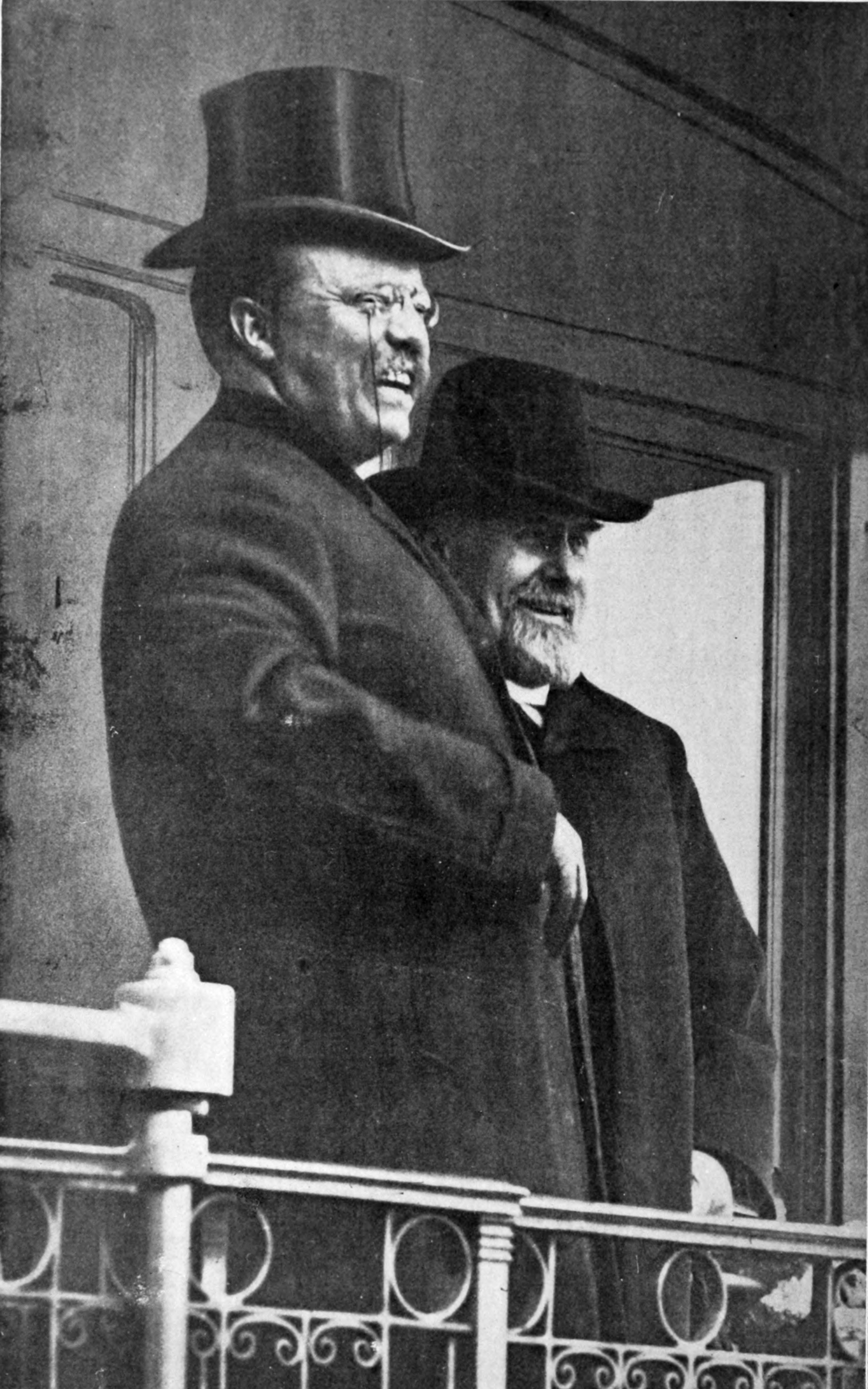
According to infamous criminal Steve Puter, this photograph was carefully staged by Hermann, for the purpose of winning the 1903 special election, to create the false impression of an intimate connection with President Theodore Roosevelt, who had in fact recently ousted Hermann as Land Commissioner due to improper transactions.

Hermann studied law and was admitted to the Oregon State Bar in 1866. That same year, he was elected to the Oregon House of Representatives. He served one term in the Oregon House, and then served one term in the Oregon State Senate from 1868 to 1870. Hermann also served as deputy collector of internal revenue for southern Oregon from 1868 to 1871 and receiver of public moneys at the United States land office in Roseburg from 1871 to 1873 and was a colonel in the Oregon State Militia from 1882 to 1884. He was instrumental in area river and harbor appropriations and for the establishment of lighthouses along the Oregon Coast and was the author of the Indian Depredation law, which provided payment for property damage committed by hostile Indians during the Indian Wars.

In 1884, Hermann was elected to the United States House of Representatives for Oregon's at-large congressional district. The Republican defeated Democrat Robert A. Miller in the 1890 election to win another term, meanwhile Democrats picked up 78 seats in the U.S. House in that election. In 1893, after Oregon was granted another congressional district based on the 1890 census, Hermann continued to serve in Congress, representing Oregon's 1st congressional district.

Hermann did not seek reelection in 1896, and was appointed by President McKinley as Commissioner of the United States General Land Office in Washington, D.C. He soon clashed with Secretary of the Interior Ethan A. Hitchcock over land matters. When Hermann's successor in Congress, Thomas H. Tongue, died in 1903, Hermann resigned his post and returned to run for Tongue's seat. He won the special election to complete Tongue's term, and was reelected to another term in 1904, defeating Democratic challenger Robert M. Veatch.

== The Binger Hermann Policy ==
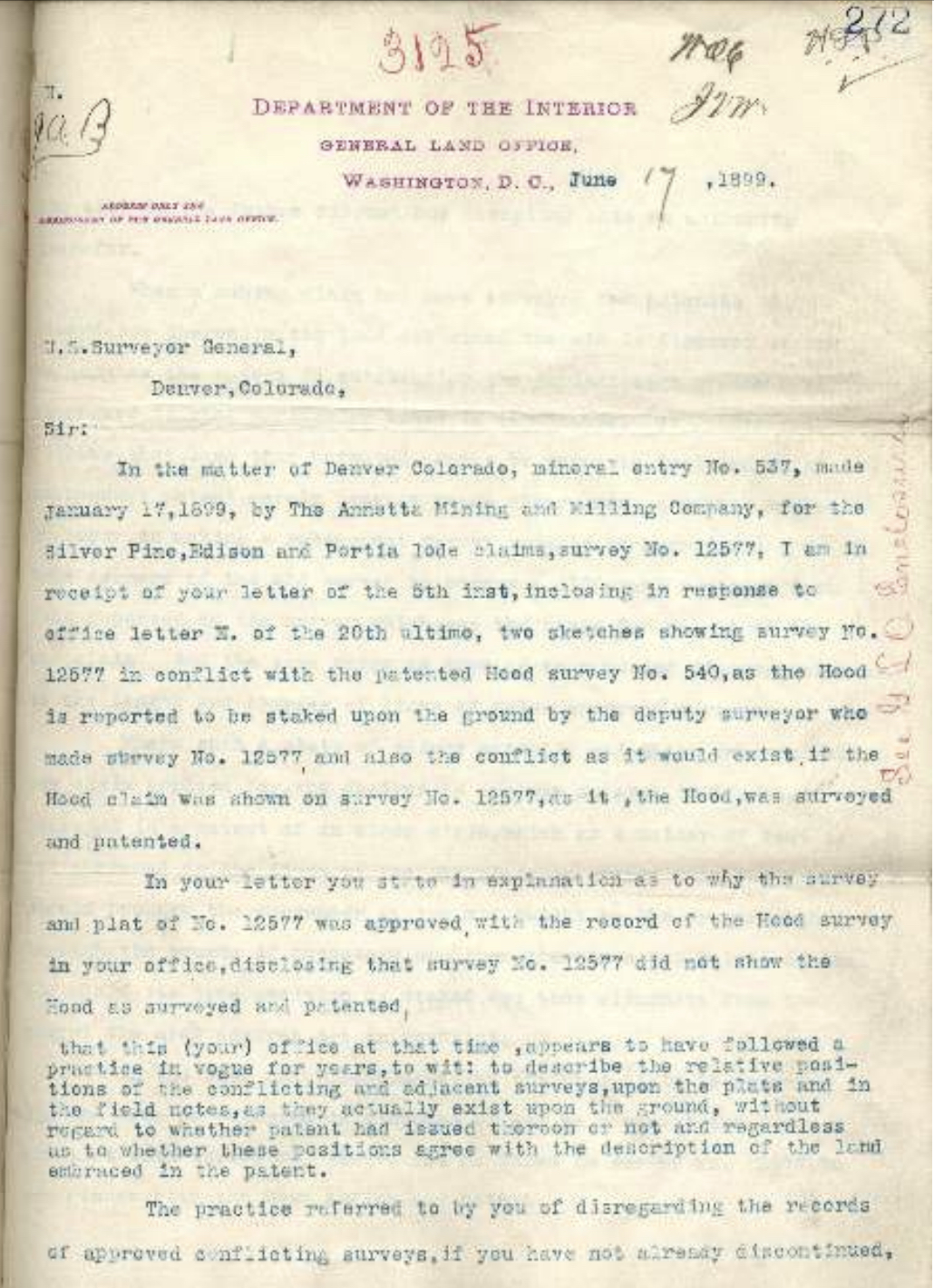
Infamous June 17, 1899 GLO Departmental Letter "N", Binger Hermann policy

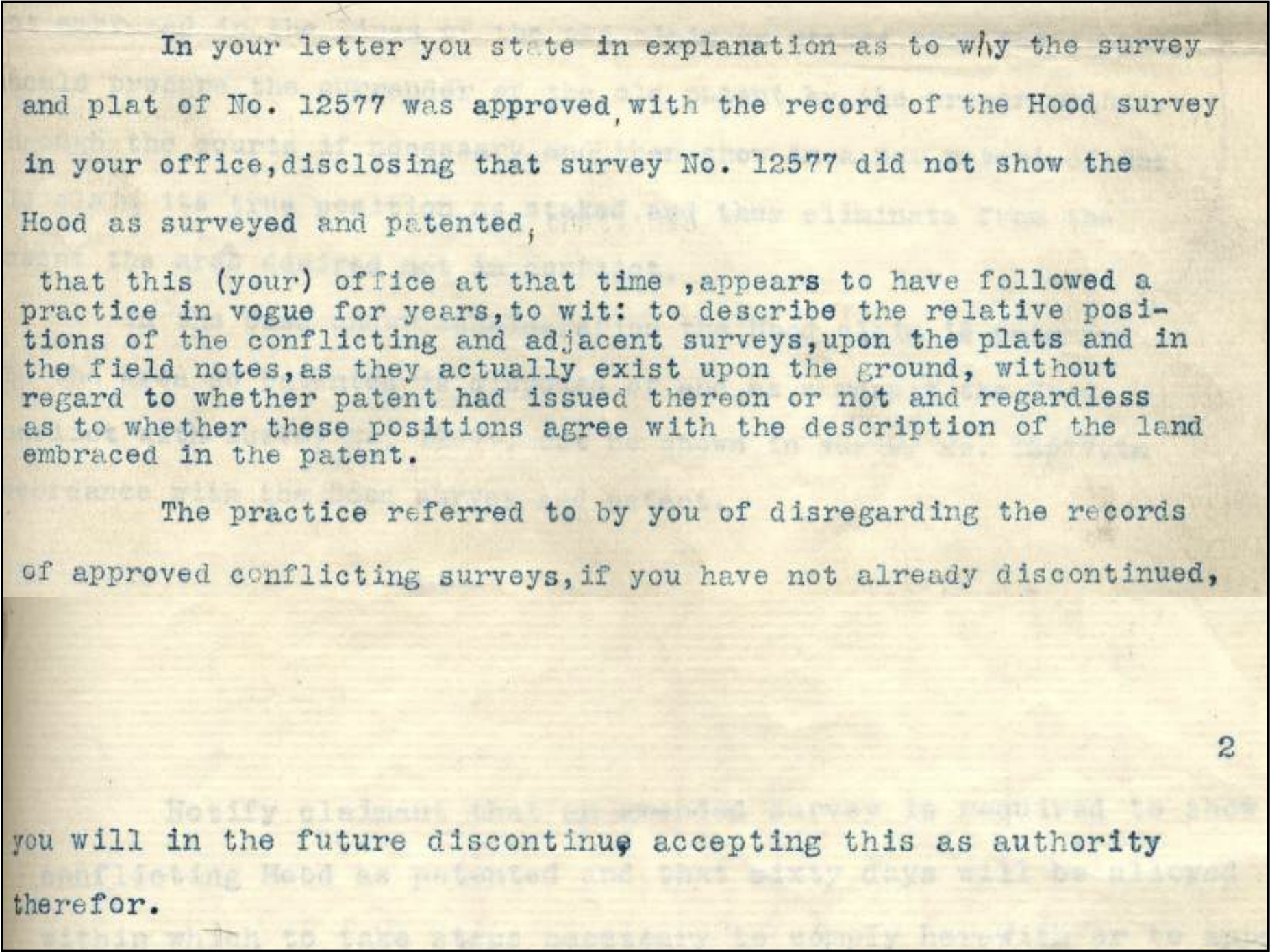
Close-up view of a portion of page 1 of GLO Department Letter "N" indexed 3125, dated June 17, 1899

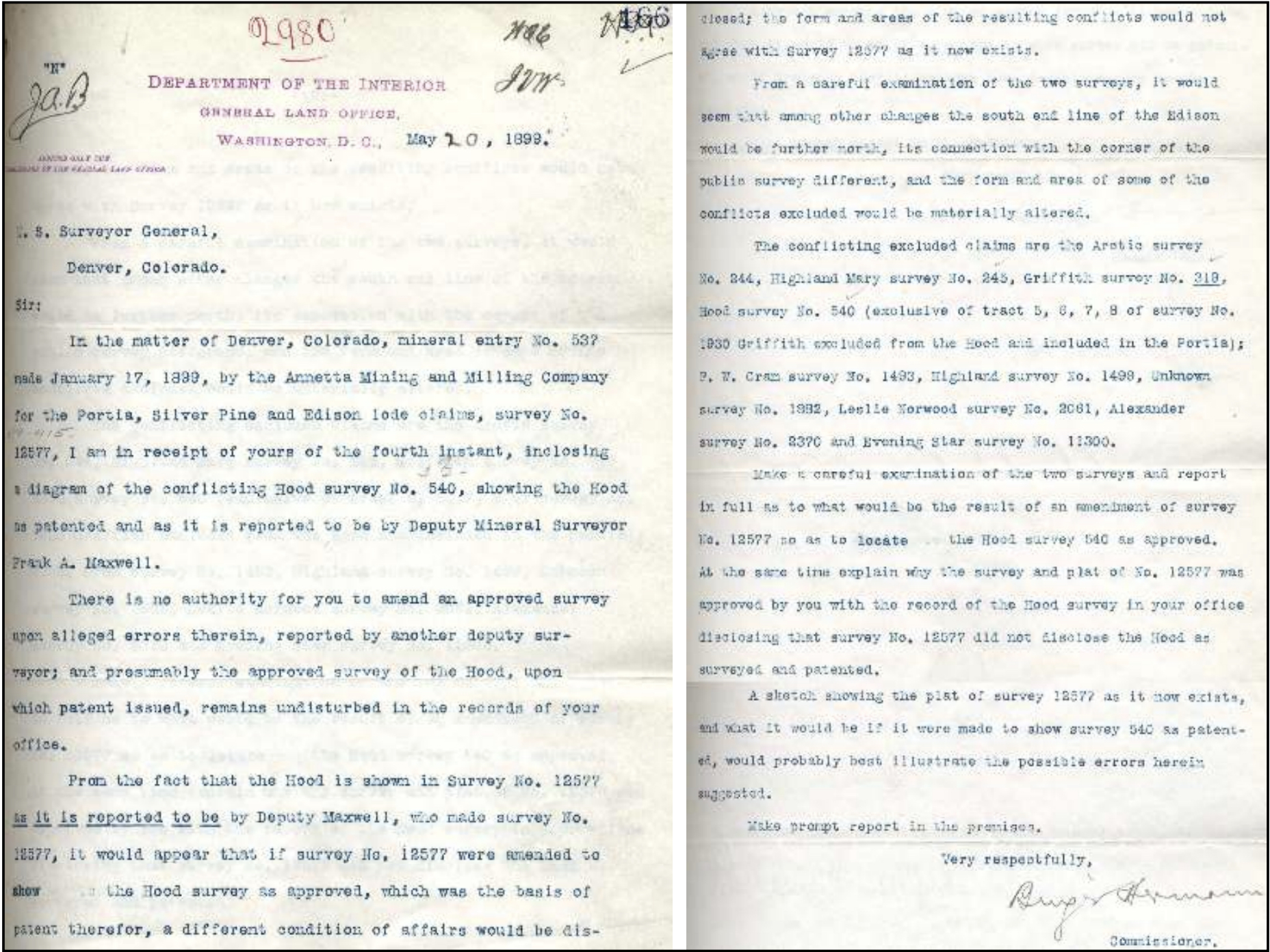
Binger Hermann Policy, Letters "N" Mineral Survey's -2980

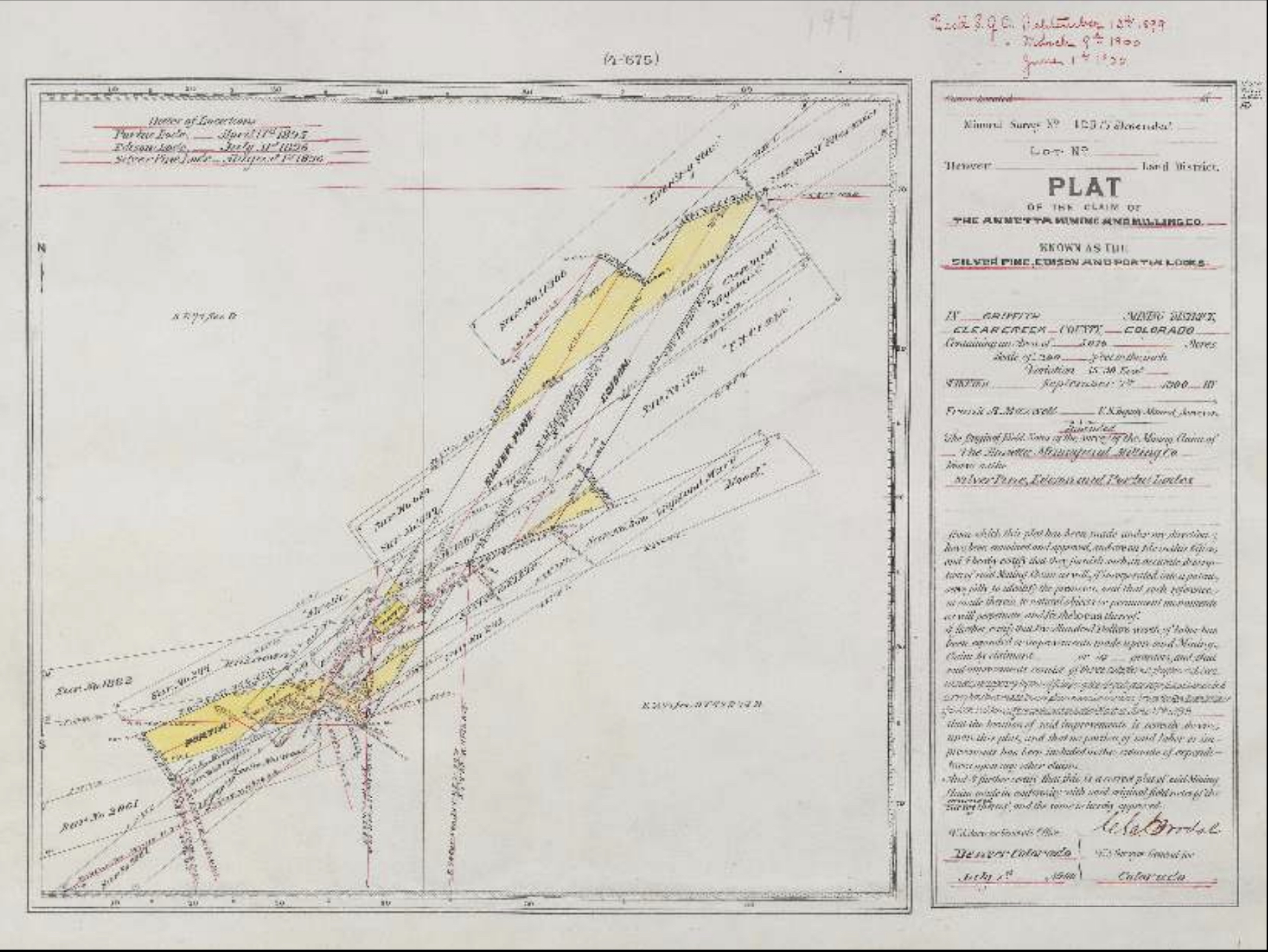
Mineral Survey 12577 ignored material error in patent description course and distance.

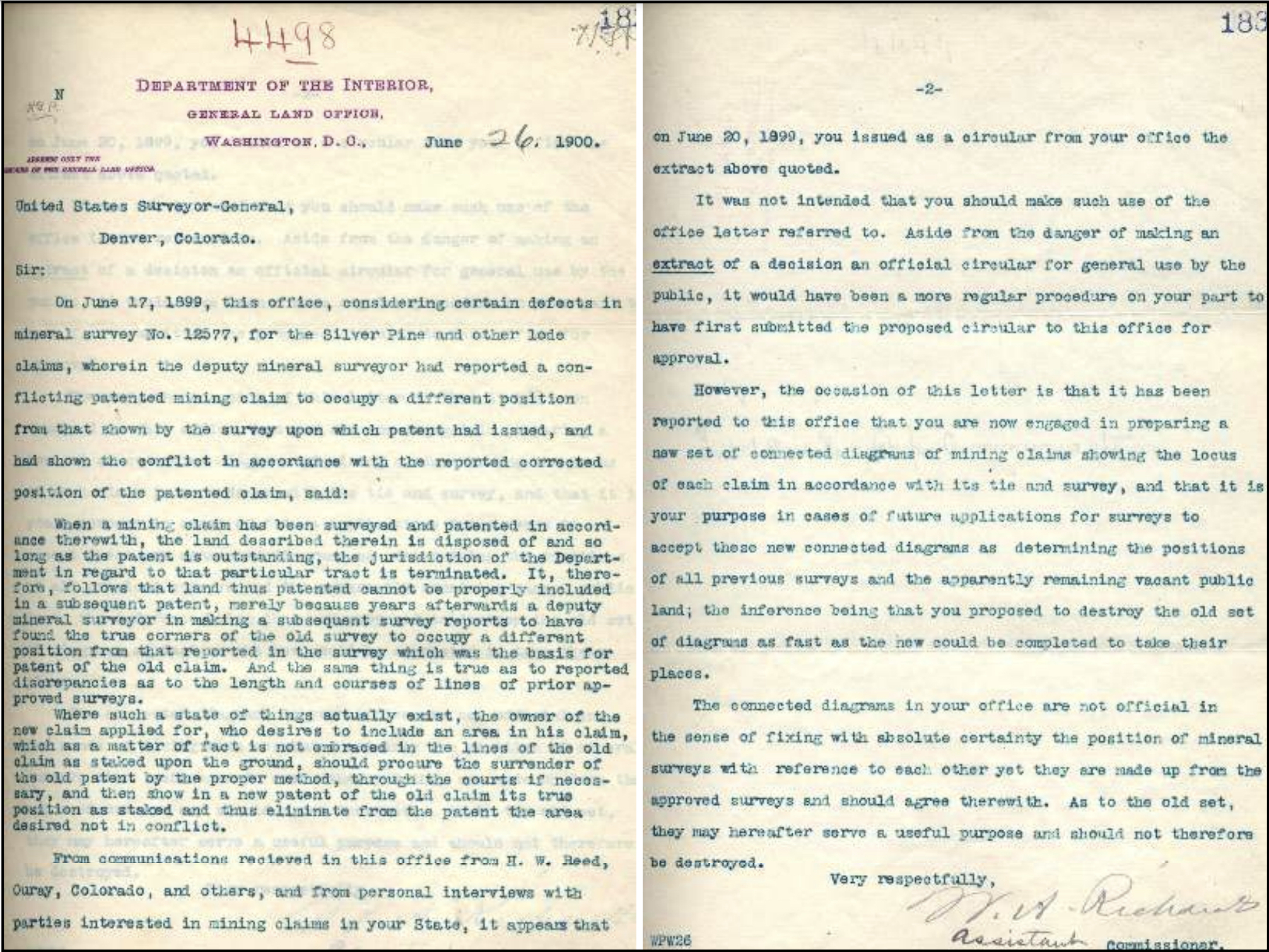
Departmental letter "N" 4498, William A. Richards, General Land Office

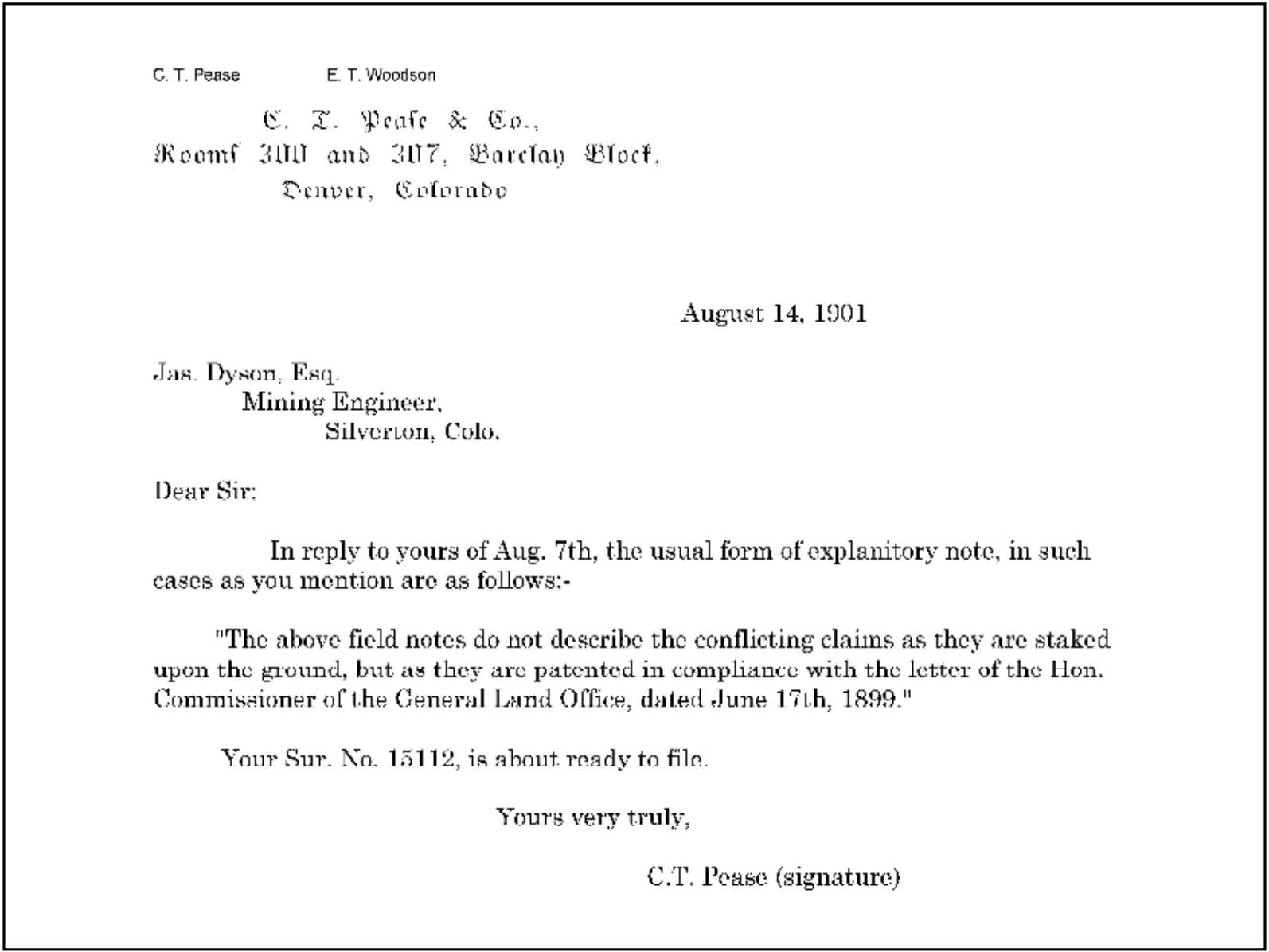
Mineral Survey Field Notes-Explanatory Note-Binger Hermann Policy, August 1901

The Hon. Commissioner of the General Land Office in 1899 (March 27, 1897 to January 25, 1903) was Binger Hermann. The policy did not take the form of a formal GLO circular issued by the Commissioner's office. It was initiated by a GLO Departmental letter "N" (mineral division) regarding a survey that showed a prior official survey in a position that did not conform to its record.

Mr. C.C. Goodale, the U.S. Surveyor General for Colorado in his zeal to comply with the Commissioner's "directive" created mayhem. The new policy was that a prior official survey, in conflict with the mining claim being surveyed, must be shown on the plat in its patented position rather than where the monuments on the ground marked it to be.

The policy was not well documented. A brief note on page 117 of James Underhill's book Mineral Land Surveying, 1906:

Here it may be observed that for about five years between June 1899 and August 1904, the GLO required all claims to be figured according to their patented positions… regardless of the existence or position of the monuments on the ground. As the section ties of many claims varied from a few feet to many thousand feet from the correct distance, the official plats issued during the period mentioned above, often give a very erroneous idea of the conditions actually existing on the ground.

General Land Office Departmental Letter "N" indexed 2980, dated May 20, 1899, signed by Binger Hermann, Commissioner: The surveys referred to are the Portia, Silver Pine and Edison lodes, Sur. No. 12577, approved August 13, 1898; and the Hood Lode, Sur. No. 540, original survey approved July 24, 1875, amended survey approved March 16, 1881. Note: The Departmental Letter "N" takes the Colorado Surveyor General to task that he does NOT have the authority to "amend an approved survey upon alleged errors therein, reported by another deputy surveyor…" The GLO Commissioner required a careful examination of the two surveys and report, "in full as to what would be the result of an amendment of Sur. No. 12577 so as to locate the Hood, Sur. No.540 as approved… A sketch showing the plat of Sur. No. 12577 as it now exists, and what it would be if it were made to show Sur. No. 540 as patented, would probably best illustrate the possible errors herein suggested."

The 12577 amended Mineral survey is the first survey to suffer from the Cadastral mayhem instilled within the Binger Hermann policy, that being the sanctity of patent descriptions over original, undisturbed monuments or their perpetuations.

A word of caution in using other mineral survey ties: In Colorado, and presumably in other states, there was a period where the short ties to conflicting surveys were calculated through the section corner tie. Such calculated ties should not be used. This period is not exactly known, but it ran approximately from 1898 to April 28, 1904. If a report of other surveys was contained in the field notes, the ties were not calculated.

— John V. Meldrum's, Mineral Survey Procedures Guide (1980)

Excerpt of United States General Land Office Departmental Letter "N" indexed 3125, dated June 17, 1899. This letter responds to the report submitted by the Colorado Surveyor General (dated June 5, 1899) required in Departmental Letter "N" (indexed 2980). Note: This is the infamous June 17, 1899, GLO Departmental Letter "N" that is the basis of the five+ year policy referred to as the Binger Hermann policy.

The Binger Hermann policy continued beyond 1904, as it is known to have reached other mining districts outside of Colorado. Records of the United States General Land Office containing Mineral Surveys, covering the various mineral districts of Colorado and every other mining State and Territory, showcase conditions which obtain varying degrees of land sections. As provided by the Mining Reporter on February 4, 1904, seemingly endless examples of mineral survey misconstruction already existed, compromising the public lands, patented claims. Ground which is actually unpatented and open is construed to be patented to claims which occupy entirely different tracts.

Excerpt taken from the annual report prepared by Edward H. Anderson, Utah Surveyor General dated June 30, 1901: "The Department of Interior holds that courses and distances once incorporated into a patent must be recognized in all subsequent conflicting & adjacent surveys, notwithstanding actual conditions on the ground to the contrary. This means a perpetuation of the error, if any exist, in the former patented survey, and the deputy who makes the latter survey is compelled to falsify his returns to conform to such error. The courts hold that the monuments and markings on the ground govern." Mr. Anderson included the same paragraph in his 1902 and 1903 reports to the GLO Commissioner. Mr. Anderson's statements are a stark reminder that the Binger Hermann policy is Cadastral vandalism of the official field notes, approved plat and patent.

Theoretical exclusions in mineral patents is only one of the two possibilities when patent description positions are held over monumented positions for prior official surveys. The other, which might be more insidious is when there is a true conflict, but the patent fails to exclude the conflict because the conflicting claims patent description position does not conflict.

— Certified Federal Surveyors Program (CFedS). Co-administered by the Department of the Interior's Bureau of Land Management and the National Society of Professional Surveyors (NSPS)

== Oregon land fraud scandal ==
Binger Hermann was singled out for election year scorn by the Democratic press during the 1904 campaign for involvement in a land fraud scandal.

During his second stint in Congress, Hermann was accused by Hitchcock of fraud against the government, claiming that information on land fraud in Oregon had been sent to Hermann and had been ignored, and that Hermann might have removed or disposed of several files and letters from the General Land Office concerning certain fraud investigations. This scandal, which included nearly all of Oregon's congressional delegation, came to be known as the Oregon land fraud scandal.

Hermann was found not guilty of destroying public documents in 1907, but remained under indictment for collusion in a land deal in the Blue Mountain Forest Reserve in Oregon. A trial was held on that charge in 1910 and ended in a hung jury. U.S. District Attorney Francis J. Heney declined to refile charges. In 1932, Franklin Roosevelt's Interior Secretary Harold L. Ickes, exonerated Hermann of any wrongdoing.

== Final years ==
Hermann returned to Roseburg, where he resumed his law practice and engaged in literary pursuits until his death.

Binger Hermann died April 15, 1926, two months after a surgical operation, from which he never fully recovered. He was 83 years old at the time of his death.

In June 1943 the Oregon Shipbuilding Company launched its 210th Liberty ship, the Binger Hermann, named after the former Oregon congressman.

== Works ==
- The Louisiana Purchase and Our Title West of the Rocky Mountains, with A Review of Annexation by the United States. Washington, DC: US Government Printing Office, 1898.
- "Early History of Southern Oregon," Quarterly of the Oregon Historical Society, vol. 17, no. 1 (March 1918), pp. 52–68. —Address to Oregon Historical Society, October 28, 1917.
- The Baltimore Colony and Pioneer Recollections. Coos Bay, OR: Baltimore Colony Centennial Committee, 1959.

== See also ==
- Benson Syndicate
- Land patent
- United States General Land Office
- Bureau of Land Management
- National Archives and Records Administration
- Mining
- Geological survey
- General Mining Act of 1872
- Surveying
- Cripple Creek, Colorado
- Public Land Survey System

== Footnotes ==
U.S. House of Representatives
Preceded by Melvin Clark George	Member of the U.S. House of Representatives from Oregon's at-large congressional district 1885–1893	Succeeded by None (district replaced by 1st district)
Preceded by None (district created by 1890 census)	Member of the U.S. House of Representatives from Oregon's 1st congressional district 1893–1897	Succeeded by Thomas H. Tongue
Preceded by Thomas H. Tongue	Member of the U.S. House of Representatives from Oregon's 1st congressional district 1903–1907	Succeeded by Willis C. Hawley
Political offices
Preceded by Silas W. Lamoreaux	Commissioner of the General Land Office; March 25, 1897 – January 26, 1903	Succeeded by William A. Richards
