= Stephen A. Douglas Puter =

American criminal and author

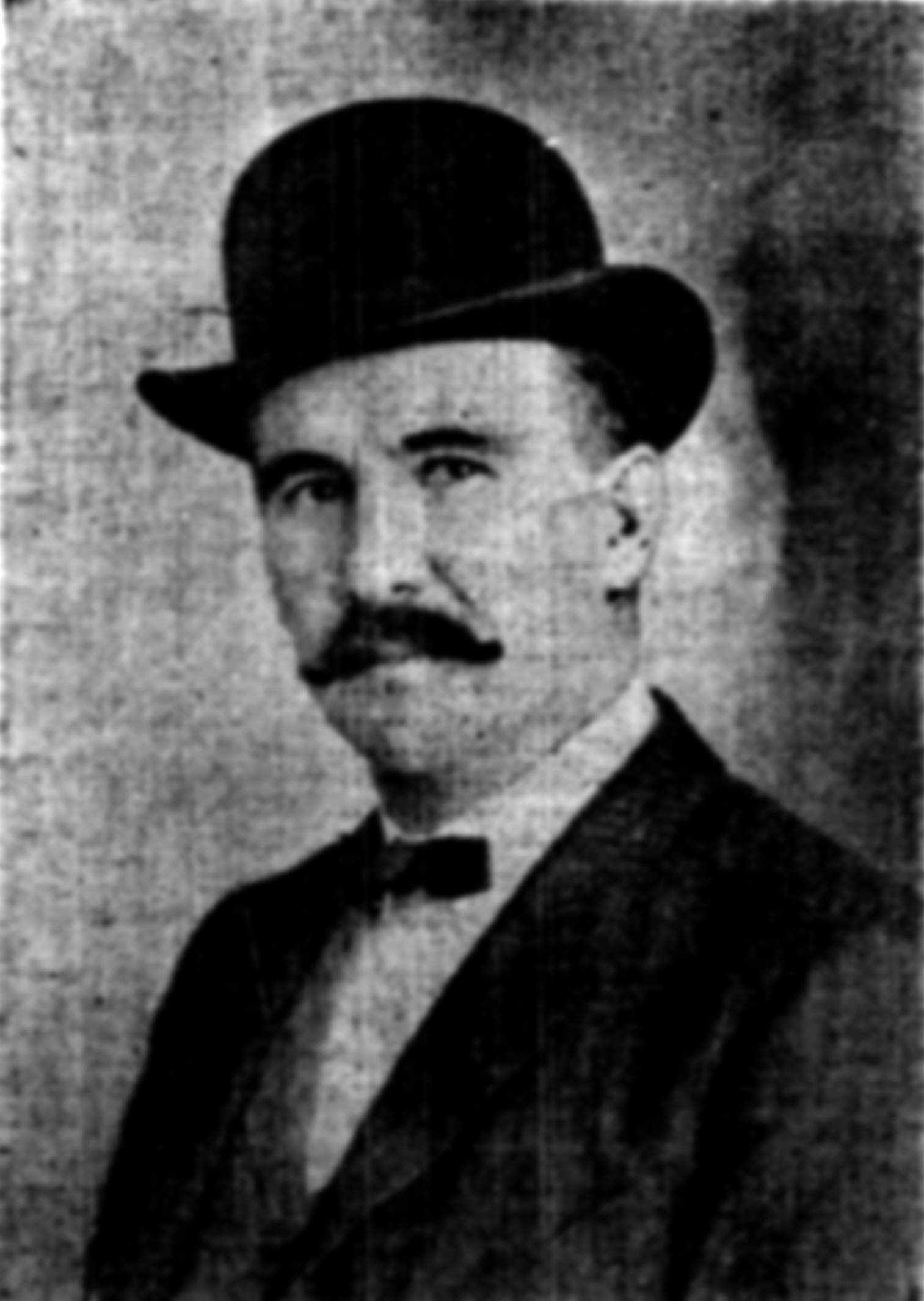
- Stephen A. Douglas Puter from the March 27, 1906 edition of the Morning Oregonian
- Born: January 6, 1857; Trinity County, California
- Died: May 10, 1931
- Occupations: Criminal and author
- Known for: Pardoned organizer of Oregon land fraud scandal

Stephen Arnold Douglas Puter (January 6, 1857 – May 10, 1931) was a criminal and author from Oregon, United States. After being convicted of land fraud, he lived as a fugitive for several months before being captured. He wrote a book after conviction, received a Presidential pardon, and later was convicted of mail fraud.

== Early life ==
Puter was born on January 6, 1857, in Trinity County, California, and moved with his family to Humboldt County, California, two years later. As a young man, he worked as a surveyor and a logger. He left California in 1888 and moved to Portland, Oregon.

== Oregon land fraud scandal ==
Early in the 20th century, Puter was instrumental in carrying out the Oregon land fraud scandal, which transferred tens of thousands of acres of federal lands given to the Oregon and California Railroad to private hands, ultimately benefiting large timber companies and some Oregon politicians, including U.S. Senators John H. Mitchell and Binger Hermann, who was later exonerated. Puter was considered the kingpin of the scandal. In 1902, he took his family to Berkeley, California. He was indicted early in 1905; allegations besides the land schemes included bribing then-Senator Mitchell $2,000.

Puter fled Oregon before being sentenced as had two of the other defendants. Oregon authorities declared their intention to apprehend him and his partner Horace G. McKinley anywhere in the world, and sent photographs through U. S. diplomatic channels. McKinley fled to China on a steamship; Puter escaped capture by U.S. Secret Service officers in an armed confrontation in Boston, Massachusetts, in March and was subsequently a fugitive for several months before being captured in late May 1906. The Alameda, California, police who apprehended him also discovered weapons in his rented room. After his capture and return to Oregon he served two years in the Multnomah County Jail. Puter objected to the fact that Mitchell had received a lighter sentence than himself, since Mitchell had participated in making the laws the two had broken.

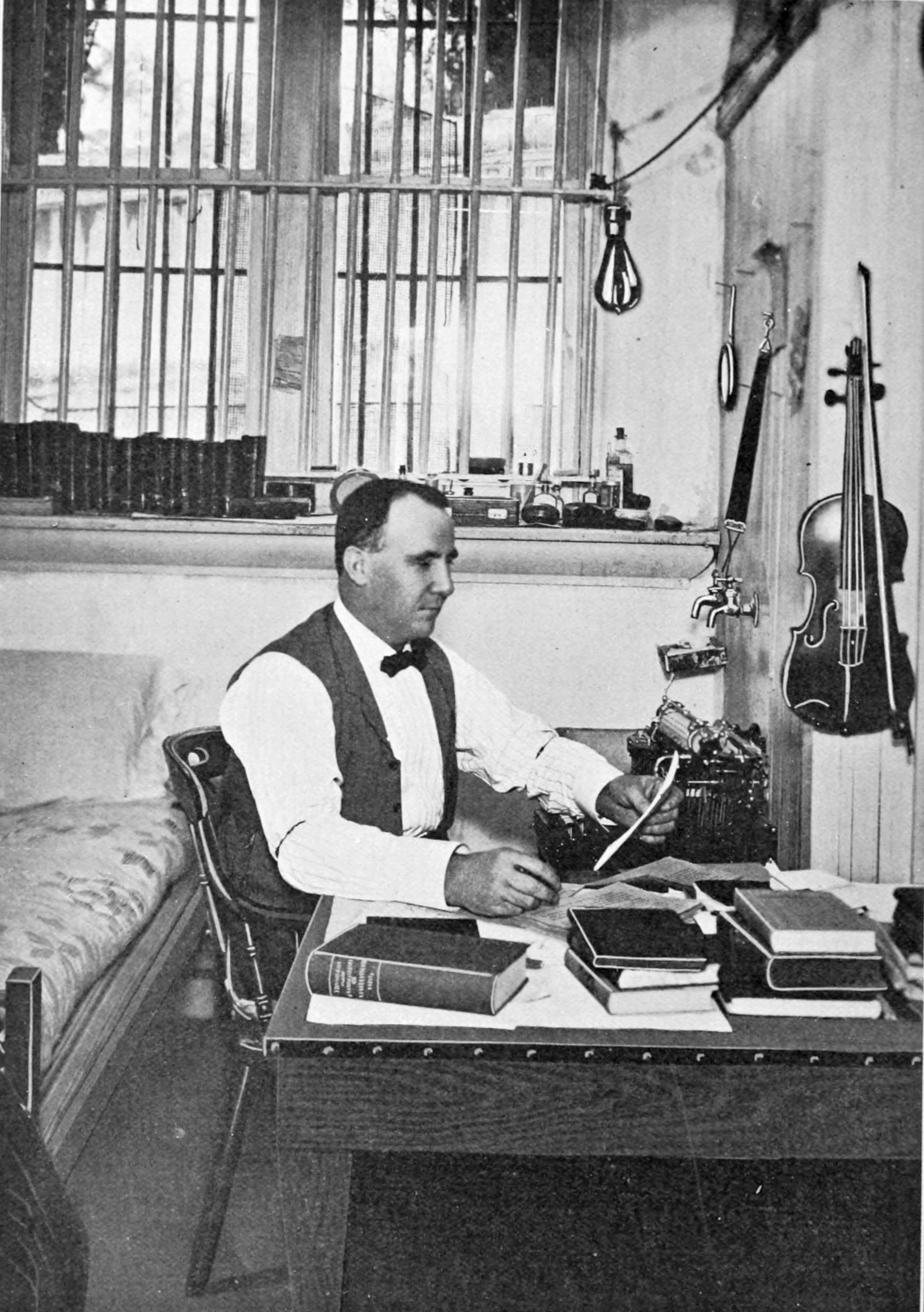
Puter writing in his cell.

In 1906, while incarcerated, Puter co-wrote the book Looters of the Public Domain with Horace Stevens, a former General Land Office clerk. In the detailed tell-all, Puter both confessed to and accused others of their role in the scandal, and in it were portraits of his co-conspirators and copies of documents confirming their criminal acts. In his book he wrote a clear statement of the scope of the scandal:

Thousands upon thousands of acres, which included the very cream of timber claims in Oregon and Washington, were secured by Eastern lumberman and capitalists,…and nearly all of the claims, to my certain knowledge, were fraudulently obtained.

The timber land scandals were not limited to Oregon. The California Redwood Company in Humboldt County had also been running a claim scheme to secure title to thousands of acres of redwood timberlands.

President Theodore Roosevelt pardoned Puter after he had served 18 months of his sentence so that he could turn state's evidence. Puter was able to keep much of the money he had acquired through the timber fraud. His testimony led to the indictment of Mitchell, Hermann and John N. Williamson, who made up three-fourths of Oregon's congressional delegation, as well as a number of other prominent Oregonians and federal officials. In 1907 he testified to having bribed a grand jury during the land schemes in Oregon.

== Later life and death ==
Puter's son, R. C. Puter, was charged with criminal negligence in 1915, after he allegedly hit and killed Mary Logan with his car in the San Francisco Bay Area. He was expected to be tried on a charge of manslaughter.

In July 1916, Stephen A. Douglas Puter was indicted, along with seven others (including his two sons and a son-in-law), for "Illegal Use of the Mails and Fraud" during the perpetration of the land fraud scandal. S. A. D. Puter, who was in New York at the time, declared himself the leader of those indicted, and insisted that they were innocent of any charges of fraud. He traveled by train to San Francisco, where he turned himself in. He and his sons were listed as residents of Berkeley, California; the son-in-law was from San Francisco.

Several years later, in what was described in an International News Service item as "the final echo of the Oregon land fraud cases," four of the eight co-defendants entered guilty pleas. They were fined; the highest amount, $1500, was assessed to S. A. D. Puter.

Puter died May 10, 1931, in Burlingame, California. He was survived by his wife, Sarah, and two daughters, Vivian McEwen and Gladys Jones, and his body was interred at Mount Olivet Cemetery in Colma, California.

== See also ==
- List of people pardoned or granted clemency by the president of the United States
