= John Hicklin Hall =

American politician

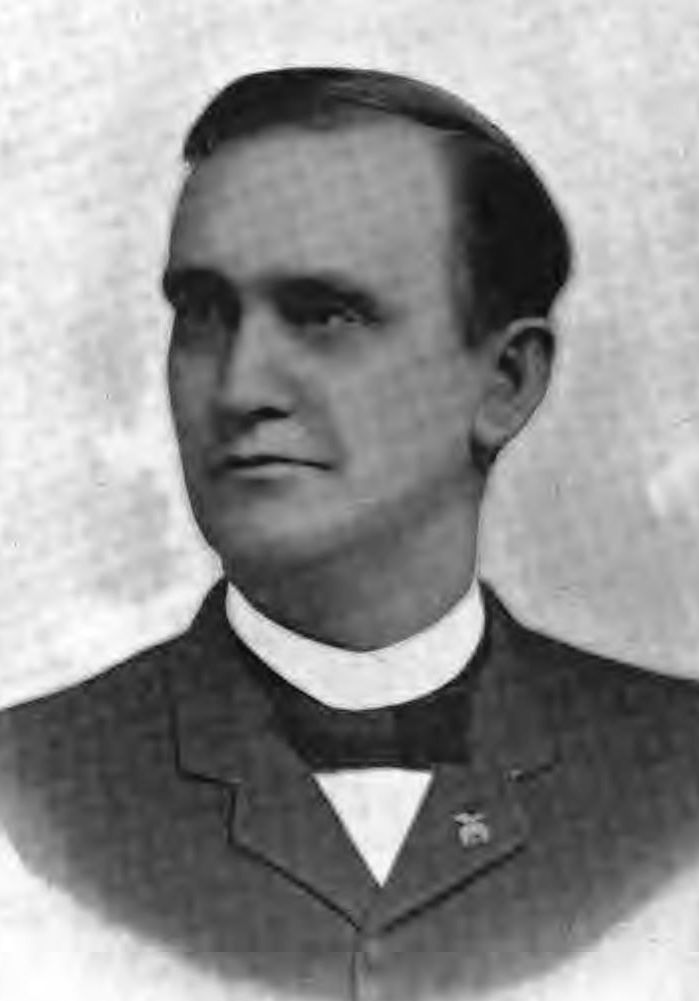
- Hall c. 1891–1893

Member of the Oregon House of Representatives
- In office 1891–1893
- Constituency: Multnomah County

United States District Attorney for Oregon
- In office November 1897 – December 31, 1904
- Nominated by: William McKinley

Personal details
- Born: July 17, 1854 Multnomah County, Oregon
- Died: July 27, 1937 (aged 83) Portland, Oregon
- Party: Republican
- Spouse(s): Olive I. Powell; Jessie E. Belcher

John Hicklin Hall (July 17, 1854 – July 27, 1937) was a politician and attorney in the U.S. state of Oregon. A native of the Portland area, he served in the Oregon House of Representatives in the early 1890s before appointment as the United States District Attorney for Oregon. As the federal prosecutor, he became involved in the Oregon land fraud scandal, in which several high-profile public officials conspired to defraud the government in acquiring land for a private entity. Hall was convicted, but subsequently pardoned, for failing to prosecute some of the participants.

Hall was also the father of Oregon governor John H. Hall.

== Early life ==
John Hall was born in Multnomah County, Oregon, east of the city of Portland on July 17, 1854. He was the son of Benjamin F. and Emily Hicklin Hall, though both parents died when he was ten, leaving him the family farm. Hall worked as a farm hand and for a railroad surveying crew while also receiving an education at both the Lafayette Academy and Portland High School. When he turned 21 he returned to the family farm to run it, and in 1877 was married to Olive I. Powell.

After getting married, the couple moved to Portland and opened a store, which he sold in 1885. Hall then read law for two years and passed the bar in October 1887. He then entered a legal partnership with W. E. Showers before appointment as a deputy district attorney in 1888 for Multnomah County. In 1890, he was elected to represent Multnomah County in the Oregon House of Representatives. A Republican, Hall served one two-year term, participating in the 1891 legislative session.

Hall was elevated to the position of chief deputy DA in 1892. He was married a second time December 25, 1895, to Jessie E. Belcher, and they had three children. In November 1897, Hall was appointed as the United States District Attorney for Oregon by U.S. President William McKinley.

== Oregon land fraud ==
In 1903, U.S. Attorney General Philander Knox appointed Francis J. Heney to assist Hall in investigating allegations of land fraud in Oregon in a series of trials that became known as the Oregon land fraud scandal. Hall was uncooperative in the investigation, and was removed from office by President Theodore Roosevelt on January 1, 1905.

In 1907, Heney put Hall on trial for failing to prosecute land companies engaging in fraudulent activities, and for using his knowledge of illegal activities to blackmail his political opponents. On February 8, 1908, a jury found Hall guilty of the charges.

== Later years ==
He was later pardoned by President William Howard Taft for his role in the land fraud scandal. Hall returned to private legal practice in Portland after being forced out of office. He also was involved with the banking industry, owned three farms, and was an investor in power generation projects in Deschutes County.

John Hicklin Hall died in Portland, Oregon, on July 27, 1937, at the age of 83 and was interred at River View Cemetery in Portland. His son, John Hubert Hall, was also active in Oregon politics, serving briefly as governor following the deaths of the first three elected officials in the state's line of succession.

== See also ==
- List of people pardoned or granted clemency by the president of the United States
