= Japanese Cemetery (Colma, California) =

Japanese cemetery in California, USA

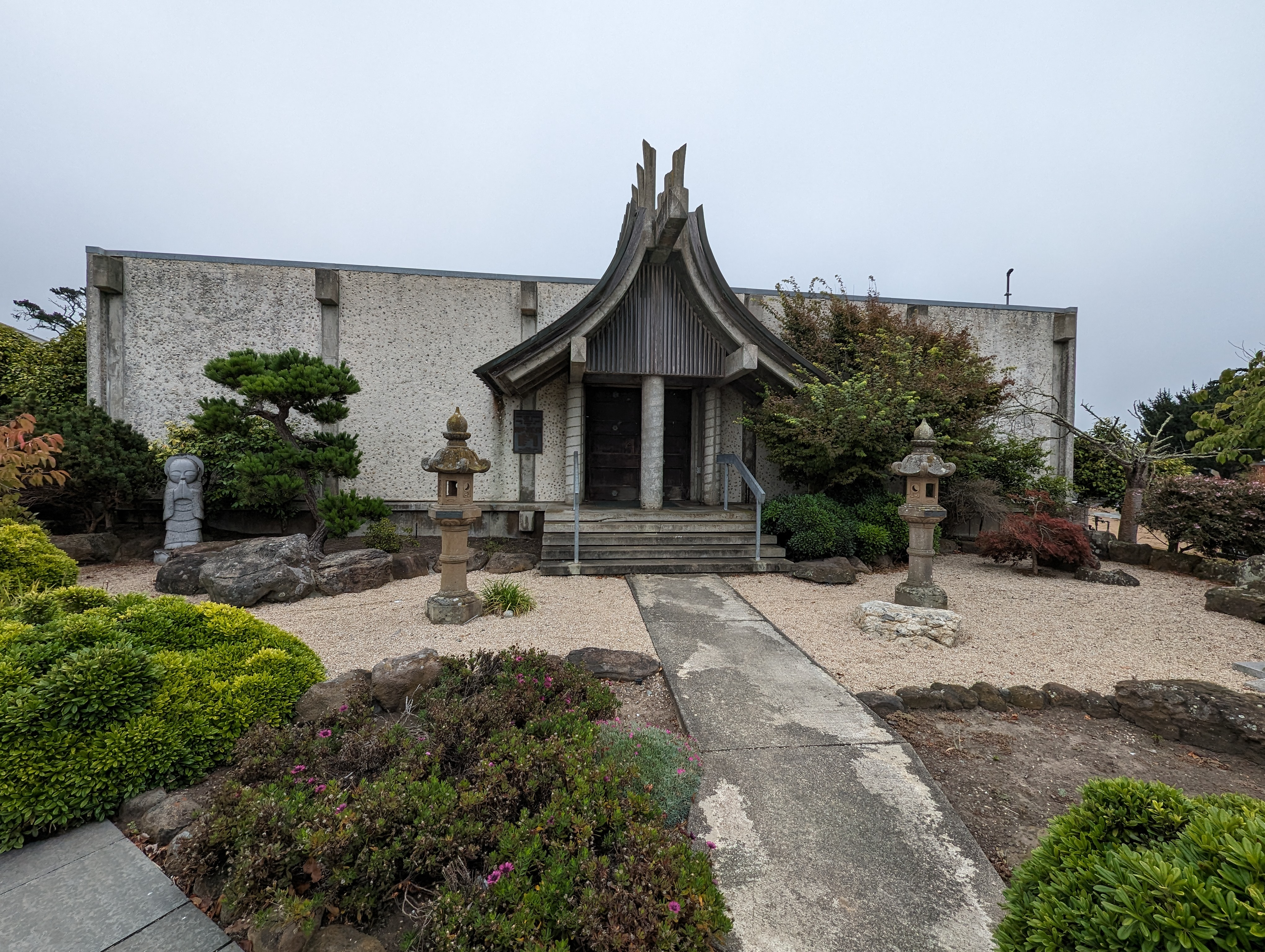
- Japanese Cemetery Columbarium, completed in 1963

Details
- Established: 1901
- Location: Colma, California
- Country: United States
- Coordinates: 37.683999°N 122.458100°W
- Type: Japanese
- Owned by: Jikei-kai Japanese Benevolent Society of California
- Find a Grave: Japanese Cemetery

Japanese Cemetery was founded in 1901 and is located at 1300 Hillside Boulevard in Colma, California. This cemetery has brought together the Japanese community in California and has worked with Buddhist, Shinto, and Christian religious organizations.

== History ==
In the beginning of the 20th century, most Japanese living in San Francisco were buried in either the Masonic Cemetery or the Laurel Hill Cemetery (formerly Lone Hill Cemetery), in the Lone Mountain neighborhood. In 1901, all new burials were forbidden in the city of San Francisco due to a law change. In 1901, the Jikei-kai Japanese Benevolent Society of California purchased 2 acres (0.81 ha) of land in Colma to create a cemetery, and some graves from Laurel Hill and Masonic Cemeteries in San Francisco were moved here. On March 17, 1903, Jōdo Shinshū cleric Rev. Nishijima Kakyuro officiated the opening ceremony for the cemetery.

In 1906, the Meiji-era Emperor of Japan provided a grant to help bury Japanese in California.

The site lacks the extensive landscaping typical of the other park-like cemeteries in Colma; most paths are paved with concrete or gravel, and a traditional Japanese garden lies just outside the entrance of the columbarium.

== Notable burials ==
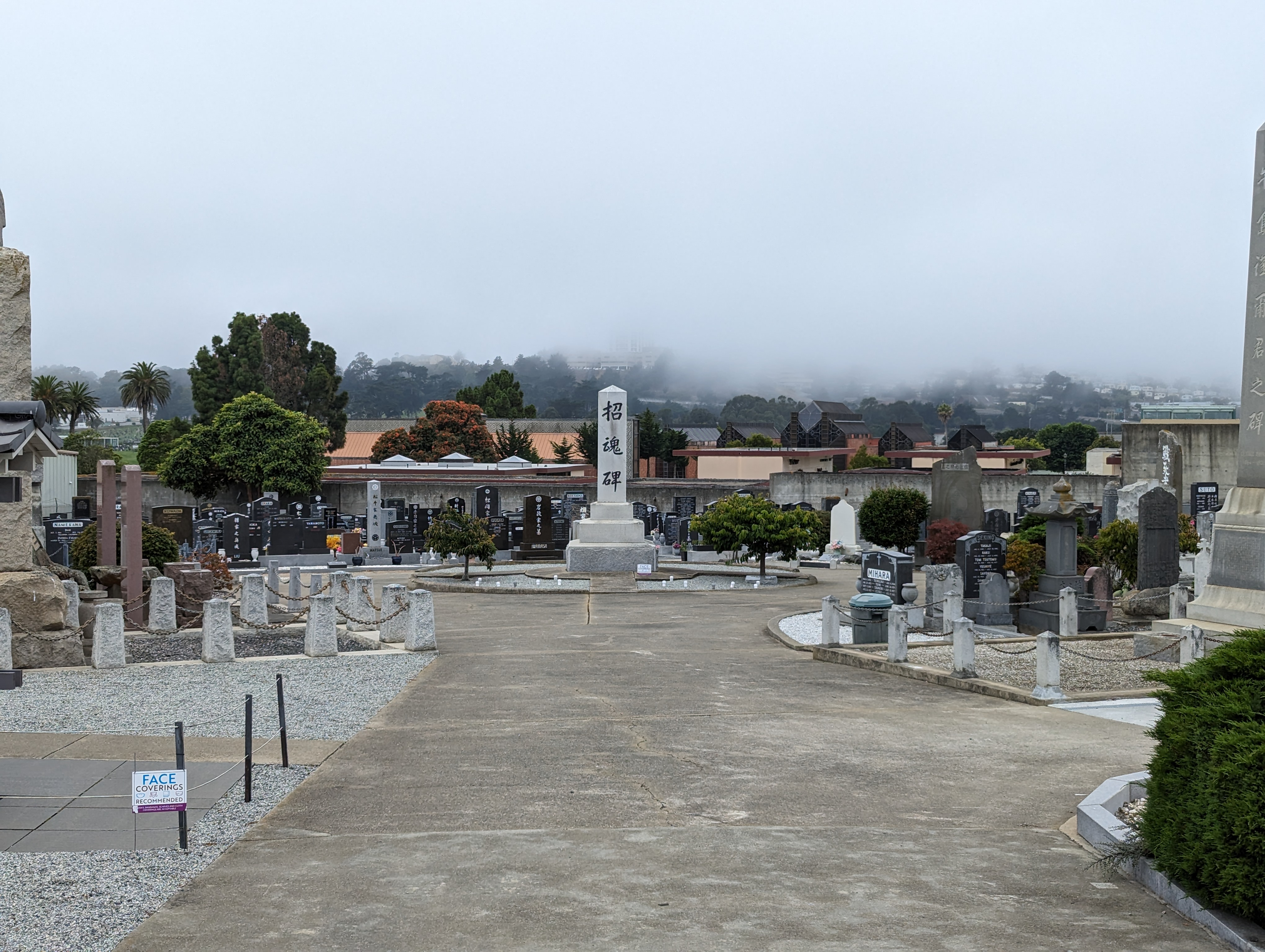
Hardscaped graves at Japanese Cemetery

The oldest graves appear to be from 1860 from the three crew members of the Japanese warship Kanrin Maru, which pre-dates the founding Japanese Cemetery of Colma. In 1860, these three Japanese sailors aboard the Kanrin Maru died during the first Japanese Embassy to the United States. The sailors had been buried at the Marine Hospital Cemetery (which closed in 1870) in San Francisco, then later transferred to Laurel Hill Cemetery, followed by a move to the Japanese Cemetery in Colma.

- Kyutaro Abiko (1865–1936), Japanese-born American businessman and newspaper editor; founder of Nichi Bei Times.
- Makoto Hagiwara (1854–1925), landscape designer and longtime manager of the Japanese tea garden at Golden Gate Park.
- Ayao Hattori (1863–1914), politician, pastor, and educator; sent to alleviate the anti-Japanese sentiment.
- Keisaburo Koda (1882–1964), businessperson, rice farmer, founder of Koda Farms.
- George Shima (1864–1926), businessperson, potato farmer, the first Japanese American millionaire.

== See also ==
- List of cemeteries in California
- Japanese cemeteries and cenotaphs
