= George Shima =

Japanese American businessman (1864–1926)

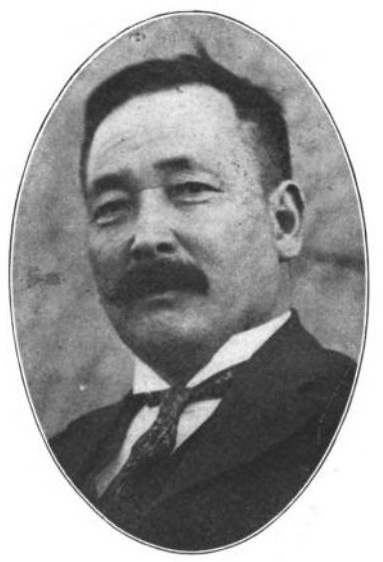
- Born: Ushijima Kinji (牛島謹爾); 1864; Kurume, Fukuoka, Tokugawa shogunate
- Died: March 27, 1926 (aged 61–62); Los Angeles, California, U.S.
- Resting place: Japanese Cemetery in Colma, California
- Occupation: Businessman
- Known for: Agriculture

George Shima (1864 – March 27, 1926) was a Japanese American businessman in California who became the first Japanese American millionaire. At one point, he produced about 85% of the state's potato crop, which earned him the nickname "The Potato King".

== Early life ==
Born Ushijima Kinji (牛島謹爾) in Kurume, Fukuoka, Japan, he entered a preliminary course at the Tokyo Commercial School (now Hitotsubashi University), but failed the entrance examination for the regular course. He emigrated to San Francisco in 1889 determined to learn English, the subject that gave him the most trouble on the exam.

== Career ==
Upon his arrival in San Francisco, he changed his name to George Shima. He first worked as a domestic servant, then became a migrant farm laborer in the Sacramento Delta for a while. Soon afterward, he turned his eye to management, when he began supplying Japanese farm workers to white farmers. By the late 1890s, he leased some land and began his own farming operations. He was successful enough to purchase some inexpensive swampland (considered undesirable by white American farmers) in the San Joaquin Delta. After draining and diking the land, he found that potatoes grew best in that type of soil, and using corporate management techniques and the latest agricultural technology, began to corner the market in potatoes. By 1913, he had 28,000 acres (113 km^{2}) in production and by 1920, he had 85% of the market share with his "Shima Fancy" brand, valued at more than $18 million ($289,285,714 today).

His business success did not bring him respite from racism, however. In 1909, while trying to purchase a home in Berkeley, he was actively opposed by real estate agents and other homeowners. Despite being the subject of such newspaper headlines as "Yellow Peril in College Town", Shima became active in the community, donating $500 to the local YMCA, and gradually won over his neighbors. Still, the opposition he encountered led him that same year to become the first president of the Japanese Association of America and to unsuccessfully fight the passing of the California Alien Land Law of 1913, which was written to prevent Asians from owning land. The Immigration Act of 1924 prevented immigration from Asia into the U.S. which lead to Shima losing his workforce. Shima decided to return to Japan, tired of the prejudice he faced in the U.S., but he died suddenly during his travels back to Japan.

== Death and legacy ==
In 1926, after a business trip to Los Angeles, he suffered a stroke and died. That same day he was awarded the Fourth Rank Order of the Rising Sun from the Emperor of Japan. He received the award from Hirohito, posthumously known as Emperor Shōwa. (Note: Although his father, the Emperor Taishō, was nominally on the throne until his death on December 25, 1926, Hirohito had served as regent to his mentally disabled father since 1921.) At his funeral, David Starr Jordan, the president of Stanford University, and James Rolph, the Mayor of San Francisco, both served as pallbearers. Shima is buried in the Japanese Cemetery in Colma, California. At the Japanese Cemetery, there is a monument in his honor.

The Shima Center at San Joaquin Delta College honors his legacy. Yoshinobu Hirotsu, a fellow resident of Shima's hometown of Kurume, also raised several hundred thousand yen to set up a life-sized monument to him in a park there in 1999.

== See also ==
- John P. Irish, activist in support of Japanese immigration. Shima was an honorary pallbearer at his funeral.
