= Pauline Eichberg =

- Born: April 22, 1839; Stuttgart, Württemberg, German Confederation
- Died: December 28, 1874 (aged 35); Baltimore, Maryland, United States
- Instrument: Piano
- Spouse: Alexander Weiller (m. 1861)

Pauline Weiller (née Eichberg; April 22, 1839 – December 28, 1874) was a German–American pianist.

== Biography ==
Pauline Eichberg was born in Stuttgart, Germany, in 1839. She was the eldest daughter of Leonore (née Seligsberg) and Moritz Eichberg, who served as a cantor in that city. The Eichberg family's five daughters, who also included soprano Julie Rosewald and harpist Bertha Eichberg, inherited musical talent from their parents.

Under the tutelage of Mathilde Ries, Pauline's musical abilities developed rapidly, and she performed publicly before reaching the age of ten. At the age of thirteen, she came to the attention of Anton Rubinstein, who introduced her to Giacomo Meyerbeer. Through Meyerbeer's influence, Pauline was accepted to continue her musical education at the Leipzig Conservatory, then under the direction of Ignaz Moscheles. Subsequently, she joined Rubinstein for a performance season in Baden.

Eichberg's greatest accomplishments as a pianist were as a performer of Frédéric Chopin's compositions. Her technical prowess was marked by flawless and elegant execution, as well as an exceptional musical memory.

In 1859, she relocated to New York City, where she pursued a career as a music teacher. Two years later, she married Alexander Weiller of Baltimore. She died at the age of 35 on December 28, 1874, upon giving birth to their fourth child.
