= Junipero Serra Landfill =

Solid waste disposal site in California, United States

Coordinates: 37.678°N 122.467°W

The Junipero Serra Landfill was a solid waste disposal site in Colma, California, United States. The site was closed in 1983 and ultimately developed by commercial land uses, collectively known as the Metro Center. The original commercial use built on the closed landfill site was a Home Depot retail store and parking lot constructed over 1,348 piles, each driven approximately 160 ft (49 m) deep into the landfill (Bay Area Rapid Transit District, 2006). The site also required the engineering of a landfill gas control system, since, when organic solid waste aerobically decomposes, it produces methane gas, which is explosive and toxic in large concentrations. SCS Engineers was presented an award by the Solid Waste Association of North America for the design of the closure methane capture system at this landfill. (SCS Engineers, 2002).

The Junipero Serra Landfill is situated on the San Francisco Peninsula in the eastern foothills of the northwest trending Santa Cruz Mountain Range. The foothills and eastern flanks of the range are composed largely of poorly consolidated Pliocene-Quaternary freshwater and shallow marine sediments that include the Colma and Merced Formations. (Earth Metrics, 1989) (Hart, 1985) The Junipero Serra Landfill began operations in the year 1956 and accepted primarily commercial solid wastes.

== See also ==
- Landfills in the United States
