= Colma, California =

Town in California, United States

- Town
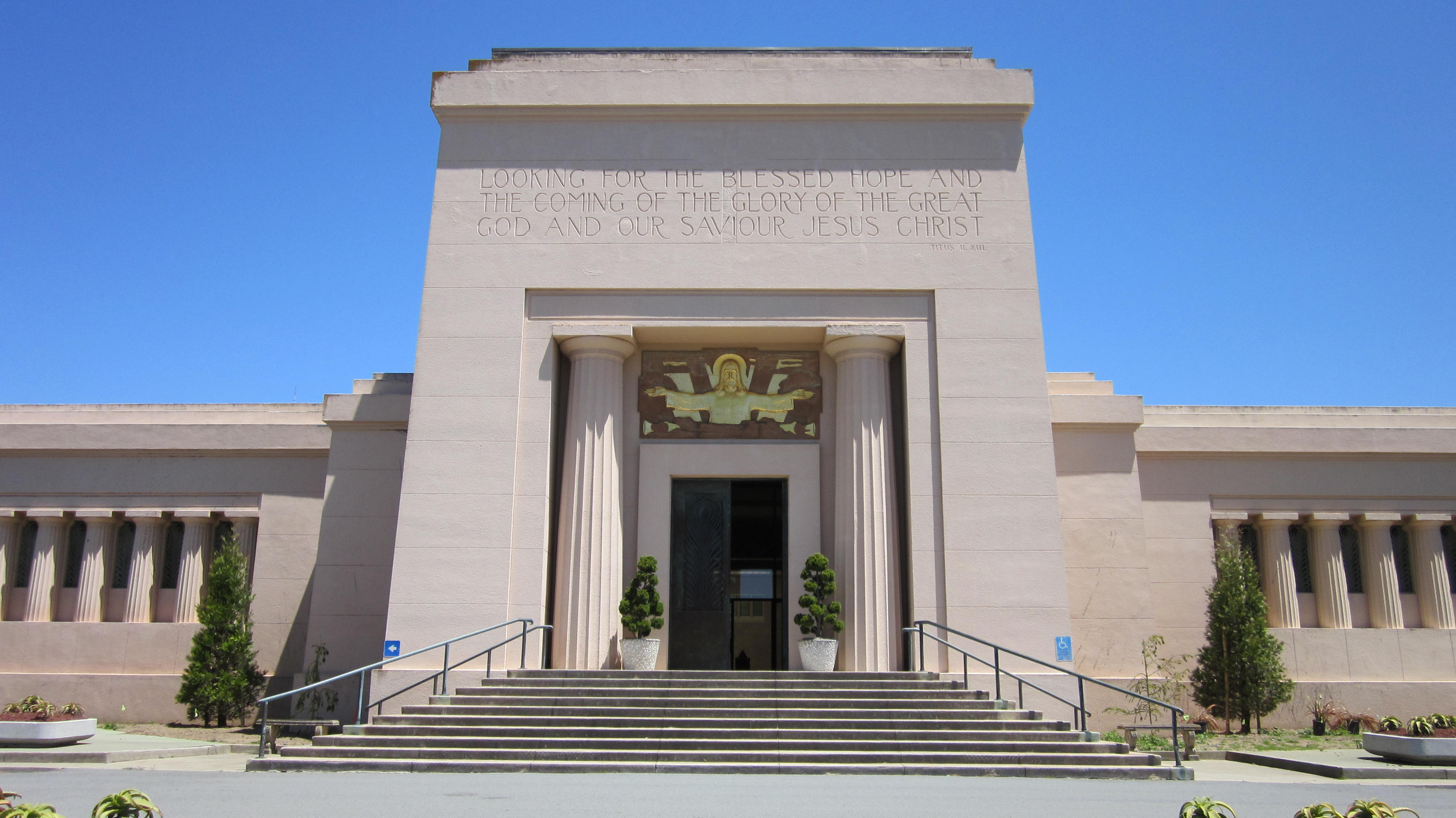
- Holy Cross Cemetery

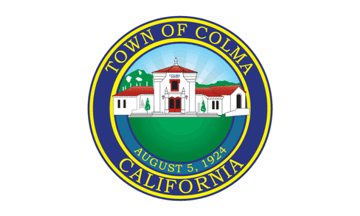
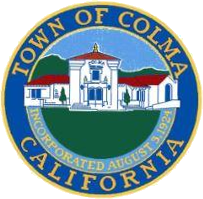
- Flag Seal
- Motto: "It's great to be alive in Colma"
- Interactive map of Colma, California
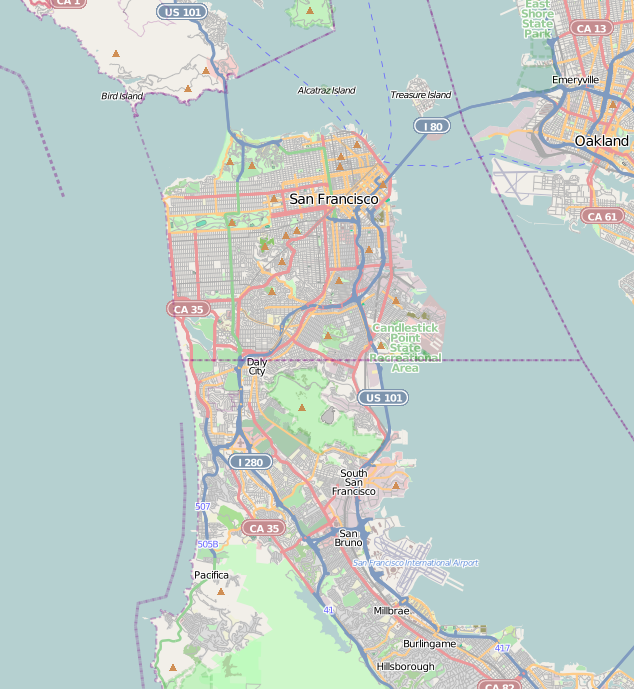
- Location of Colma Colma, California (San Francisco Bay Area) Colma, California (California) Colma, California (the United States)
- Coordinates: 37°40′44″N 122°27′20″W
- Country: United States
- State: California
- County: San Mateo
- Incorporated as "Lawndale": August 5, 1924
- Name changed to "Colma": November 17, 1941

Government
  - Mayor: Joanne del Rosario
  - City Manager: Daniel Barros

Area
  - Total: 1.89 sq mi (4.90 km^{2})
  - Land: 1.89 sq mi (4.90 km^{2})
  - Water: 0 sq mi (0.00 km^{2}) 0%
- Elevation: 121 ft (37 m)

Population (2020)
  - Total: 1,507
  - Density: 797.1/sq mi (307.78/km^{2})
- United States Census Bureau
- Time zone: UTC−8 (PST)
  - Summer (DST): UTC−7 (PDT)
- ZIP Code: 94014
- Area code: 650
- FIPS code: 06-14736
- GNIS feature ID: 1658303
- Website: www.colma.ca.gov

Colma (Ohlone for 'springs') is a small incorporated town in San Mateo County, California, United States, on the San Francisco Peninsula in the San Francisco Bay Area. The population was 1,507 at the 2020 census. The town was founded as a necropolis in 1924.

With most of Colma's land dedicated to cemeteries, the population of the dead—not specifically known but speculated to be around 1.5 million—outnumbers that of the living by a ratio of nearly a thousand to one. This has led to Colma being called "the City of the Silent" and has given rise to a humorous motto, formerly featured on the city's website: "It's great to be alive in Colma".

== Etymology ==
The most commonly proposed origin of the name "Colma" is the Ohlone word meaning "springs" or "many springs".

There are several other proposed origins of Colma. Erwin Gudde's California Place Names states seven possible sources for the town's name: William T. Coleman (a local landowner), Thomas Coleman (a local resident), misspelling of Colmar in France, misspelling of Colima in Mexico, a re-spelling of an ancient Uralic word meaning death, a reference to James Macpherson's Songs of Selma, and two Ohlone possibilities, one meaning "moon" and the other "springs".

Before 1872, Colma was designated as "Station" or "School House Station," the name of its post office in 1869.

== History ==
The community of Colma was formed in the 19th century as a collection of homes and small businesses along El Camino Real and the adjacent San Francisco and San Jose Railroad line. Several churches, including Holy Angels Catholic Church, were founded in these early years. The community founded its own fire district, which serves the unincorporated area of Colma north of the town limits, as well as the area that became a town in 1924.

Heinrich (Henry) von Kempf moved his wholesale nursery here in the early part of the 20th century, from the land where the Palace of Fine Arts currently sits. The business was growing, and thus required more space for von Kempf's plants and trees. Von Kempf then began petitioning to turn the Colma community into an agricultural township. He succeeded and became the town of Colma's first treasurer.

In the early 20th century, Colma was the site of many major boxing events. Middleweight world champion Stanley Ketchel fought six bouts at the Mission Street Arena in Colma, including two world middleweight title bouts against Billy Papke and a world heavyweight title bout against Jack Johnson.

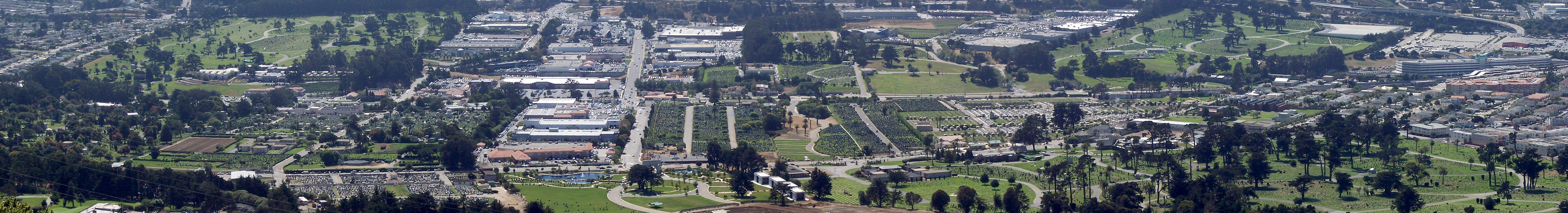
A panoramic view of Colma, California, looking down from San Bruno Mountain

=== San Francisco cemetery relocations ===
Colma became the site for numerous cemeteries after San Francisco outlawed new interments within its city limits in 1900, then evicted most existing cemeteries in 1912. In the 1910s, many of the roads to Colma were not maintained. Bodies were transported by street cars in San Francisco down Valencia Street in the Mission District; which resulted in many mortuaries and funeral homes in this location for quick access to Colma. Approximately 150,000 bodies were moved between 1920 and 1941, at a cost of $10 per grave and marker. Many of the remains in Colma came from the Lone Mountain Cemetery complex. Those for whom no one paid the fee were reburied in mass graves, and the markers were recycled in various San Francisco public works. Some examples include drain gutters at Buena Vista Park and bolstering breakwater near the St. Francis Yacht Club. They can be seen at low tide on Ocean Beach. The completion of the relocation was delayed until after World War II. The main rail line between San Francisco and San Jose running through Colma had been bypassed by the Bayshore Cutoff, completed in 1907 and providing a route closer to the San Francisco Bay shoreline, and the former main line was repurposed as a branch line to move coffins to Colma. Decades later, the right-of-way for the branch line through Colma was purchased by BART for use in the San Francisco International Airport extension project.

An early effort to incorporate in 1903 was condemned by the San Francisco Call as "a scheme whereby the town of Colma is to be made a plague spot of vice" to benefit gamblers and crooked politicians. The Town of Lawndale was incorporated in 1924, primarily at the behest of the cemetery owners with the cooperation of the handful of residents who lived closest to the cemeteries. The residential and business areas immediately to the north continued to be known as Colma. As another California city named Lawndale already existed, in Los Angeles County, the post office retained the Colma designation, and the town changed its name back to Colma in 1941.

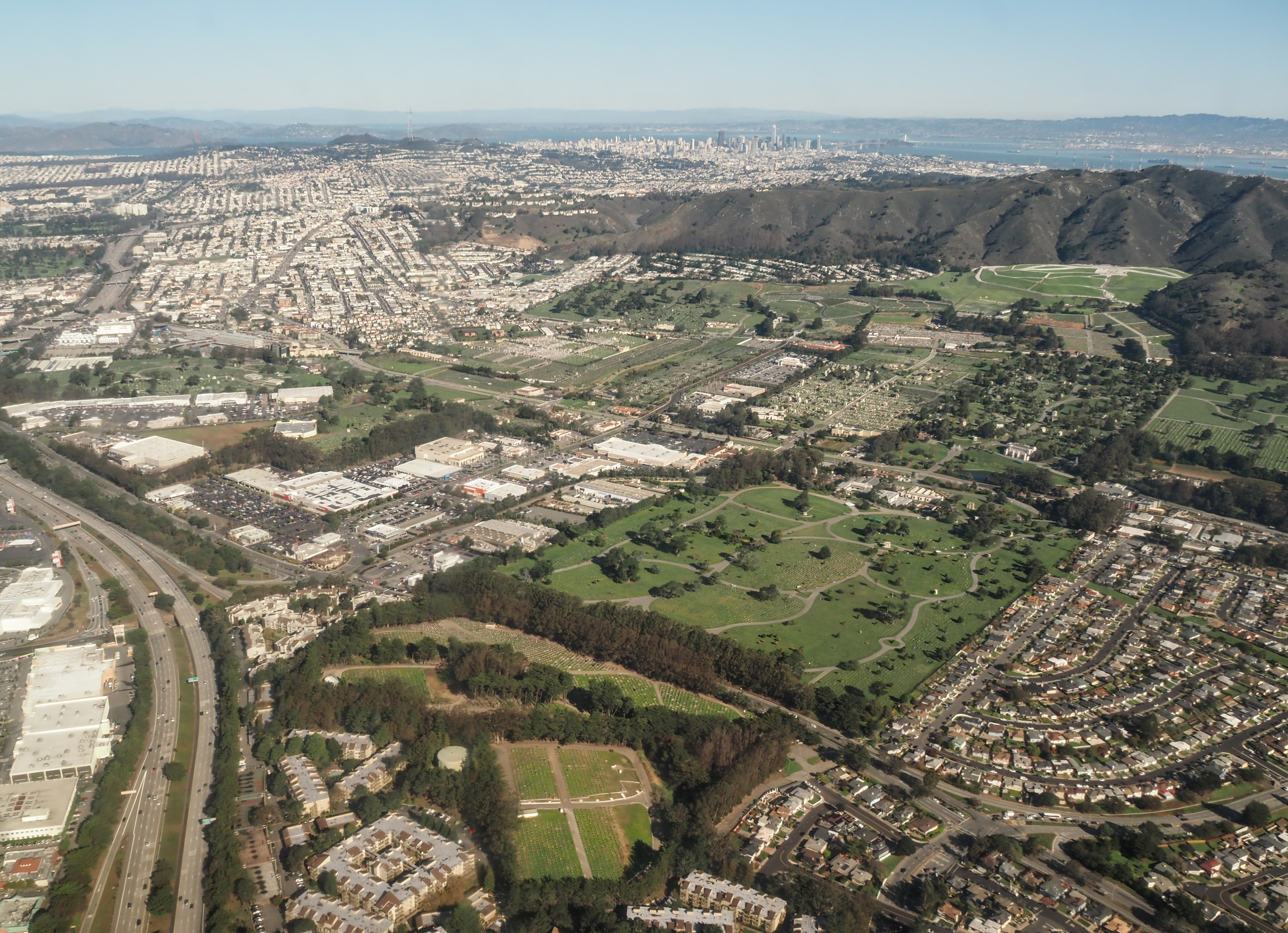
Aerial view of Colma, from the south; San Francisco is visible in the distance at upper right and I-280 runs north in the lower left corner. The prominent rectangular green space in the foreground is the western campus of Cypress Lawn Memorial Park, acquired in the early 1900s.

=== Notable interments ===
Selected locations in Colma, California
- Cemeteries
- Shopping/Retail
- Transportation
- Points of interest
1 Colma (BART)
2 Japanese Cemetery
3 Woodlawn Memorial Park Cemetery
4 Eternal Home Cemetery
5 Italian Cemetery
6 Colma Historical Park and Community Center
7 Olivet Gardens (Mount Olivet)
8 Serbian Cemetery
9 280 Metro Center
10 Greenlawn Memorial Park and Greek Orthodox Memorial Park
11 Serramonte Boulevard / Serramonte Auto Row
12 Hills of Eternity Memorial Park and Home of Peace Cemetery
13 Serra Center
14 Cypress Lawn Memorial Park
15 Hoy Sun Ning Yung Cemetery and Chinese Christian Cemetery
16 Holy Cross Cemetery

Many, if not most, of the well-known people who died in San Francisco since the first cemeteries opened there have been buried or reburied in Colma, with an additional large number of such burials in Oakland's Mountain View Cemetery. Some notable people interred in Colma include:

- Cypress Lawn Memorial Park
  - William Henry Crocker, business magnate
  - Charles de Young, San Francisco Chronicle founder
  - Phineas Gage, famous 19th-century medical curiosity
  - Edward Gilbert, California politician and co-founder of the Alta California
  - William Randolph Hearst, newspaper tycoon
  - Ed Lee, first Asian American Mayor of San Francisco
  - Willie McCovey, Major League Baseball Hall of Famer
  - John McLaren, horticulturist
  - Turk Murphy, jazz musician and bandleader
- Hills of Eternity Memorial Park and Home of Peace Cemetery (side-by-side Jewish cemeteries, serving different congregations)
  - Wyatt Earp is buried next to his wife, Josephine Marcus Earp
  - Julie Rosewald, America's first female cantor
  - Levi Strauss, denim trouser pioneer
  - Alice B. Toklas is not buried in Colma, though there is a large Toklas cenotaph for her and markers there for some of her relatives
- Holy Cross Cemetery
  - Joseph Alioto, San Francisco mayor
  - Jimmy Britt, lightweight boxer
  - Pat Brown, 32nd governor of California
  - Beniamino Bufano, sculptor, noted for peace monuments and other statues
  - Frankie Crosetti, New York Yankees shortstop
  - Joe DiMaggio, Yankees center fielder
  - Abigail Folger, coffee heiress and Manson murder victim
  - A.P. Giannini, Bank of America founder
  - Vince Guaraldi, jazz musician
  - Capt. Michael A. Healy, United States Revenue Cutter Service Officer, and first man of African-American descent to command a ship of the United States government.
  - James D. Phelan, senator
- Woodlawn Memorial Park Cemetery
  - Thomas Henry Blythe, developer of Palo Verde Valley
  - Henry Miller, California cattle rancher
  - Emperor Norton, a late-1800s San Francisco celebrity known as "Emperor of these United States and Protector of Mexico"
  - José Sarria, LGBT political activist who styled himself "The Widow Norton" in reference to Norton
- Eternal Home Cemetery (Jewish Cemetery)
  - Bill Graham, music promoter
- Greek Orthodox Memorial Park
  - George Christopher, San Francisco mayor
- Serbian Cemetery
  - Boris Pash, Russian-American military intelligence officer
  - Gregory Udicki, Serbian Orthodox Bishop of the Diocese of Western America
- Greenlawn Memorial Cemetery
  - James Rolph, San Francisco mayor and 27th governor of California
- Japanese Cemetery
  - George Shima, businessperson

== Businesses ==
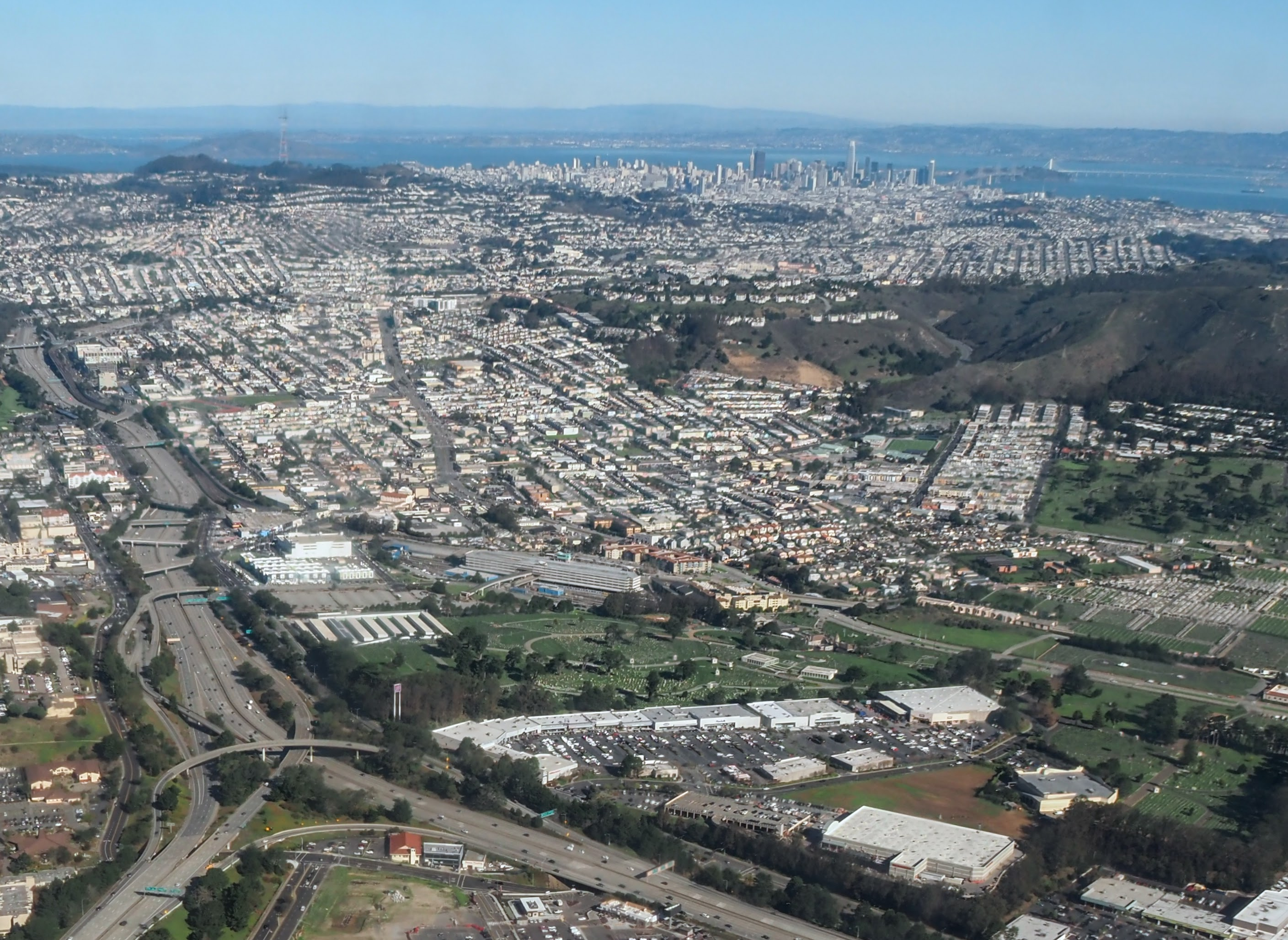
Aerial view of Colma, facing north; 280 Metro Center is in the lower center, adjacent to Woodlawn (to the north) and Greenlawn (to the east)

Originally, Colma's residents were primarily employed in occupations related to the many cemeteries in the town. Since the 1980s, however, Colma has become more diversified, and a variety of retail businesses and automobile dealerships has brought more sales tax revenue to the town government. In 1986, 280 Metro Center opened for business in Colma; it is now recognized as the world's first power center.

Cemeteries in Colma
Name	Image	Founded	Community	Size	Notes
Tung Sen		?	Chinese	?	These four cemeteries are within the city limits of Daly City, separated from the western campus of Cypress Lawn by Junipero Serra Boulevard.
Hoy Sun		?	Chinese	?	These four cemeteries are within the city limits of Daly City, separated from the western campus of Cypress Lawn by Junipero Serra Boulevard.
Chinese Christian		?	Chinese	?	These four cemeteries are within the city limits of Daly City, separated from the western campus of Cypress Lawn by Junipero Serra Boulevard.
Russian Sectarian		?	Russian	?	These four cemeteries are within the city limits of Daly City, separated from the western campus of Cypress Lawn by Junipero Serra Boulevard.
Holy Cross		Jun 3, 1887	Roman Catholic	?	Holy Cross Mausoleum, designed by John McQuarrie, is the resting site for the men who have served as Archbishop of San Francisco, including Joseph Sadoc Alemany, Patrick William Riordan, Edward Joseph Hanna, John Joseph Mitty, and Joseph Thomas McGucken.
Home of Peace		Jan 1, 1889	Jewish	20 acres (8.1 ha)	Occupies the northern half of the site
Hills of Eternity		Jan 1, 1889	Jewish	20 acres (8.1 ha)	Occupies the southern half of the site
Salem		Dec 20, 1891	Jewish	17 acres (6.9 ha)	
Cypress Lawn		1892	Non-sectarian	148 acres (60 ha)	Split into two campuses straddling El Camino Real: the 47-acre (19 ha) eastern (1892) and the 101-acre (41 ha) western (1901).
Mount Olivet		1896	Non-sectarian	65 acres (26 ha)	Renamed to Olivet Memorial Park. Acquired by Cypress Lawn in 2020.
Italian		1899	Italian	35 acres (14 ha)	
Serbian		1901	Christian Orthodox	16 acres (6.5 ha)	
Japanese		Jun 1901	Japanese	2 acres (0.81 ha)	
Eternal Home		Jul 1901	Jewish	25 acres (10 ha)	Also hosts the Jewish Community Memory Garden, adjacent to the children's section of the cemetery.
Greenlawn		1903	Non-sectarian	47 acres (19 ha)	Site purchased in 1903 by the directors of the Independent Order of Odd Fellows cemetery in San Francisco using allegedly embezzled funds, resulting in the disavowal of the site by the IOOF Grand Lodge.
Woodlawn		Oct 29, 1904	Non-sectarian	92 acres (37 ha)	Originally 47 acres (19 ha)
Sunset View		1907	Non-sectarian	?	Paupers' burial site; closed in 1951. Site now used for Cypress Hills Golf Course.
Greek Orthodox		1935	Eastern Orthodox	8 acres (3.2 ha)	Consecrated April 1936.
Pets Rest		1947	Pet	5 acres (2.0 ha)	
Hoy Sun		1988	Chinese	8 acres (3.2 ha)	Acquired from Cypress Hills Golf Course when the course shrank from 18 to 9 holes.
Golden Hills		Feb 23, 1994	Chinese	14 acres (5.7 ha)	Acquired from Cypress Hills Golf Course when the course shrank from 18 to 9 holes.

== Geography and geology ==
According to the United States Census Bureau, the town has a total area of 1.9 mi^{2} (4.9 km^{2}), all land. The town's 17 cemeteries comprise approximately 73% of the town's land area. It borders Daly City (to the north and west, separated by Junipero Serra Boulevard), South San Francisco (to the south, separated by Arlington, Mission, and Lawndale), and San Bruno Mountain State Park (to the east).

Colma is situated on the San Francisco Peninsula at the highest point of the Merced Valley, a gap between San Bruno Mountain and the northernmost foothills of the Santa Cruz Mountain Range. The foothills and eastern flanks of the range are composed largely of poorly consolidated Pliocene-Quaternary freshwater and shallow marine sediments that include the Colma and Merced Formations, recent slope wash, ravine fill, colluvium, and alluvium. These surficial deposits unconformably overlay the much older Jurassic to Cretaceous-aged Franciscan Assemblage. The Junipero Serra Landfill, which closed in 1983 and extended approximately 135 ft (41 m) deep, was developed and reopened as the 260,000 sq ft (24,000 m^{2}) mixed-use Metro Center.

Colma Creek flows through the city as it makes its way from San Bruno Mountain to San Francisco Bay.

== Transportation ==
BART has two stations serving Colma: Colma, at the northern border near Daly City, and South San Francisco, just across the southern border. In addition, SamTrans buses serve the city with public transportation.

There are three primary north-south roads for automobile and truck traffic through Colma; from west to east, they are Junipero Serra Boulevard, El Camino Real, and Hillside Boulevard. They are connected approximately through the center of Colma by Serramonte Boulevard.

== Government ==
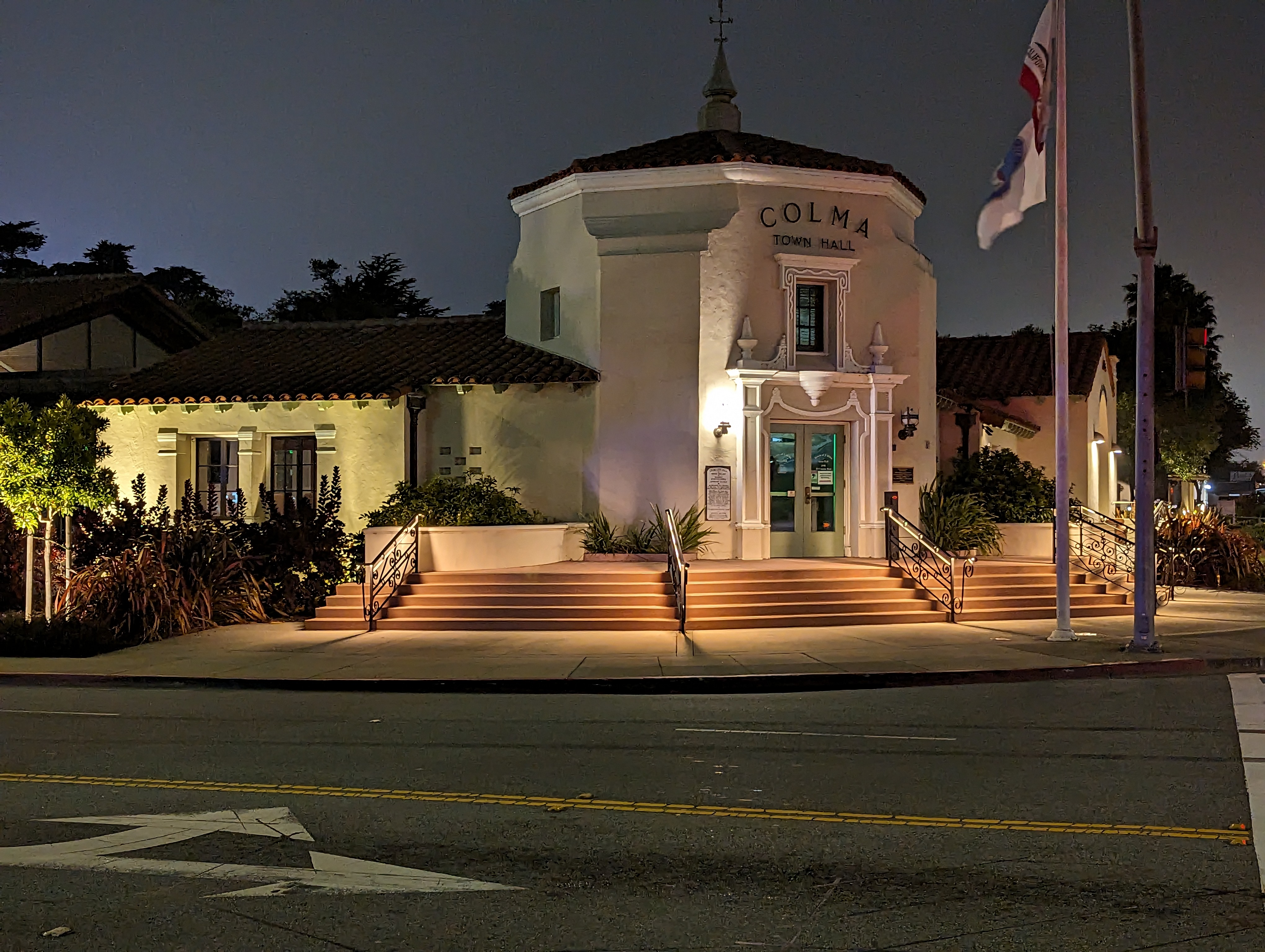
Colma Town Hall, at the intersection of El Camino Real and Serramonte Blvd.

In the California State Legislature, Colma is in the 11th senatorial district, represented by Democrat Scott Wiener, and in the 19th Assembly district, represented by Democrat Catherine Stefani. In the United States House of Representatives, Colma is in California's 15th congressional district, represented by Democrat Kevin Mullin.

== Education ==
Colma has one private school, Holy Angels School, a Catholic school for preschool through 8th grade.

Colma belongs to the Jefferson Elementary School District, which has two schools in Colma: Garden Village Elementary (grades K–5) and Benjamin Franklin Intermediate (grades 6–8). High school students typically attend Westmoor High School in the Jefferson Union High School District.

== Demographics ==
Historical population
Census	Pop.	Note	%±
1880	188		—
1930	369		—
1940	354		−4.1%
1950	297		−16.1%
1960	500		68.4%
1970	537		7.4%
1980	395		−26.4%
1990	1,103		179.2%
2000	1,191		8.0%
2010	1,792		50.5%
2020	1,507		−15.9%
U.S. Decennial Census; 1860–1870 1880-1890; 1900 1910 1920; 1930 1940 1950; 1960 1970 1980; 1990 2000 2010; 2020

Informally, as of 2006 Colma had "1,500 aboveground residents ... and 1.5 million underground".

=== Racial and ethnic composition ===
Colma town, California – Racial and ethnic composition Note: the US Census treats Hispanic/Latino as an ethnic category. This table excludes Latinos from the racial categories and assigns them to a separate category. Hispanics/Latinos may be of any race.
Race / Ethnicity (NH = Non-Hispanic)	Pop 2000	Pop 2010	Pop 2020	% 2000	% 2010	% 2020
White alone (NH)	330	360	307	27.71%	20.09%	20.37%
Black or African American alone (NH)	11	46	50	0.92%	2.57%	3.32%
Native American or Alaska Native alone (NH)	0	2	4	0.00%	0.11%	0.27%
Asian alone (NH)	280	597	442	23.51%	33.31%	29.33%
Native Hawaiian or Pacific Islander alone (NH)	3	8	3	0.25%	0.45%	0.20%
Other race alone (NH)	1	15	13	0.08%	0.84%	0.86%
Mixed race or Multiracial (NH)	43	56	67	3.61%	3.13%	4.45%
Hispanic or Latino (any race)	523	708	621	43.91%	39.51%	41.21%
Total	1,191	1,792	1,507	100.00%	100.00%	100.00%

=== 2020 census ===
As of the 2020 census, Colma had a population of 1,507. The population density was 796.9 inhabitants per square mile (307.7/km^{2}). The median age was 41.8 years. The age distribution was 302 people (20.0%) under the age of 18, 116 people (7.7%) aged 18 to 24, 378 people (25.1%) aged 25 to 44, 430 people (28.5%) aged 45 to 64, and 281 people (18.6%) who were 65 years of age or older. For every 100 females, there were 103.6 males, and for every 100 females age 18 and over there were 99.8 males.

The census reported that 1,450 people (96.2% of the population) lived in households, 26 (1.7%) lived in non-institutionalized group quarters, and 31 (2.1%) were institutionalized. Colma's population was 100.0% urban and 0.0% rural.

There were 509 households, out of which 192 (37.7%) had children under the age of 18 living in them, 224 (44.0%) were married-couple households, 32 (6.3%) were cohabiting couple households, 127 (25.0%) had a female householder with no partner present, and 126 (24.8%) had a male householder with no partner present. 110 households (21.6%) were one person, and 49 (9.6%) were one person aged 65 or older. The average household size was 2.85. There were 353 families (69.4% of all households).

There were 526 housing units at an average density of 278.2 units per square mile (107.4 units/km^{2}), of which 509 (96.8%) were occupied. Of these, 247 (48.5%) were owner-occupied and 262 (51.5%) were occupied by renters. Of all housing units, 3.2% were vacant; the homeowner vacancy rate was 0.8%, and the rental vacancy rate was 2.2%.

Racial composition as of the 2020 census
Race	Number	Percent
White	347	23.0%
Black or African American	60	4.0%
American Indian and Alaska Native	21	1.4%
Asian	460	30.5%
Native Hawaiian and Other Pacific Islander	6	0.4%
Some other race	368	24.4%
Two or more races	245	16.3%

=== Income and poverty ===
In 2023, the US Census Bureau estimated that the median household income was $121,488, and the per capita income was $49,693. About 8.6% of families and 9.5% of the population were below the poverty line.

=== 2010 census ===
The 2010 United States census reported that Colma had a population of 1,792. The population density was 938.6 inhabitants per square mile (362.4/km^{2}). The racial makeup of Colma was 620 (34.6%) White, 59 (3.3%) African American, 7 (0.4%) Native American, 619 (34.5%) Asian, 9 (0.5%) Pacific Islander, 366 (20.4%) from other races, and 112 (6.3%) from two or more races. Hispanic or Latino of any race were 708 persons (39.5%).

The Census reported that 1,763 people (98.4% of the population) lived in households, 0 (0%) lived in non-institutionalized group quarters, and 29 (1.6%) were institutionalized.

There were 564 households, out of which 217 (38.5%) had children under the age of 18 living in them, 271 (48.0%) were opposite-sex married couples living together, 110 (19.5%) had a female householder with no husband present, 42 (7.4%) had a male householder with no wife present. There were 44 (7.8%) unmarried opposite-sex partnerships, and 8 (1.4%) same-sex married couples or partnerships. 91 households (16.1%) were made up of individuals, and 31 (5.5%) had someone living alone who was 65 years of age or older. The average household size was 3.13. There were 423 families (75.0% of all households); the average family size was 3.45.

The population was spread out, with 390 people (21.8%) under the age of 18, 178 people (9.9%) aged 18 to 24, 532 people (29.7%) aged 25 to 44, 488 people (27.2%) aged 45 to 64, and 204 people (11.4%) who were 65 years of age or older. The median age was 36.4 years. For every 100 females, there were 92.7 males. For every 100 females age 18 and over, there were 88.9 males.

There were 586 housing units at an average density of 306.9 per square mile (118.5/km^{2}), of which 224 (39.7%) were owner-occupied, and 340 (60.3%) were occupied by renters. The homeowner vacancy rate was 1.7%; the rental vacancy rate was 2.3%. 738 people (41.2% of the population) lived in owner-occupied housing units and 1,025 people (57.2%) lived in rental housing units.

== In popular culture ==
- Harold and Maude, (1971), a dark comedy about a death-obsessed young man and a vivacious older woman, filmed scenes at Holy Cross Cemetery and elsewhere on the Peninsula.
- Colma (1998), the fourth studio album released by guitarist Buckethead, makes reference to the town of Colma.
- Alive in Necropolis (2008), a novel by Doug Dorst.
- Colma: The Musical (2007) is an American independent film that was shot on location in Colma and Daly City.
