= Jefferson Elementary School District =

School district in California

Address
- 101 Lincoln Avenue San Mateo County Daly City, California, 94015; United States

District information
- Type: Public
- Grades: K–8
- Established: 1866
- Superintendent: Sandy Mikulik
- Governing agency: Board of Education
- Schools: 1 K-8, 10 Elementary, 3 Middle
- NCES District ID: 0618870

Students and staff
- Students: 5,597 (2020–2021)
- Teachers: 267.53 (FTE)
- Staff: 232.77 (FTE)
- Student–teacher ratio: 20.92:1

Other information
- Website: www.jsd.k12.ca.us

Jefferson Elementary School District is a K-8 school district headquartered in Daly City, San Mateo County, California, USA, serving the communities of Daly City, Colma, Broadmoor and part of Pacifica.

The district was established in 1866 and, as of 2019, has some 350 teachers serving 6,000 students. The district has ten elementary schools and four intermediate/middle schools; high schools in the area are overseen by the Jefferson Union High School District. More than 20 different languages are spoken by students in the school district.

The district is overseen by a five member elected Board of Education and an appointed Superintendent.

== History ==
Before the district's inception, parents in Daly City had to send their children to schools in the San Francisco region. The first school was in the present day Colma area and was a one-room building constructed in 1856. In the following year a new school (named Jefferson School) was constructed on land donated by Peter Dunks. The school district was established in 1866 and named Jefferson School District after Thomas Jefferson.

Woodrow Wilson Elementary School was founded in 1917 and rebuilt eighteen years later. General Pershing School, built in 1917, was remodeled in 1960. Colma Primary and Colma Intermediate Schools were established in 1951, followed by Westlake School in 1952 and Benjamin Franklin in the subsequent year. By the end of the decade, three new schools, Olympia (1955), Vista Mar, and Vista Grande (both 1958), had been opened. The 1960s witnessed the establishment of schools named in honor of Christopher Columbus, General John J. Pershing, Thomas Edison, Daniel Webster, the former US Presidents John F. Kennedy, Abraham Lincoln, and Franklin D. Roosevelt, Fernando Rivera and M. Pauline Brown. Ben Franklin Intermediate School was constructed in Broadmoor on land that had been intended for a street.

By 1972, the district had 21 schools under its supervision enrolling a total of 9,373 pupils and with a cumulative faculty of 462 teachers. Vista Grande school was demolished later. Critic Allan Temko wrote in the Architectural Forum that "These schools appear with sudden brilliance: ... carefully suited, thoughtfully planned".

William J. Savage served as superintendent of the district from 1918 to 1931. Prior to this appointment, he was principal of Jefferson School. In 2011, Matteo Rizzo retired from the post of superintendent.

== District Superintendents ==
Superintendent	Tenure
William J. Savage	1898 – 1931
Richard Crane	1931 – 1949
James Snell	1949 – 1951
Henry S. Weibel	1951 – 1959
Richard Foster	1959 – 1965
Frank L. Greenwood	1965 – 1973
Barbara Wilson	2002 - 2007
Matteo Rizzo	2008 - 2011
Bernardo Vidales	2011–2023
Sandy Mikulik	2023–Present

== Intermediate schools ==
- Benjamin Franklin Intermediate
- Fernando Rivera Intermediate
- Thomas R. Pollicita Intermediate
- Franklin D. Roosevelt K-8

== Elementary schools ==
- Daniel Webster Elementary
- Garden Village Elementary
- George Washington Elementary
- John F. Kennedy Elementary
- M. Pauline Brown Elementary
- Marjorie H. Tobias Elementary
- Susan B. Anthony Elementary
- Thomas Edison Elementary
- Westlake Elementary
- Woodrow Wilson Elementary

== Bibliography ==
- Chandler, Samuel C. (1973). "Jefferson Elementary Schools". "Gateway to the Peninsula"; a history of the city of Daly City, San Mateo County, California (PDF). Daly City, California. OCLC 799903. Archived from the original (PDF) on January 24, 2017.
- Gillespie, Bunny; Crimmen, Dave (2011). Daly City (eBook). Charleston, South Carolina: Arcadia Publishing. ISBN 978-0-7385-7523-0. OCLC 746551642.
