= Greenlawn Memorial Park (Colma, California) =

Cemetery in San Mateo County, California

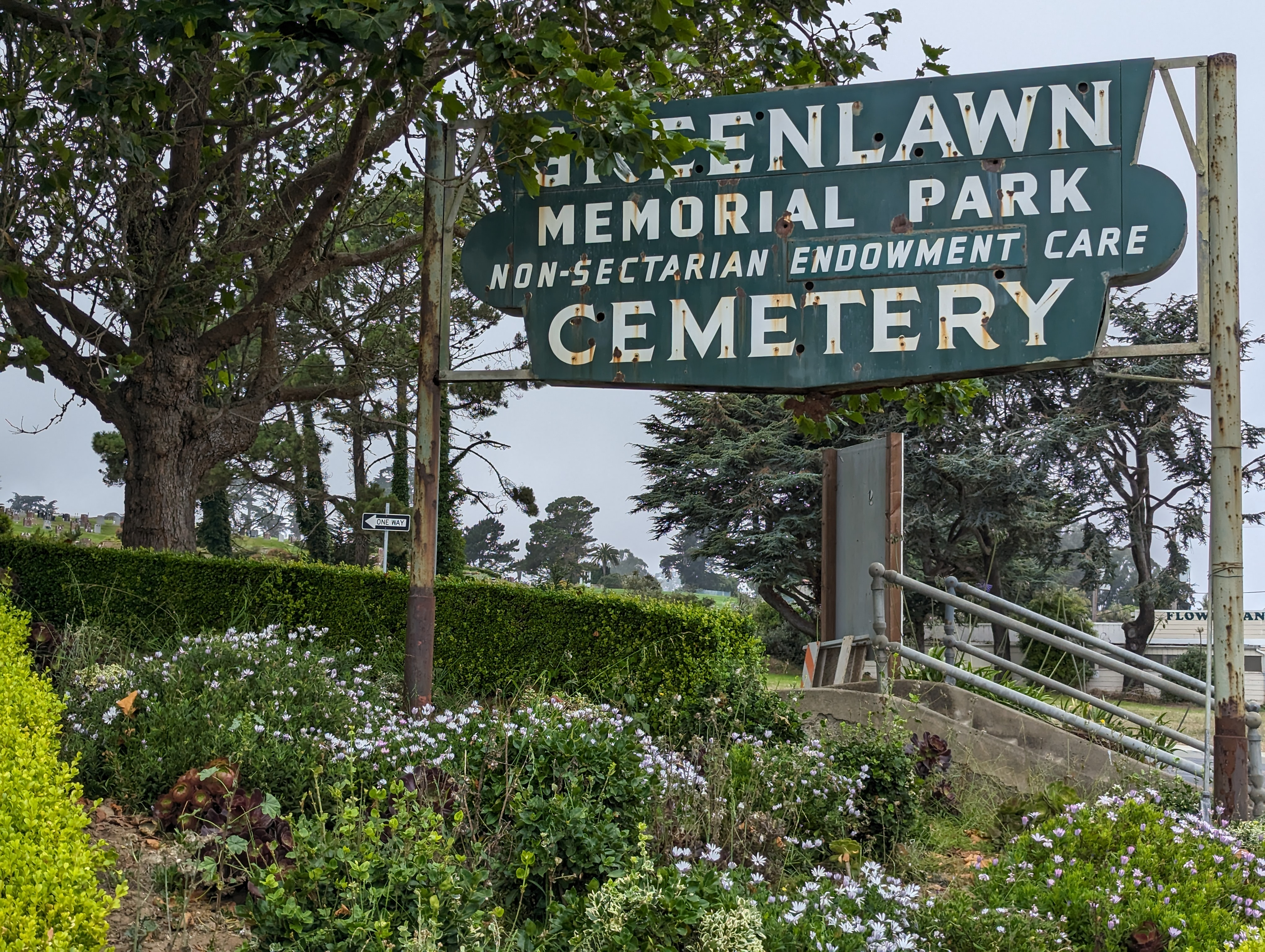

Details
- Established: 1904; 121 years ago
- Location: 1100 El Camino Real, Colma, San Mateo County, California
- Country: United States
- Coordinates: 37.67733°N 122.46328°W
- Type: Private
- No. of graves: approx. 33,600
- Website: www.greenlawnmemorialparkca.com
- Find a Grave: Greenlawn Memorial Park

Greenlawn Memorial Park, also known as the Odd Fellows Cemetery, is a private cemetery located at 1100 El Camino Real in Colma, California, United States.

It was established in 1904. In 1933, after ongoing city litigation the Odd Fellows Cemetery in San Francisco, part of the Lone Mountain Cemetery complex, reinterred some 26,000 graves to Greenlawn Memorial Park.

== Notable burials ==
- John Dempsey (c. 1848–1884), Irish-born American military officer; awarded the Medal of Honor
- Eugene Francis Loud (1847–1908), politician, lawyer, and merchant
- James George Maguire (1853–1920), politician, served three terms as U.S. Representative, for California's 4th congressional district
- William Adam Piper (1826–1899), politician, businessperson
- James Rolph (1869–1934), politician, 27th governor of California
- Hociel Thomas (1904–1952), vaudevillian, blues and jazz singer
- Victor Sen Yung (1915–1980), actor

== See also ==
- List of cemeteries in California
