= Julie Rosewald =

American singer (1847–1906)

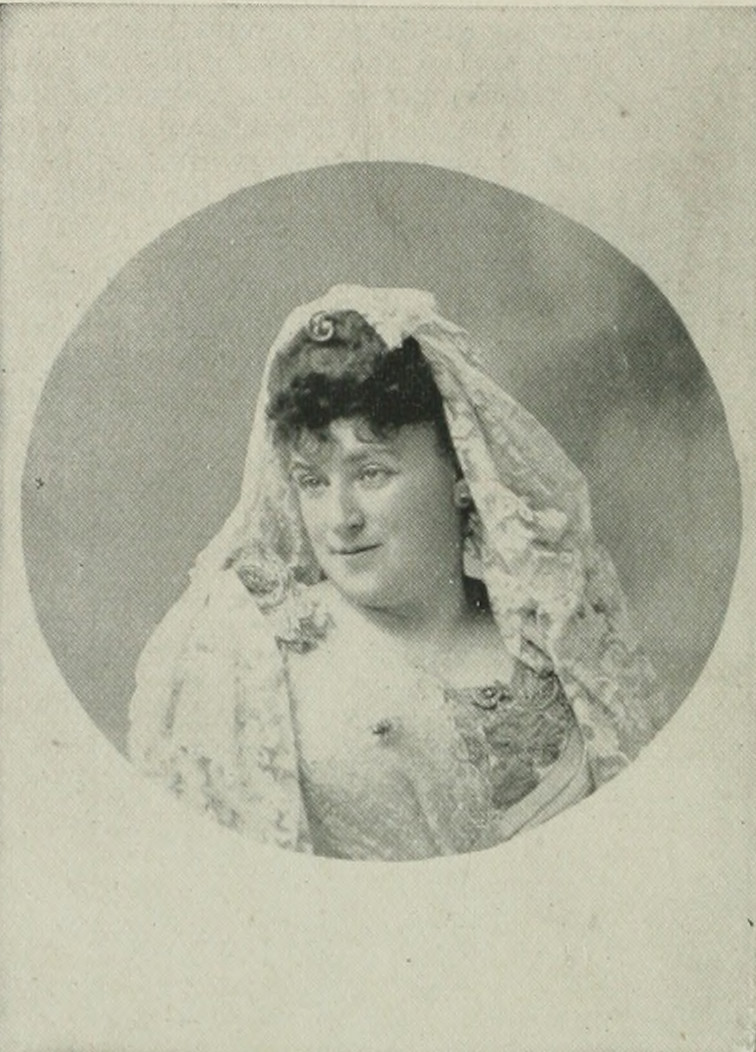

Background information
- Also known as: Cantor Soprano
- Born: Julie Eichberg; March 7, 1847; Stuttgart, Württemberg, German Confederation
- Died: July 16, 1906 (aged 59)
- Spouse: Jacob Rosewald (m. 1866)

Julie Eichberg Rosewald (March 7, 1847 – July 16, 1906) was an American opera singer. She is considered the first female cantor in the United States, serving San Francisco's Temple Emanu-El from 1884 until 1893.

== Early life and education ==
Julie Eichberg Rosewald was born in 1847 in Stuttgart, Germany, the fourth daughter of cantor Moritz Eichberg. After completing her studies at the Stuttgart Conservatory, she relocated to Baltimore, Maryland in 1864 to join her sister, Pauline Eichberg. Two years later, she married the violinist and conductor Jacob Rosewald, a Baltimore native.

Rosewald returned to Europe in 1870, where she continued her vocal training under Marongelli, Mara, and Viardot-Garcia.

== Career ==
Her career as a prima donna officially commenced in 1875 when she joined the Kellogg Opera Company. In 1877, she returned to Europe for a second time, performing in various cities including Nuremberg, Mainz, Stuttgart, Cologne, Amsterdam, Berlin, and Dresden.

In 1880, Rosewald and her husband were hired by the Abbott Opera Company, she as the prima donna and her husband as the conductor. This professional association continued until 1884 when she permanently settled in San Francisco. There, she became a popular singing teacher, notable for her expertise in vocal anatomy and physiology. Her teaching success extended to preparing students for church choirs, concert performances, and opera stages, earning her the epithet "the Marchesi of the West."

During her decade-long residence in San Francisco, she served as a member of the choir of Temple Emanu-El. She sang and recited the parts of the service traditionally sung and recited by a cantor, thus becoming the first woman to lead synagogue services in the United States. She also chose and directed the music at the synagogue, directed choir rehearsals, and collaborated with the organist.

From 1894 to 1902, she held the position of professor of singing at the Mills College Conservatory of Music. Julie Rosewald was celebrated for her extraordinary musical memory, capable of memorizing a leading role in a single night. Her repertoire encompassed one hundred and twenty-five operas, and at one point, she appeared in thirty of them during seven consecutive weeks.

== Later life and death ==
She retired from professional life in 1902 due to declining health, and died in 1906. She is buried in Colma, California.
