= Woodlawn Memorial Park (Colma, California) =

Cemetery in San Mateo County, California

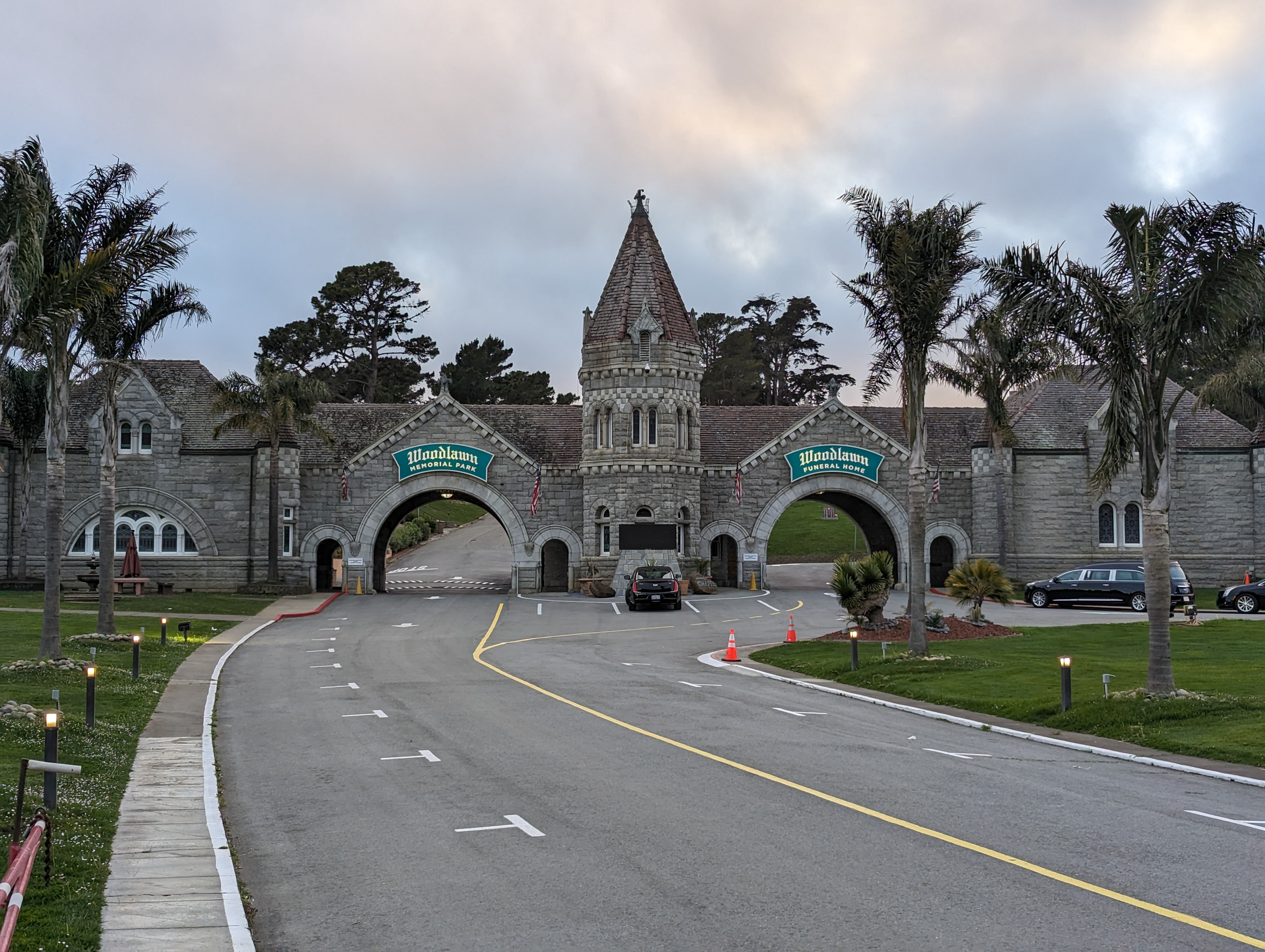
- Interactive map of Woodlawn Memorial Park

Details
- Established: 1905; 121 years ago
- Location: Colma, California
- Country: United States
- Coordinates: 37.6794°N 122.4661°W
- Owned by: Service Corporation International
- Website: www.dignitymemorial.com
- Find a Grave: Woodlawn Memorial Park

Woodlawn Memorial Park, also known as the Masonic Burial Ground, is a cemetery located at 1000 El Camino Real in Colma, California. It was established in 1905.

== History ==
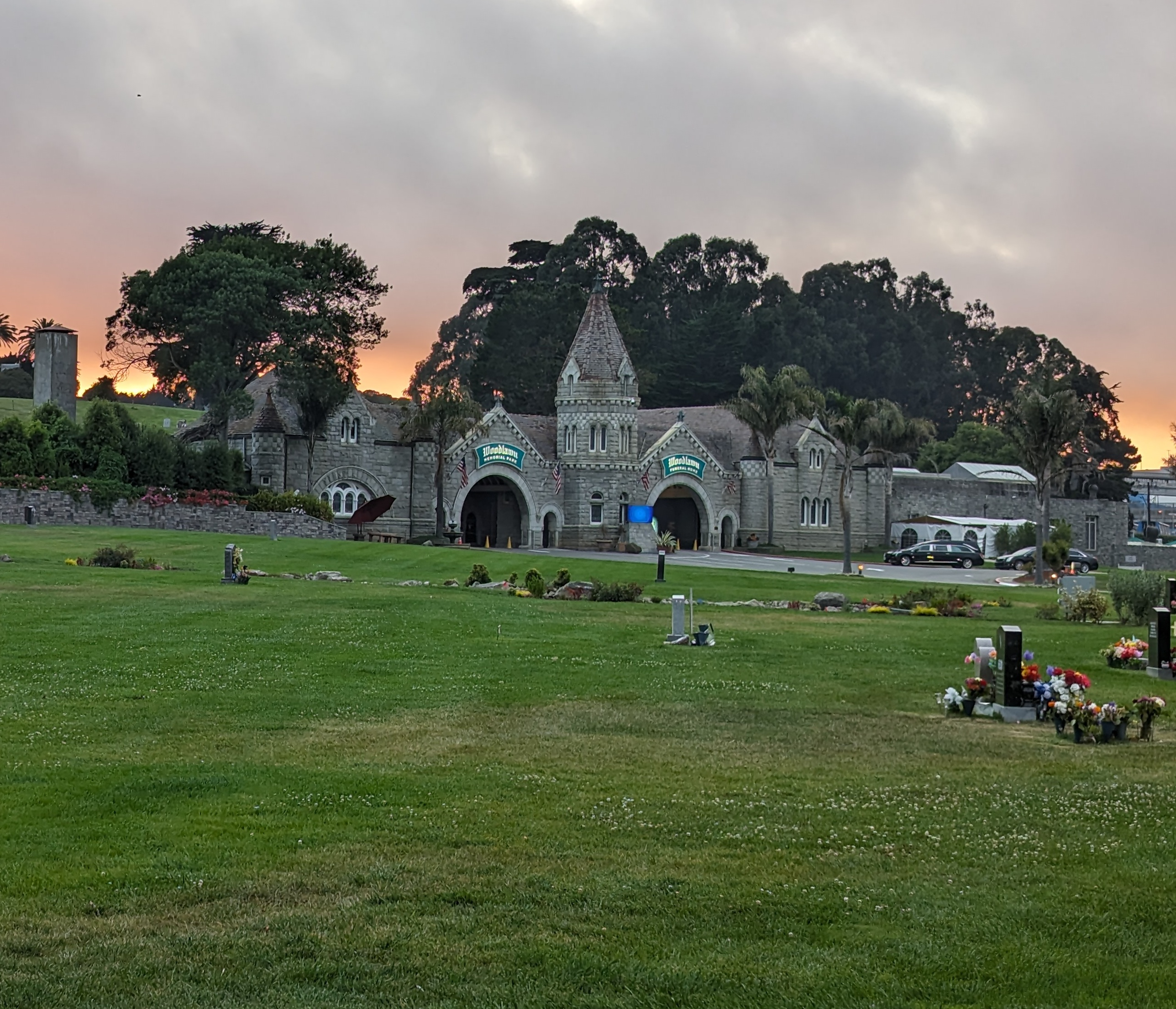
Entrance arches and chapel at Woodlawn

The Masonic Grand Lodge of California laid the cornerstone for the cemetery during a ceremony held on October 29, 1904, at a 47-acre (19 ha) site formerly used as the Seven Mile House on the stagecoach route linking San Francisco and San Jose. The entrance to the cemetery is marked by two prominent arches; T. Paterson Ross was responsible for designing the original entry arch, which was built with blue granite blocks quarried from Raymond, California. A second arch was added in the 1930s alongside administrative offices, a columbarium, mausoleum, and chapel, designed by William G. Merchant and Bernard Maybeck.

When the former Masonic Cemetery in San Francisco closed around 1935, approximately 40,000 remains were moved to this cemetery in a project that spanned many years. The Masonic Cemetery Association erected a memorial pillar in April 1933 to honor those moved.

== Notable burials ==
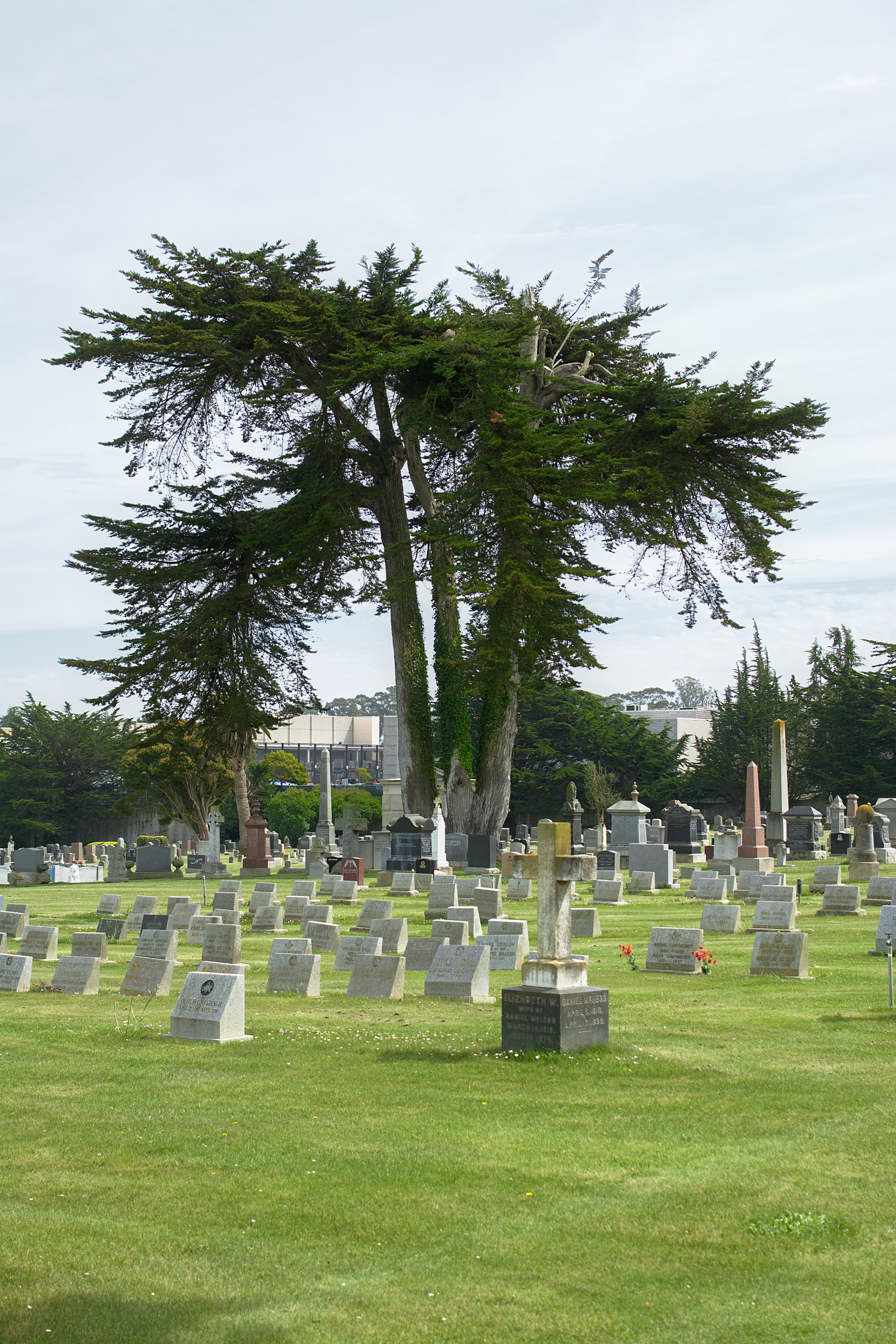
Cypress tree at Woodlawn, overlooking gravesites

- Alex Anderson (1920–2010), cartoonist who created the characters of Rocky the Flying Squirrel, Bullwinkle, and Dudley Do-Right, as well as Crusader Rabbit.
- Humbert Allen Astredo (1929–2016), stage, film, and television actor; was part of the cast of the television series. Dark Shadows (1968–1971).
- Thomas Henry Blythe (1822–1883), capitalist, tycoon, property developer.
- Henry Clausen (1905–1992), lawyer, investigator; authored the Clausen Report.
- Aylett R. Cotton (1826–1912), politician, lawyer, judge, educator and miner.
- Laura Fair (1837–1919), murderer; with a notable court case due to gender.
- Etienne Guittard (1838–1899), founder of the oldest continuously family-owned chocolate company, Guittard Chocolate Company.
- Warren Hinckle (1938-2016), American political journalist, muckraker, editor, and author.
- James Augustus Johnson (1829–1896), politician; 14th Lieutenant Governor of California.
- Charles H. Larrabee (1820–1883), politician; member of the U.S. House of Representatives from Wisconsin for the 36th Congress (1859 to 1860); his grave was moved from the Masonic Cemetery, San Francisco.
- Robert L. Lippert (1909–1976), film producer and cinema chain owner.
- Henry Miller (1827–1916), rancher who founded the cattle firm, Miller and Lux.
- Jacob H. Neff (1830–1909), politician, served as the 22nd Lieutenant Governor of California from 1899 to 1903.
- Emperor Norton (1819–1880), real name Joshua Abraham Norton, self-proclaimed Emperor of the United States; his grave was moved from the Masonic Cemetery, San Francisco in 1934.
- José Sarria (1922–2013), LGBT political activist, who styled himself as "The Widow Norton".

== See also ==
- List of cemeteries in California
