= Lone Mountain Cemetery =

Defunct cemetery in California, US

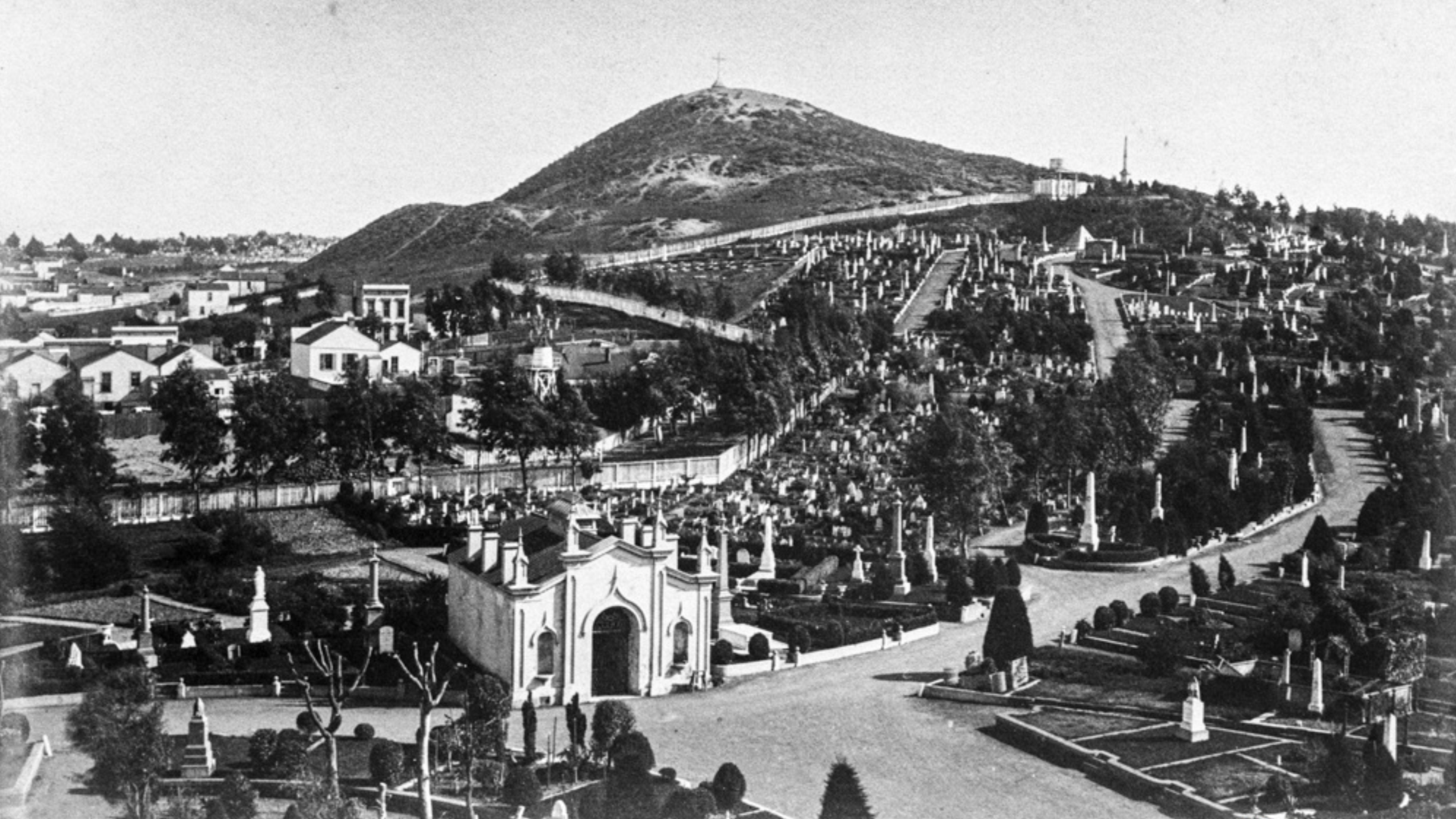
- View of Lone Mountain from the Odd Fellows Cemetery (between 1879 and 1891)
- Interactive map of Lone Mountain Cemetery

Details
- Established: 1854
- Closed: c. 1940 (but as late as 1945)
- Location: bound by California Street, Geary Boulevard, Parker Avenue, and Presidio Avenue
- Country: United States
- Coordinates: 37°47′03″N 122°27′03″W
- Type: Private
- Size: 162 acres (66 ha)
- The Political Graveyard: Lone Mountain Cemetery

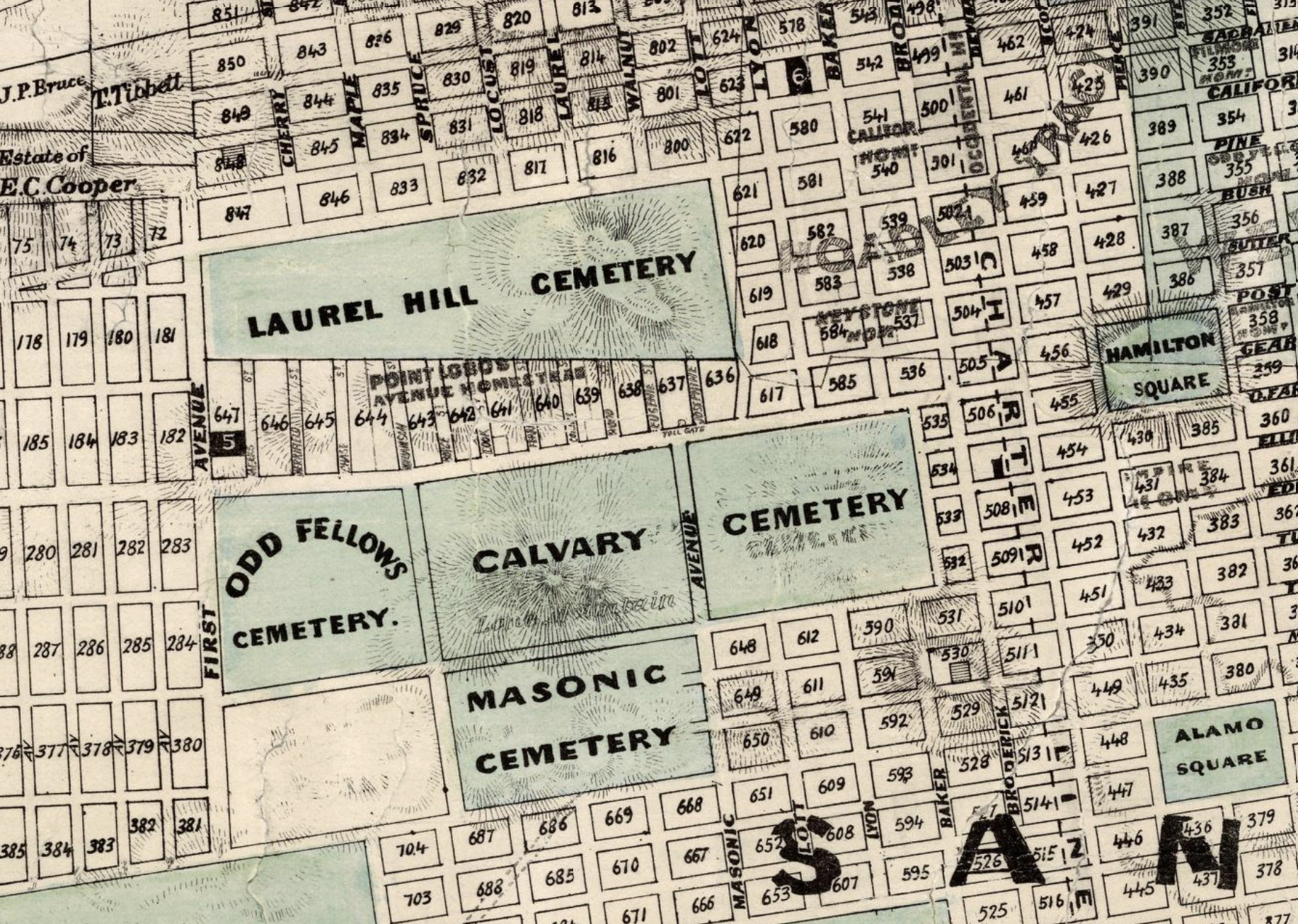
Lone Mountain Cemetery complex in 1869 map of San Francisco

Lone Mountain Cemetery was a complex of cemeteries in the Lone Mountain neighborhood of San Francisco, California, United States on the land bounded by the present-day California Street, Geary Boulevard, Parker Avenue, and Presidio Avenue. Opened in 1854, it eventually comprised Laurel Hill Cemetery, Calvary Cemetery, the Masonic Cemetery, and Odd Fellows Cemetery.

Pressure to close the complex began around the beginning of the twentieth century, and by 1941 all remains within it had been moved elsewhere, mostly to a new necropolis in Colma, California, though some were never accounted for.

The land from Laurel Hill Cemetery and Calvary Cemetery was eventually used to create housing and shopping centers within the Lone Mountain neighborhood, the Masonic Cemetery land became the campus for University of San Francisco (USF), and the Odd Fellows Cemetery had maintained the columbarium and surrounding memorial park land, and the additional land was used to create the Angelo Rossi Playground and Pool and some single family housing.

== Historical overview of the complex ==
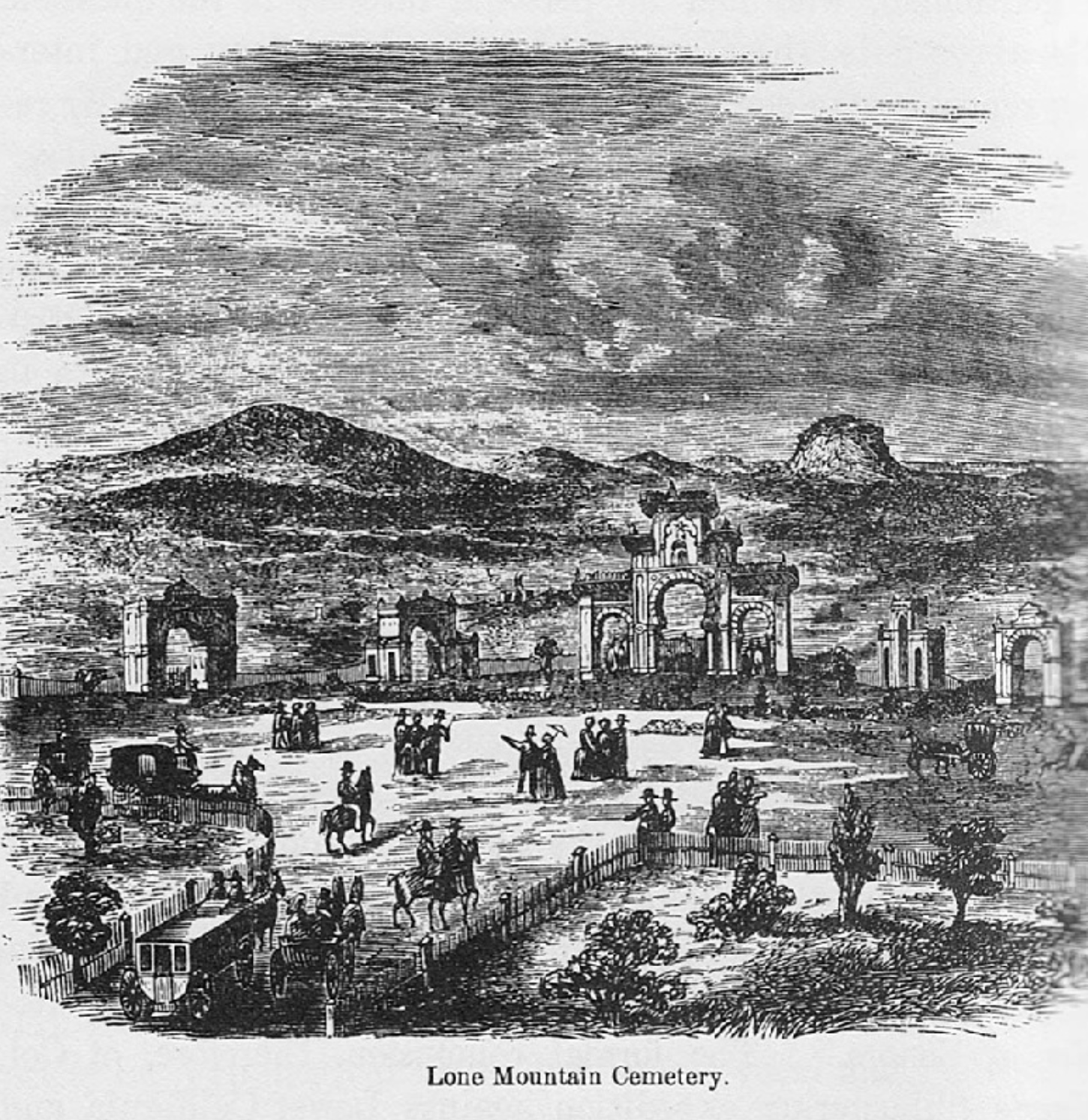
Cemetery engraving (1855) from The Annals of San Francisco book

=== Formation and usage ===
Opened May 30, 1854, Lone Mountain Cemetery was planned to cover 320 acres. However the cemetery planners decided a smaller size would suffice the city. In 1854, this area was considered one of the "outside lands", meaning it was outside of what was considered the city of San Francisco and was made of sandy soil. Prior to the establishment of Lone Mountain Cemetery, most of the burials in San Francisco were at the Yerba Buena Cemetery (present-day Civic Center Plaza).

Many of the burials within the Lone Mountain Cemetery complex were for the wealthy. The paths between the graves were named after known East Coast cemeteries, including Mount Auburn, Green-Wood, and Oak Hill. The cemeteries became a popular place for family outings and picnics on Sunday.

In 1860s there was a legal battle in the city over who was to administer Lone Mountain, as a result they decided to incorporate a section of the complex and settled on a name change to Laurel Hill Cemetery (the name of a noted cemetery in Philadelphia).

Burials in the 19th-century were not always safe, and as urban graveyards such as Lone Mountain Cemetery eventually ran out of space, which resulted in burials without using coffins. It was not uncommon to hear reports of body parts found in mausoleums or near the cemetery during this time. Chinese mourners would leave food offerings for the dead at the cemetery, which in turn brought "hungry vagrants". In 1866, a news story ran that stated "the Lone Mountain cemetery was rapidly filling up, creating deadly gasses" due to the large quantity of remains decomposing.

=== Removal of cemeteries and remains ===
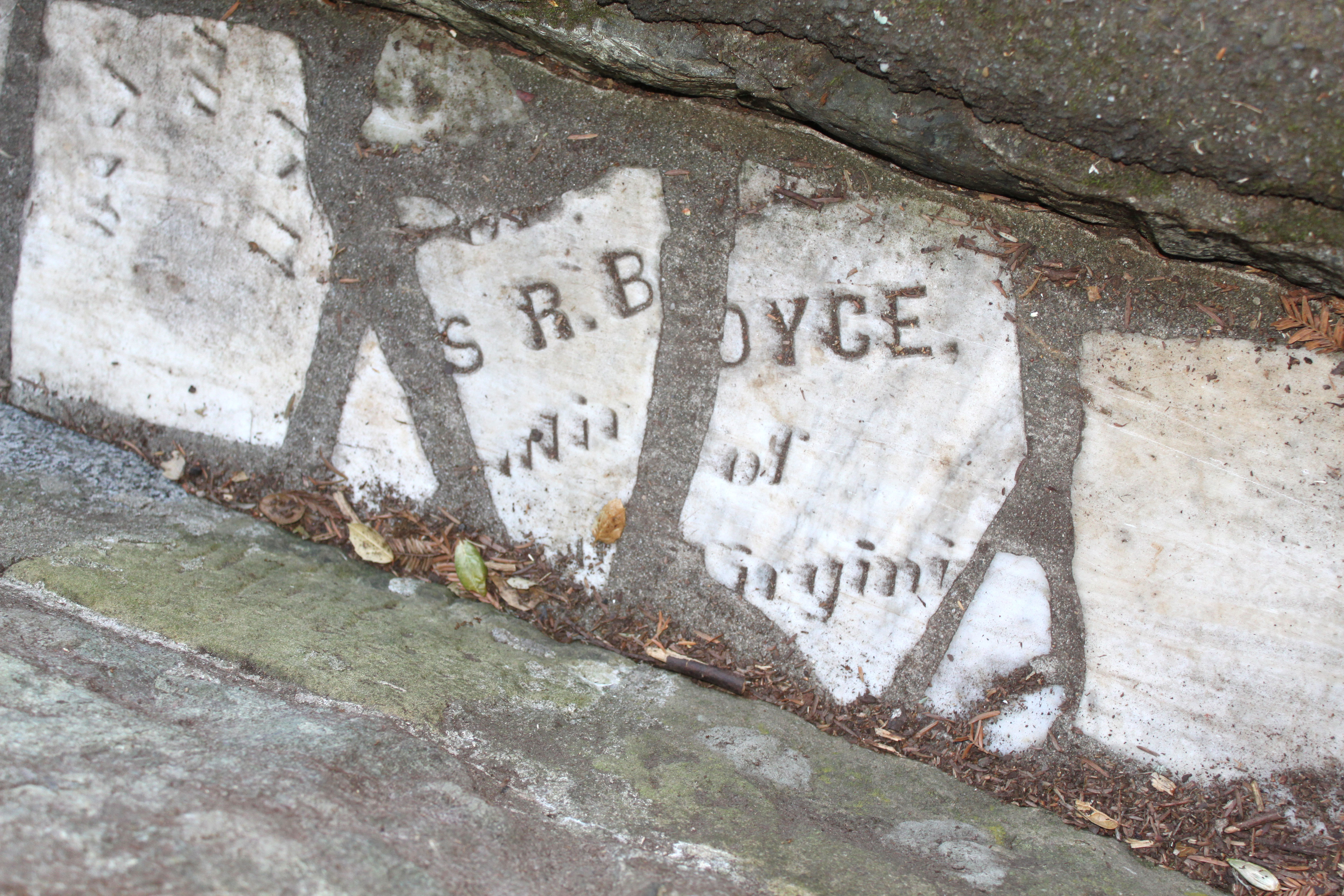
Example of a re-used gravestone, found in Buena Vista Park. In 2017 a 155-year-old gravestone from Laurel Hill was found in the basement of a San Francisco home.

The idea started circulating in the 1880s that the cemeteries needed to be moved outside of the city; complaints were made primarily by the nearby property owners who were concerned that the area would discourage any new development in the neighborhood, and for safety. At this point in history the grounds of the cemeteries had started to deteriorate, and became a haven for delinquents. In 1894, J. H. Bond, the editor of the local Richmond Banner newspaper, started to promote the removal of these cemeteries with a move to Colma due to the decay of the gravestones. Bond had been vocal on this issue for two decades and supported the common idea (for its time) that cemeteries "planted germs of disease in the organs of breathing life." The Catholic Archdiocese opposed the removal of the graves because in Calvary Cemetery they were on "hallowed ground". Another point of argument was the importance of the buried San Francisco pioneers, and moving them would be disrespectful, "preserve the sanctity of the dead". The battle to remove the cemeteries continued for years, with groups such as the "Cemetery Defense League" and "Save our Cemeteries" fighting to stop city evictions.

In 1902, the San Francisco Board of Supervisors had passed a law to prohibit the sale of grave lots or to permit any new burials within the city. By late 1910, cremation was also prohibited within the city. The California State Legislature passed the Morris Act in 1921, authored by Clarence W. Morris (1888–1965), which allowed a cemetery to be abandoned if ratified by a majority of lot owners. The Morris Act of 1921 was stopped by litigation and by 1923 a second Morris Act had passed, giving municipalities the ability to remove bodies, but requiring "police power" and requiring burial to have been prohibited by law for a set number of years.

From 1923 until 1929, ongoing litigation prevented the removal of the buried; the majority of the buried were moved on or after 1929. The bodies would be moved at no expense, but, for a headstone to be moved, the family had to pay the cost. As a result, many of the gravestones were reused for the sea wall at Aquatic Park, the creation of a breakwater at the St. Francis Yacht Club in the Marina, lining for rain gutters in Buena Vista Park, and erosion control at Ocean Beach. Contractor Charles L. Harney was paid to dump the large crypts and large tomb markers into the San Francisco Bay. In the present-day, every once in a while the full-sized gravestones will emerge at Ocean Beach, particularly after a storm.

From February 1940 until after World War II (circa 1945), the process of moving the last remains from San Francisco to Colma was completed.

== Laurel Hill Cemetery (formerly Lone Mountain Cemetery) ==
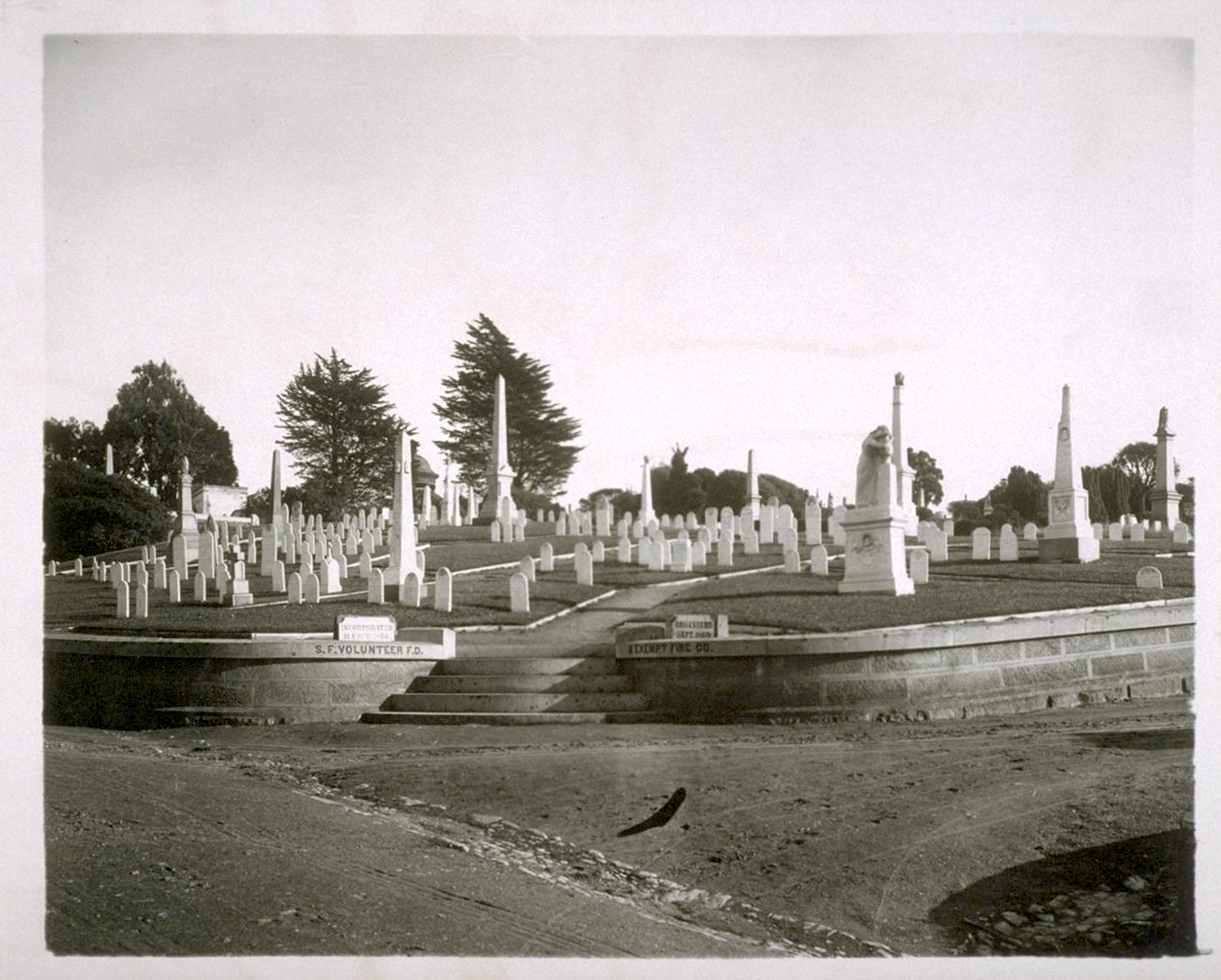
Laurel Hill Cemetery, San Francisco, c. 1854–1906

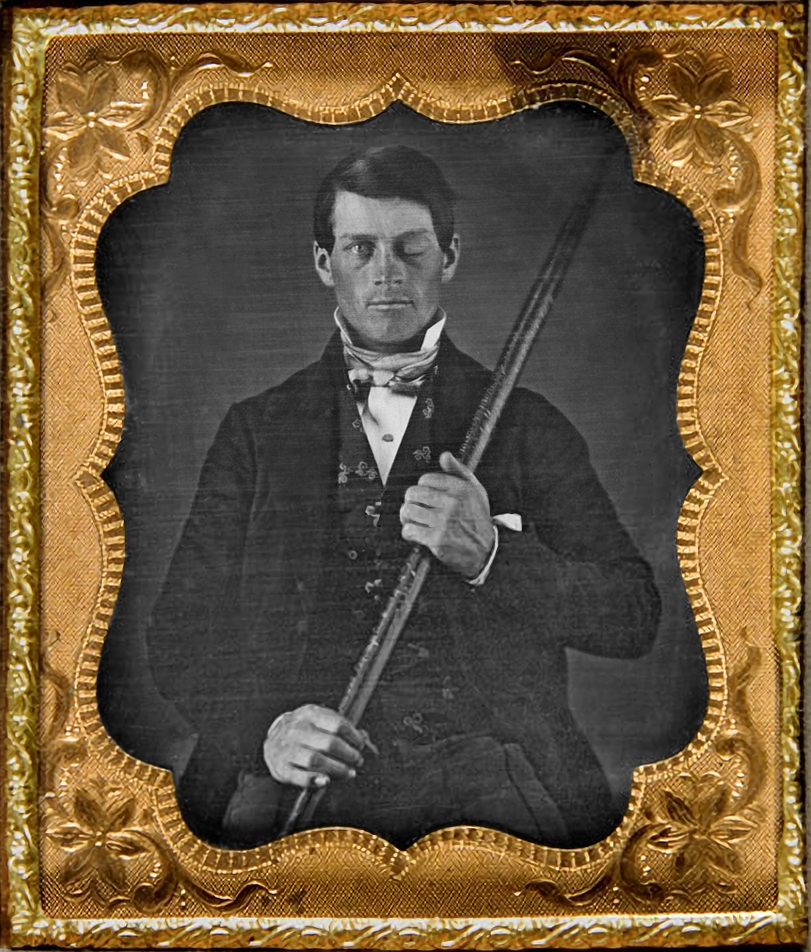
Phineas Gage was buried twice in Lone Mountain Cemetery

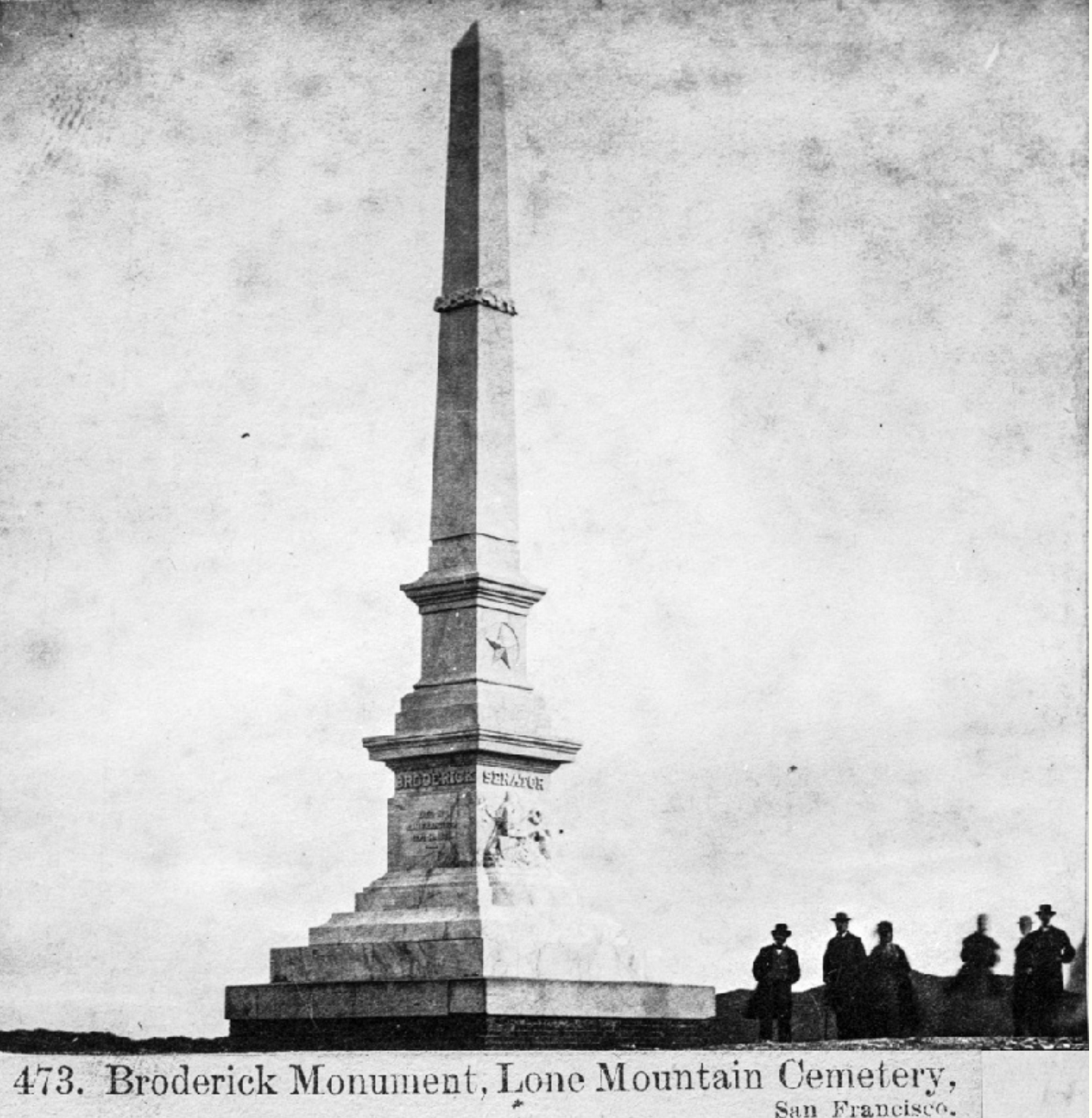
Broderick's Monument (c. 1867)

=== History ===
The Lone Mountain Cemetery (active from 1854 to c. 1940) was 55.4 acres at the time of founding and was located between California, Euclid, Masonic and Arguello Streets. The first burial at Lone Mountain Cemetery was interred on June 10, 1854, and he was named John Orr.

In the 1860s, there was a legal battle in the city over who was to administer Lone Mountain. As a result, Lone Mountain Cemetery was renamed to Laurel Hill Cemetery, with the filing of the articles of incorporation by many wealthy locals, including William Chapman Ralston, John Parrott, Henry Huntly Haight, Nicholas Luning, James Otis, Alvinza Hayward, Henry Mayo Newhall, and C. C. Butler. The new name of Laurel Hill Cemetery started in 1867, and it was named after the Laurel Hill garden cemetery in Philadelphia.

=== Notable burials ===
In 1848, Phineas Gage had survived a work accident when a large iron rod driven was completely through his head, destroying parts of his brain and skull. He died in 1860 and was buried in Lone Mountain Cemetery. In 1866, his physician John Martyn Harlow exhumed his skull in order to study it, and placed the skull with the iron bar on display at the Warren Anatomical Museum. In 1940, as part of the mandated cemetery relocations within the city of San Francisco, Gage's headless body was relocated to Cypress Lawn Memorial Park in Colma, California.

One of the notable grave markers within Lone Mountain Cemetery was for senator David Colbreth Broderick who died in the Broderick–Terry duel of 1859; the Broderick's Monument, which was a tall stone obelisk on a platform with stairs and a low railing surrounding it. During the 1906 earthquake the Broderick's Monument obelisk lost its upper portion.

Some of the other notable pioneer burials at this site included Judge Silas W. Sanderson; politician, Samuel Williams Inge; lawyer, Thomas W. Sutherland; lawyer Thomas O. Larkin; surgeon and University of California, San Francisco founder Hugh H. Toland; the builder of the first wharf in the city, Squire Clark; an early sheriff, David Scannell; newspaper editor, James King of William; Commodore James Thomas Watkins; founder of Woodward's Gardens, Robert B. Woodward; the inventor of the cable car, Andrew Smith Hallidie; politician, James Van Ness; U.S. Senator, William M. Stewart; U.S. Senator, John Percival Jones; San Francisco mayor, James Otis; businessman, William Chapman Ralston; and U.S. Senator, James Graham Fair.

=== Grave relocations ===
Some of the families of those interred at the Laurel Hill and Calvary Cemeteries moved their family remains at their own expense. In June 1901, an unknown number of remains from Laurel Hill Cemetery were moved to the Japanese Cemetery, Cypress Lawn Memorial Park, and the Serbian Cemetery, all in Colma. 35,000 of the Laurel Hill remains were removed between 1939 and 1940, and placed in redwood coffins, and were taken to Colma; where they were stored for six years in Cypress Abbey Mausoleum. World War II had delayed the construction of a new burial chamber; and after the war the cost to build was too high, so instead the remains were placed beneath a large burial mound at Cypress Lawn. It was not until 1993, that the memorial obelisk for those that were re-interred was placed on the 5 acre mound at Cypress Lawn.

There had been plans to create a 5-acre memorial park in the Laurel Hill neighborhood, which did not receive enough support. The land for the Laurel Hill Cemetery became subdivided for housing and shopping centers.

The site of the Laurel Hill Cemetery (at 3333 California Street; number 760) is listed as a California Historical Landmark.

== Calvary Cemetery ==
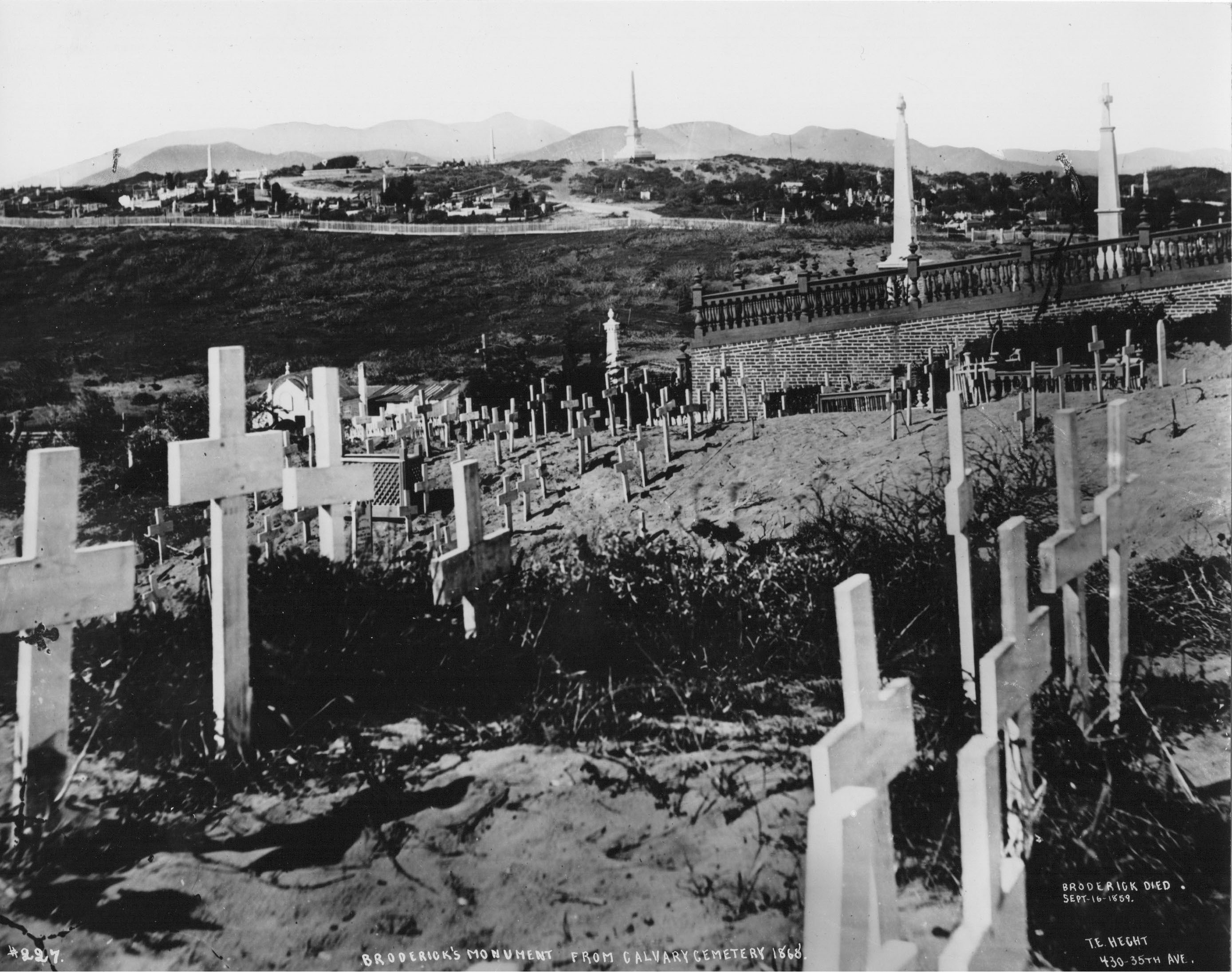
View from Calvary Cemetery (1866) and Broderick's Monument in the background

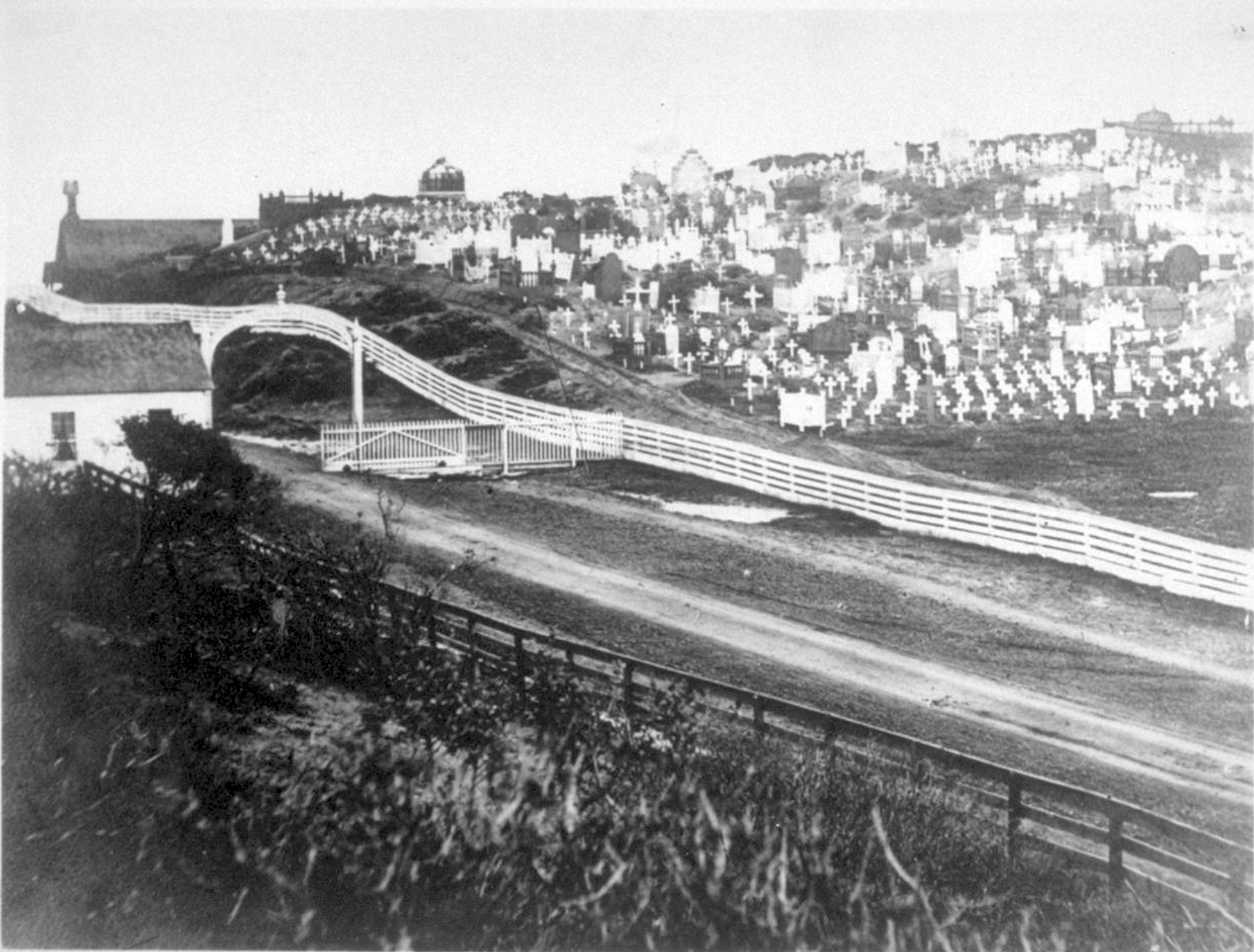
Calvary Cemetery and the Point Lobos toll gate (circa 1890s), San Francisco

=== History ===
The Calvary Catholic Cemetery, also known as Mount Calvary Cemetery (active from 1860 to 1941) was 49.2 acres in size, founded by Archbishop Joseph Sadoc Alemany who purchased sloped land on Lone Mountain on August 16, 1860. It was located between Geary, Turk, Saint Joseph, and Masonic Streets.

The graves of this cemetery were predominantly of the Irish. In 1860, a chapel was built on Point Lobos (now Geary Boulevard), where Joseph Alemany held mass once a month. In 1862, 4 wooden crosses were added to the top of Lone Mountain.

=== Notable burials ===
Charles Cora (c. 1810–1852) was an Italian-born gambler, who had met Belle Cora (c. 1827–1862), a 19th-century prostitute in New Orleans. They moved to San Francisco together for work; and eventually (due to circumstances around a murder) Charles Cora was hanged in 1852 by the San Francisco Committee of Vigilance. Right before the hanging, he married Bella Cora, and when he died she buried him at the Mission Dolores Cemetery. She was told that she couldn't be buried next to her husband at Mission Dolores, so she disinterred Charles Cora and buried him at Calvary Cemetery; and when she died, she was buried next to him in Calvary. In 1916, the San Francisco Bulletin newspaper published a serial about the Coras by Pauline Jacobson. As a result of the news coverage, Bella Cora and Charles Cora were disinterred from Calvary Cemetery and reburied beneath a common headstone at the Mission Dolores Cemetery.

Notable graves in Calvary included politicians, James A. McDougall; Eugene Casserly; and Delos R. Ashley.

=== Grave relocations ===
The Catholic Archdiocese opposed the removal of the graves because in Calvary Cemetery they were on "hallowed ground". By 1937, the Catholic Archdiocese stopped fighting the removal of the buried; and some 55,000 bodies were removed with a priest in attendance and privacy screens. Approximately 40,000 remains at the Calvary Cemetery were moved to Holy Cross Cemetery in Colma, the project spanned many years. Some of the families of the Laurel Hill and Calvary Cemeteries moved their family remains at their own expense.

=== Development ===
In 1944 the land on which Calvary Cemetery sits was sold to developers and was subdivided for housing, shopping centers, and an elementary school. In a 1946 opinion piece Herb Caen described the development of the Anza Vista neighborhood by noting "...The naked light standards and curbstones marking future streets and avenues in the desert that was Calvary Cemetery—where the homes of the living will replace the homes of the dead..."

== Masonic Cemetery ==
The Masonic Cemetery (active from 1864 to 1935) was approximately 30 acres located between Turk, Fulton, Parker and Masonic Streets (now the University of San Francisco). The tombstones were used as fill on the land leading up to the Golden Gate Bridge. It was created for the burial of members of the Masonic Order. Notable graves at Masonic Cemetery included Emperor Norton, James A. Johnson, and Thomas Bowles Shannon.

=== Grave relocations ===
In June 1901, an unknown number of remains at the Masonic Cemetery were moved to the Japanese Cemetery in Colma. Because of the passage of the Morris Act (1921), the Masonic Cemetery continued to move the graves, until they were stopped by litigation. The majority of burial removal for this cemetery happened after 1929 because of litigation, and took around 6 years. Some 40,000 of the buried in Masonic were moved to Woodlawn Cemetery in Colma.

=== USF campus ===
All of the 30 acres became part of the campus of the University of San Francisco (formerly St. Ignatius College). Many of the remains had been unaccounted for, and during three different occasions of campus building and renovations (which included USF's Gleeson Library, Hayes-Healy residence hall, and the John Lo Schiavo, S.J. Center for Science and Innovation) they have found human remains and burial materials.

== Odd Fellows Cemetery ==
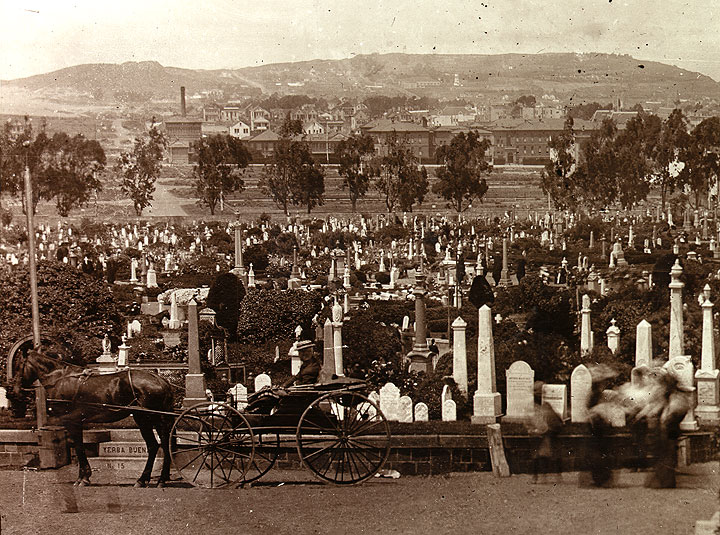
Odd Fellows Cemetery (1899), Richmond District, San Francisco

The Odd Fellows Cemetery (active from 1864 to 1933) was approximately 27 acres located between Geary, Turk, Parker, and Arguello Streets. It was the burial site for local members of the Independent Order of Odd Fellows. In 1898, the Columbarium was built at the entrance, and which is still standing in its same location.

=== Grave relocations ===
The majority of burial removal for this cemetery happened after 1929 because of litigation, and took around 6 years. In 1933, the 26,000 buried at the Odd Fellows Cemetery in San Francisco were moved to Greenlawn Memorial Park in Colma, California. Portions of the Odd Fellows Cemetery became the Rossi Playground, through W.P.A. labor. A five-acre tract of land was retained for the columbarium and memorial park.

=== 2016 casket ===
A casket and the remains of two-year-old Edith Howard Cook, who had died in 1876 and was buried at Odd Fellows Cemetery, was discovered in 2016 under a house in the Richmond District. After an archaeoforensic investigation the child's remains, the results were matched to the nearest living relative, a great-nephew. Edith was reburied in a public ceremony at Greenlawn Memorial Park with the assistance of the Garden of Innocence organization in Colma, California.

== See also ==
- Camp Merritt, California
- List of cemeteries in California
- Pioneer cemetery
