= John Dempsey (Medal of Honor) =

- Born: c. 1848; Ireland
- Died: September 14, 1884; San Francisco, California, US
- Burial place: Greenlawn Memorial Park, Colma, California, U.S.
- Military career
- Allegiance: United States
- Branch: United States Navy
- Rank: Seaman
- Unit: USS Kearsarge
- Awards: Medal of Honor

John Dempsey (c. 1848–1884), was an Irish-born American military officer, who served as a United States Navy sailor and a recipient of the United States military's highest decoration, the Medal of Honor.

== Biography ==
Born in 1848 in Ireland, Dempsey immigrated to the United States and joined the U.S. Navy from Massachusetts. By January 23, 1875, he was serving as a seaman on the USS Kearsarge. On that day, while Kearsarge was at Shanghai, China, he jumped overboard and rescued a shipmate Landsman named John J. Linden from drowning. For this action, he was awarded the Medal of Honor.

Dempsey's official Medal of Honor citation reads:

On board the U.S.S. Kearsarge at Shanghai, China, 23 January 1875. Displaying gallant conduct, Dempsey jumped overboard from the Kearsarge and rescued from drowning one of the crew of that vessel.

He died on September 14, 1884, in San Francisco. He was buried at Greenlawn Memorial Park in Colma, California.

== See also ==
- List of Medal of Honor recipients during peacetime
