= Jewish Community Memory Garden =

Jewish spiritual space for mourning lost pregnancies

Coordinates: 37.67878°N 122.45892°W

The Memory Garden is the first Jewish sacred space in the United States dedicated to expressing grief over infertility, pregnancy loss due to miscarriage or abortion, or stillbirth or death of a newborn. Judaism has a complex definition of the beginning of life, and does not have a traditional ritual for mourning fetuses or newborns prior to the age of thirty days. The Memory Garden builds on existing traditions, following halakah (Jewish law), and acknowledges the need of expectant parents and other family members across all streams of Jewish practice to recognize the emotional toll these losses take.

The Jewish Community Memory Garden is located in Colma, California, USA on the grounds of the Sinai Memorial Chapel Jewish funeral home's Eternal Home Cemetery, one of the few Jewish cemeteries serving the city of San Francisco and the nearby San Francisco Peninsula. The Memory Garden was founded by Abby Porth and Debbie Findling, two Jewish women who experienced fertility losses.

== Start of life and bereavement practices ==
Jewish tradition encompasses many textual debates about when life begins, but rabbinic tradition suggests that a fetus is part of the mother's body, rather than an independent life. The baby must draw breath on its own after birth to be considered an independent life. Furthermore, Talmud indicates a newborn is not considered to have been born at full term, and subject to traditional burial and mourning practices, until it has survived for thirty days. This is likely due to the thousands of years of high rates of miscarriage and infant mortality. Commentator Rashi wrote that a stillborn child does not have a soul and Maimonides stated that ritual mourning is not performed for stillborn infants. Thus, many Jewish traditions dictate that mourning rituals such as sitting shiva, holding a public burial, and recognizing the yahrzeit (anniversary of a death) do not apply to a fetus or to a baby less than thirty days old.

== Development ==
Abigail Porth and Debbie Findling began discussing the idea for the Memory Garden in 2009. Porth experienced a miscarriage and found that there were no practices within the Jewish community to help her mourn and recover. She reached out to Findling, who had also experienced the stillborn birth of her first child and multiple subsequent miscarriages, with the idea of creating a space similar to the AIDS Memorial Grove. They felt there was a strong community need for an externalized, visible space to mourn infertility or loss of a child through miscarriage, abortion, stillbirth, or infant mortality in the first month after birth.

They also hoped to create educational and support materials for the larger Jewish community. When delivering her stillborn child, Findling had experienced a nurse saying an uninvited Christian prayer over Findling's baby; upon filing a complaint with the hospital, she was told that the Jewish community had not provided the hospital with guidelines for supporting Jewish parents experiencing fertility loss. Based on Findling's experiences, Porth and Findling also planned outreach trainings for therapists, preschools, social and medical care providers for supporting individuals experiencing infertility and fertility loss.

The two women began working with Bay Area Jewish Healing Center, Jewish Family and Children's Services, and other professionals who worked with fertility and pregnancy loss in the Jewish community of the San Francisco Bay Area. Together, they approached a local Jewish cemetery, Sinai Memorial Chapel. They hoped to purchase some land at the cemetery for their project. The Board of the funeral home instead voted unanimously to provide the cemetery space for the garden at no cost.

The organizers ran focus groups, both of people who had personally experienced losses and of rabbis from different streams of observance. Spiritual leaders from many denominations of Judaism signed on to bring the project to fruition, including rabbis from the Reform, Conservative, and Orthodox movements.

The $1.2 million project was supported by donors from across the Jewish community. The Jewish Community Federation of San Francisco oversaw a fund to which the Jewish community could donate in support of the project, and the Taube Foundation for Jewish Life & Culture provided two matching grants. Jewish Family and Children’s Services (JFCS) of San Francisco, the Peninsula, Marin & Sonoma Counties was a leading organizational partner and funder of the project, and the Koret Foundation contributed a significant grant toward the garden’s development.

While Porth and Findling originally aimed to be completed in 2016, the project was stalled by some legal matters including right-of-way for the Bay Area Rapid Transit subway system and the need to move some electrical utility infrastructure. Then, the COVID-19 pandemic delayed its official opening. The Memory Garden was dedicated November 13, 2022, with participation from across the local Jewish community, including speeches from rabbis representing the Orthodox and Reform movements.

== Design ==
The Memory Garden inhabits an open space adjoining the children's section of the cemetery. In order to align with halakhah and traditional practice, the garden is a place of commemoration, but does not hold any graves or markers. Designed by San Francisco landscape architecture firm MPA Design, the space is surrounded by a grove of redwood trees, and features plants native to California. In the center is a circular path around a ring of flowing water, 55 feet in diameter, that is lined with stones. Within the water feature is a round grassy area. The outer edge of the circle is engraved with the months of the year in both English and Hebrew. This circular center space symbolizes a womb and recalls the cyclical nature of Jewish tradition. The water feature is lined with loose stones which visitors can remove and place on any month of the year that they wish to commemorate, analogous to the Jewish tradition of leaving visitation stones on grave markers to demonstrate mourning and bereavement.

== Programs in the community ==
Beyond the physical Memory Garden itself, the Bay Area Healing Center and Jewish Family and Children's Services of San Francisco, the Peninsula, Marin & Sonoma Counties have developed a range of services and educational materials related to infertility and fertility loss.
