= James Rolph =

27th Governor of California and 30th Mayor of San Francisco

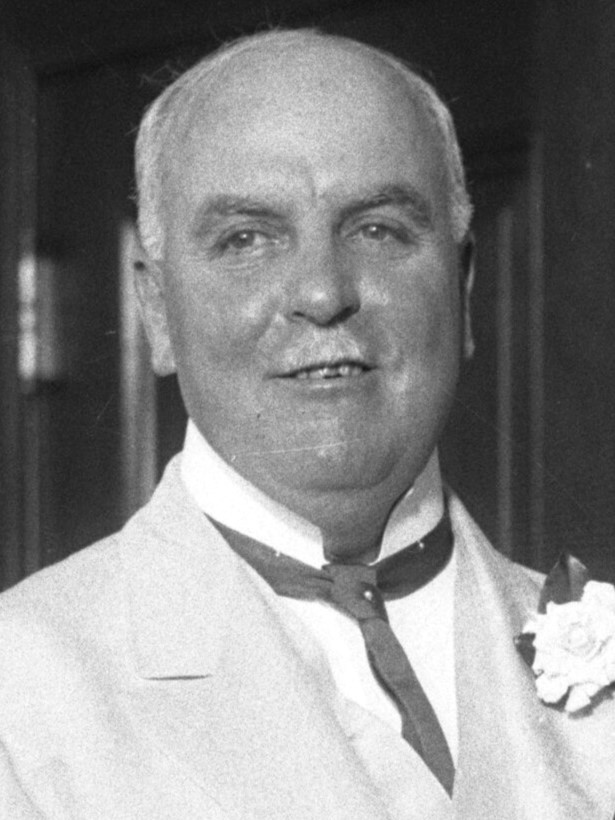
- Rolph in 1928

27th Governor of California
- In office January 6, 1931 – June 2, 1934
- Lieutenant: Frank Merriam
- Preceded by: C. C. Young
- Succeeded by: Frank Merriam

Chair of the National Governors Association
- In office July 26, 1933 – June 2, 1934
- Preceded by: John Garland Pollard
- Succeeded by: Paul V. McNutt

30th Mayor of San Francisco
- In office January 8, 1912 – January 6, 1931
- Preceded by: P. H. McCarthy
- Succeeded by: Angelo Rossi

Personal details
- Born: August 23, 1869 San Francisco, California, U.S.
- Died: June 2, 1934 (aged 64) Santa Clara County, California, U.S.
- Resting place: Greenlawn Memorial Park, Colma, California, U.S.
- Party: Republican
- Spouse: Annie Marshall Reid
- Children: 3
- Relatives: Thomas Rolph (brother)

James "Sunny Jim" Rolph Jr. (August 23, 1869 – June 2, 1934) was an American politician. A member of the Republican Party, he was elected to a single term as the 27th governor of California from January 6, 1931, until his death on June 2, 1934, at the height of the Great Depression. Previously, Rolph had been the 30th mayor of San Francisco from January 8, 1912, until his resignation in 1931 to become governor. Rolph remains the longest-serving mayor in San Francisco history.

== Life and career ==
Rolph c. 1911

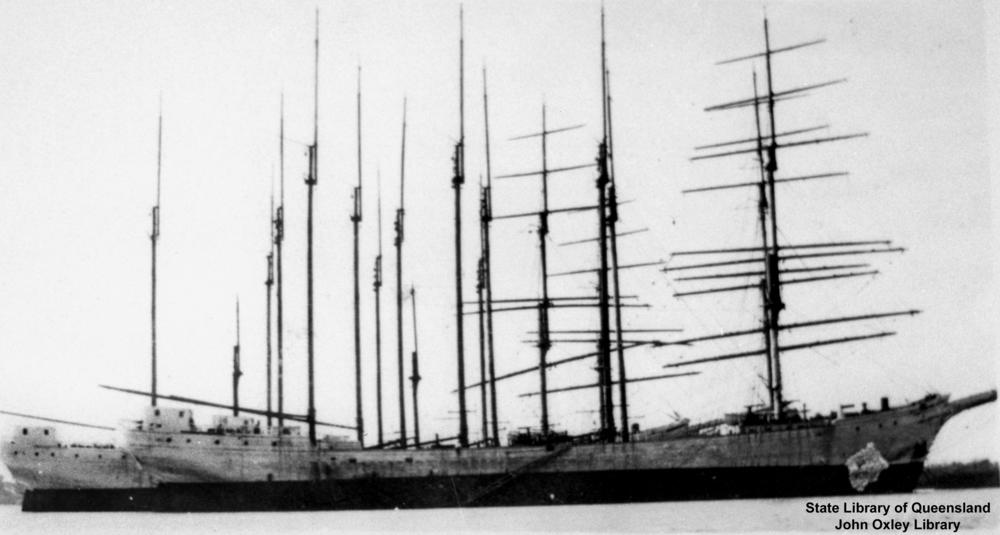
Annie M. Rolph at dock

Rolph was born in San Francisco, the son of Margaret (née Nicol) and James Rolph. He had four brothers, including Thomas Rolph and George M. Rolph, and two sisters. After attending school in the Mission District, he went to work as an office boy in a commission house. He married Annie Marshall Reid (1872–1956) and had at least one son: James Rolph III (1904–1980).

Rolph entered the shipping business in 1900 by forming a partnership with George Hind. Over the next decade, he served as president of two banks, one of which he helped establish. Although he was asked to run for mayor in 1909, he chose to wait until 1911 to run for mayor—a position that he would hold for nineteen years. As mayor, he was known as "Sunny Jim", and his theme song was "There Are Smiles That Make You Happy". In 1915, he appeared as himself in an early documentary film titled Mabel and Fatty Viewing the World's Fair at San Francisco, which starred Fatty Arbuckle and Mabel Normand and was directed by Arbuckle. In 1924, Rolph appeared as himself in a Slim Summerville comedy short film, Hello, 'Frisco.

Rolph knew of the power in San Francisco of the Roman Catholic Church. Italians, Irish, French and Germans made up the majority of the population of the city. He established a deep friendship with Archbishop Edward Joseph Hanna.

In addition to his mayoral duties and overseeing his shipping interests, he directed the Ship Owners and Merchants Tugboat Company and the San Francisco Chamber of Commerce. He also was vice-president of the Panama–Pacific International Exposition and president of the Merchants' Exchange. He resigned in 1931 to assume the office of governor of California.

Rolph received considerable criticism for publicly praising the citizens of San Jose following the November 1933 lynching of the confessed kidnapper-murderers of Brooke Hart, a local department store heir, while promising to pardon anyone involved, thereby earning the nickname "Governor Lynch." Four days before the lynching, he had announced he would not call on the National Guard to prevent the lynching, which was already being discussed locally.

After violence erupted during the San Joaquin cotton strike in October 1933, Governor Rolph appointed a fact-finding committee to investigate the deaths of several strikers. When the committee met in Visalia on October 19, 1933, Caroline Decker, a labor activist who had taken part in other California agricultural actions, took testimony from the strikers who testified about the growers' assaults on striking workers.

== Death ==
After suffering several heart attacks, Rolph died in Santa Clara County on June 2, 1934, aged 64, three years into his term. He was the second California governor to die in office, the first being Washington Bartlett in 1887. Rolph is buried at Greenlawn Memorial Park in Colma, California. He was succeeded as governor by Lieutenant Governor Frank Merriam.

== Legacy ==
On September 7, 1934, the California Toll Bridge Authority passed a resolution "that...the San Francisco-Oakland Bay Bridge be dedicated as a lasting memorial to the memory of James Rolph Jr."

A 1993 survey of historians, political scientists and urban experts conducted by Melvin G. Holli of the University of Illinois at Chicago ranked Rolph as the twenty-third-best American big-city mayor to have served between the years 1820 and 1993.

== See also ==
- 1911 San Francisco mayoral election

Political offices
Preceded by P. H. McCarthy	Mayor of San Francisco; 1912–1931	Succeeded by Angelo Rossi
Preceded by C. C. Young	Governor of California; 1931–1934	Succeeded by Frank Merriam
Preceded by John Garland Pollard	Chair of the National Governors Association; 1933–1934	Succeeded by Paul V. McNutt
Party political offices
Preceded by C. C. Young	Republican nominee for Governor of California; 1930	Succeeded by Frank Merriam
