= Koda Farms =

American rice farm in California

- Company type: Private
- Industry: Food
- Founded: 1928; 98 years ago
- Founder: Keisaburo Koda
- Headquarters: Dos Palos, California, United States
- Key people: Ross Koda, Robin Koda
- Products: rice, organic rice
- Number of employees: 50
- Website: www.kodafarms.com

Koda Farms is a third-generation family owned American company based in Dos Palos, California. The company was established in 1928 by Keisaburo Koda. It is the oldest family owned and operated rice farm in California.

Koda Farms is a producer of Japanese style rice and rice flours. Products are distributed domestically and also exported in limited quantities.

== History ==
=== Early years ===
Founder of present-day Koda Farms, Keisaburo Koda was born in 1882 with roots in the town of Ogawa in the Fukushima prefecture of Japan. His father was a samurai of the Taira Clan, but later became an established miller and broker of rice and rice flour. As a young man, Keisaburo attained a university degree and became a school principal at the age of twenty. Familiar with stories of fellow Japanese who had journeyed to America to seek their fortunes, Keisaburo eventually resigned from his position to pursue his dreams.

Following his arrival in California in 1908, Keisaburo undertook numerous ventures. Early on, he wildcatted for oil in the Coalinga hills, he ran a tuna canning company in San Pedro and he opened a chain of laundry shops. With a handful of partners, Keisaburo established North America Tuna Canning Company near San Pedro to process the catch of 39 Japanese American commercial vessels. After selling the tuna cannery he founded Golden West Canning Company in Los Angeles to process vegetables. Keisaburo eventually sold this business to pursue farming in Sutter County and revisit his familial roots in rice, leasing land in the Knight's Landing area in the late 1910s.

In the late 1920s, Keisaburo and his family moved to the San Joaquin Valley town of Dos Palos in central California to start a new farming venture. Keisaburo formed State Farming Co., Inc. with his American-born children as stockholders to comply with the Alien Land Law of 1913. This law denied “aliens ineligible to citizenship” the right to own land in California. (As part of a general anti-Asian trend spreading along the West Coast, Asians immigrants were the only racial group defined as “aliens ineligible to citizenship.”)

=== 1940s ===
An innovator in the rice industry, Keisaburo helped pioneer rice growing techniques such as sowing seed with airplanes. By the early 1940s, his integrated farming operation included a modern rice dryer and mill that allowed complete quality control from seed to store shelf. Due to his success, Keisaburo became widely known among Japanese Americans as the “Rice King.” The outbreak of war with Japan in 1941 led to passage of Executive Order 9066 which relocated Americans of Japanese descent to internment centers away from the West Coast. After receiving notification of their relocation to Amache, Colorado, the Koda family planned to close their operation until they could return. The United States government, however, mandated that their business be kept running to produce food and fiber. This forced Keisaburo to entrust management to strangers since his friends on neighboring farms were busy overseeing their own operations during the wartime agricultural boom.

When Japanese Americans were freed from the internment camps, the Koda family immediately headed back to Dos Palos to see what had become of their farm. They returned to find it stripped bare. Land, dryer, mill, mechanized equipment and planes had been liquidated, along with their homes and livestock (a thriving hog farm).

=== Post war years ===
The post war reconstruction of the business was assigned to Keisaburo's sons. Edward (Ed was enrolled at UC Berkeley, but never returned to complete his undergraduate degree) and William (Bill completed his undergraduate at UC Davis before the internment) built another processing facility a quarter mile from their original homestead and gradually repurchased landholdings. In the late 1940s, the Koda brothers took note of an unfulfilled market niche for “sweet rice.” They became the first commercial growers of sweet rice in California and developed the American market for this rice and its flour.

Approximately ten years later, a rice-breeding program was established at the farm that resulted in a unique variety of rice that Keisaburo named Kokuho Rose®. In 1963, Kokuho Rose was introduced to the domestic market as the first premium “medium” grain rice. Unique in appearance as well as flavor, Kokuho Rose quickly became established as the favorite of Japanese Americans throughout the country.

While his sons orchestrated State Farming's rebirth as Bill and Ed Koda Farms, Keisaburo focused his time and energy on improving the welfare of Japanese Americans.

=== Working for Japanese Americans ===
Before and after the war, he was a major financial supporter and active member of the JACL (Japanese American Citizens League), the nation's oldest and largest Asian American civil rights group. He launched the People's Rights Protection Association in 1945 specifically to lobby against the notorious Alien Land Law (declared unconstitutional in 1948). In 1947, he organized the Naturalization Rights League and served as president. Also in the late 1940s, he helped start a Japanese American owned and operated insurance company to provide full coverage to Americans of Japanese descent. Recognizing the need for equal treatment in banking, Keisaburo was instrumental in opening California's first Bank of Tokyo branch of which he became a founding director in 1952.

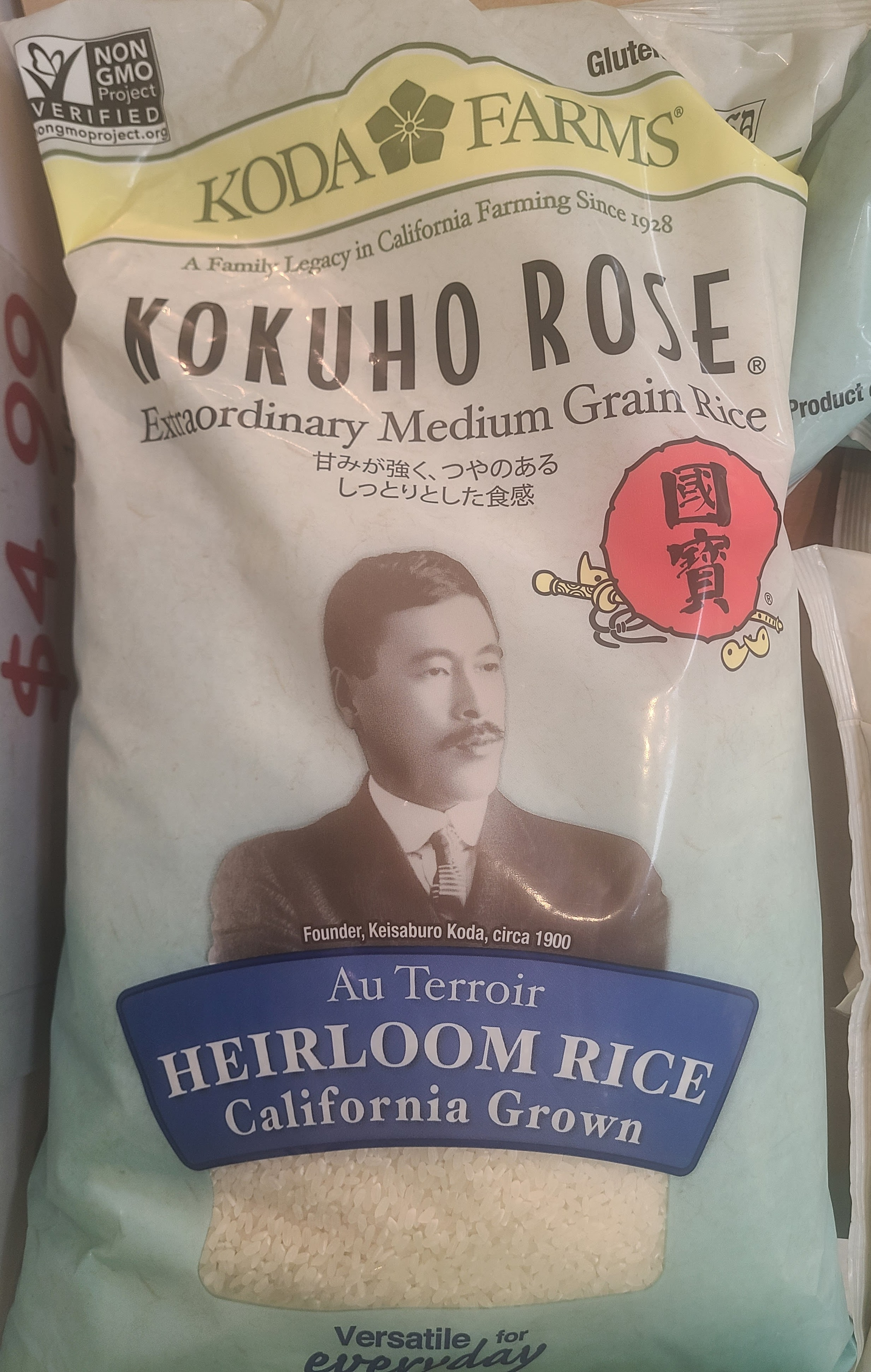
A bag of Kokuho Rose rice

In the early 1950s, to promote better relations between the United States and Japan, Keisaburo established the California Farming Trainees and the Japanese Farming Youth programs that brought Japanese trainees to the United States to study American agriculture.

== Management ==
Koda Farms is still owned and operated by the grandchildren of Keisaburo, Robin Koda and Ross Koda.

== Products ==
- Kokuho Rose, an heirloom rice strain
- Sho-chiku-bai, Japanese glutinous rice, also called mochigome
- Mochiko sweet rice flour, glutinous short grain rice flour
- Diamond K rice flour, medium grain rice flour
- Kokuho Rose rice flour

== See also ==
- Koda (Shinto)
