= List of Jewish cemeteries in the United States =

The list of Jewish cemeteries in the United States includes both active and historic sites. The list is for notable Jewish cemeteries, and is not an attempt to list all the Jewish cemeteries in the United States. The listed may include large cemeteries that contain only portions of Jewish burials.

== Alabama ==
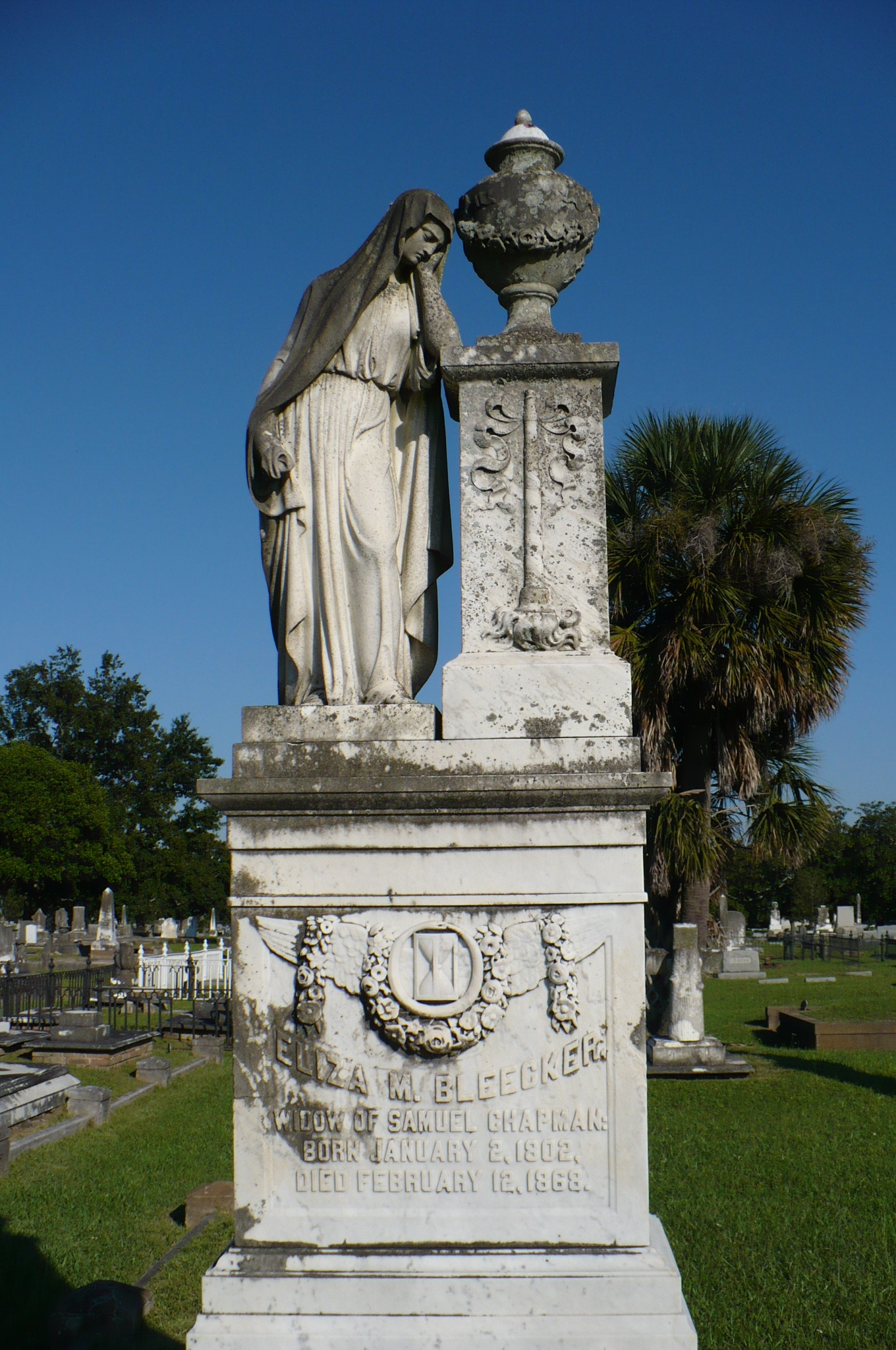
Magnolia Cemetery in Mobile, Alabama

- Ahavas Chesed Cemetery (Mobile)
- Magnolia Cemetery (Mobile)
- Sha'arai Shomayim Cemetery (Mobile)

== California ==
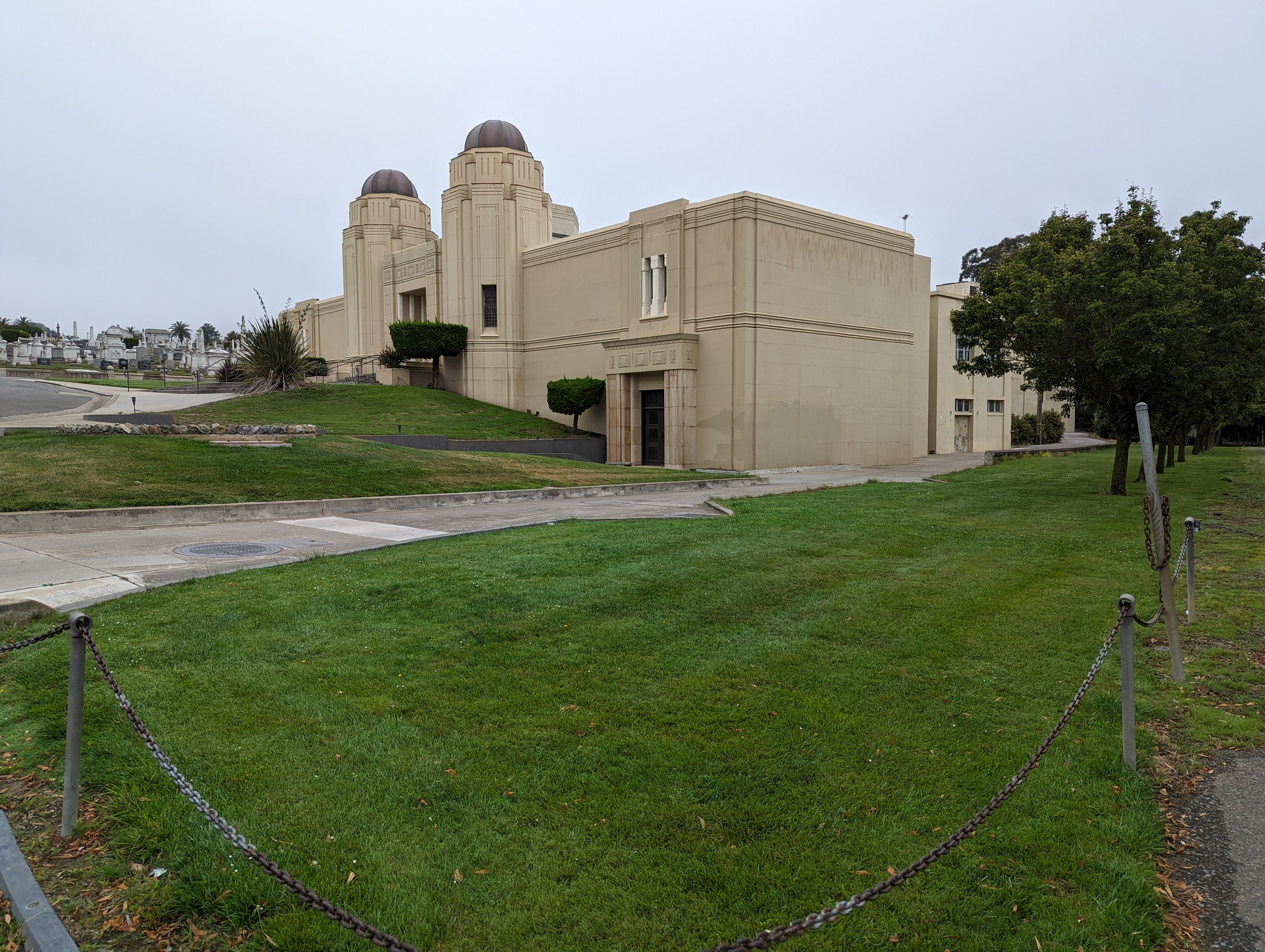
Hills of Eternity Memorial Park in Colma, California

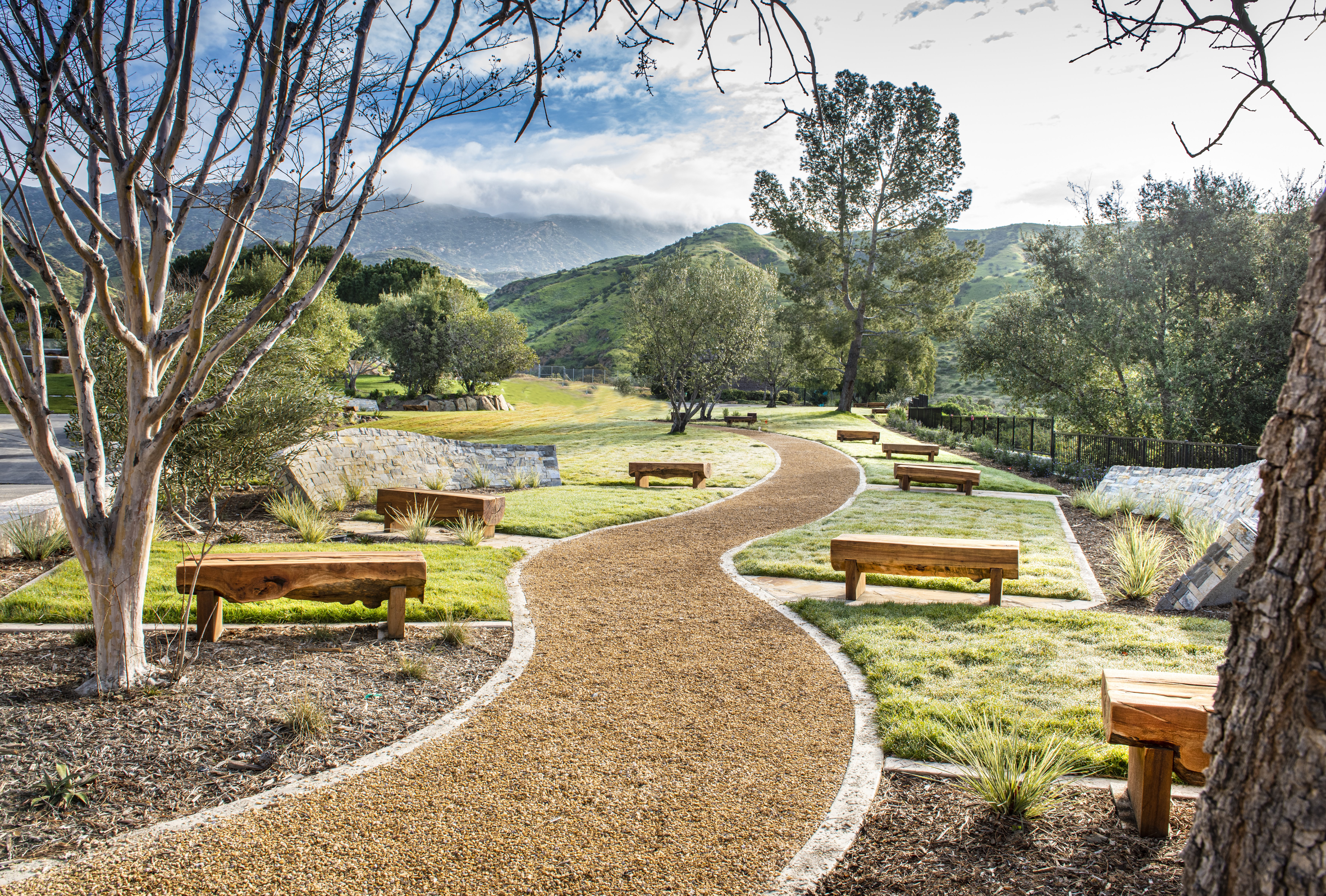
Mount Sinai Memorial Park in Hollywood Hills, Los Angeles, California, view of the green burial park

- Chevra Kaddisha Cemetery in Sacramento, California
- Eden Memorial Park Cemetery (Los Angeles)
- First Jewish site in Los Angeles (Los Angeles); CHL-listed
- Grass Valley Pioneer Jewish Cemetery (Grass Valley)
- Hills of Eternity Memorial Park (Colma)
- Hillside Memorial Park Cemetery (Culver City)
- Home of Peace Cemetery (Colma)
- Home of Peace Cemetery (Sacramento)
- Home of Peace Cemetery (Santa Cruz)
- Home of Peace Cemetery (Los Angeles)
- Jackson Pioneer Jewish Cemetery (Jackson)
- Marysville Cemetery (Marysville)
- Marysville Hebrew Cemetery (Marysville)
- Mount Sinai Memorial Park (Hollywood Hills, Los Angeles)
- Mount Sinai Simi Valley (Simi Valley)
- Mount Zion Cemetery (Los Angeles)
- Nevada City Jewish Cemetery (Nevada City)
- Placerville Pioneer Jewish Cemetery (Placerville)
- Salem Memorial Park (Colma)
- Sonora Hebrew Cemetery (Sonora)

== Connecticut ==
- Congregation Knesseth Israel (Ellington)

== Florida ==
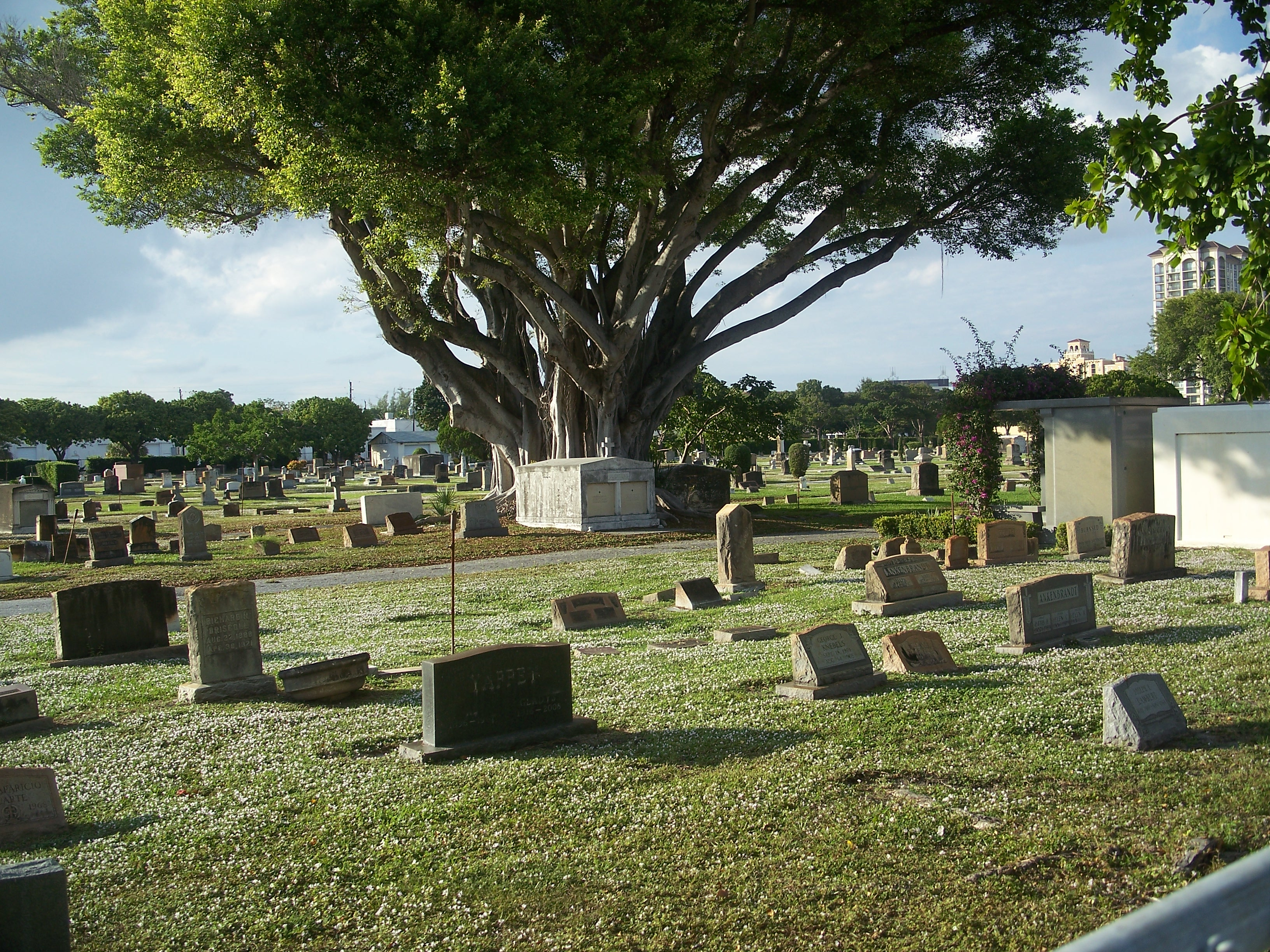
Woodlawn Cemetery in West Palm Beach, Florida

- Woodlawn Cemetery (West Palm Beach)

== Georgia (U.S. state) ==
- B'nai Israel Synagogue and Cemetery (Thomasville)
- Bull Street Cemetery (Savannah)
- Levi Sheftall Family Cemetery (Savannah)
- Mordecai Sheftall Cemetery (Savannah)

== Illinois ==
- Arlington Cemetery (Elmhurst)
- Jewish Graceland Cemetery (Hebrew Benevolent Society Cemetery) (Chicago)
- Rosehill Cemetery (Chicago)
- Waldheim Jewish Cemeteries (Forest Park)
- Westlawn Cemetery (Norridge)
- Zion Gardens Cemetery (Chicago)

== Iowa ==
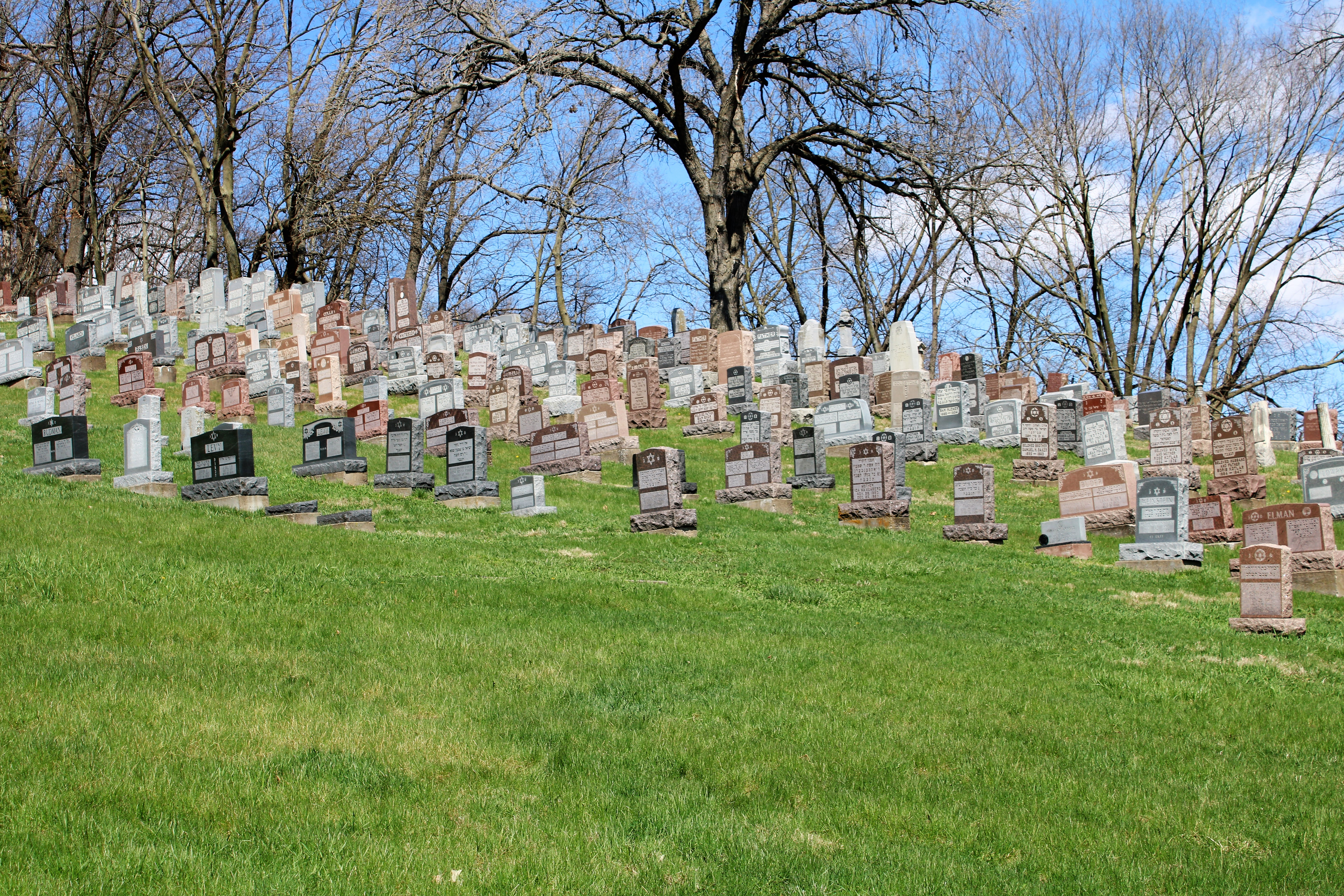
Tri-City Jewish Cemetery in Davenport, Iowa

- Tri-City Jewish Cemetery (Davenport)

== Kansas ==
- Beni Israel Cemetery (Eudora)

== Louisiana ==
- Dispersed of Judah Cemetery (New Orleans)

== Massachusetts ==
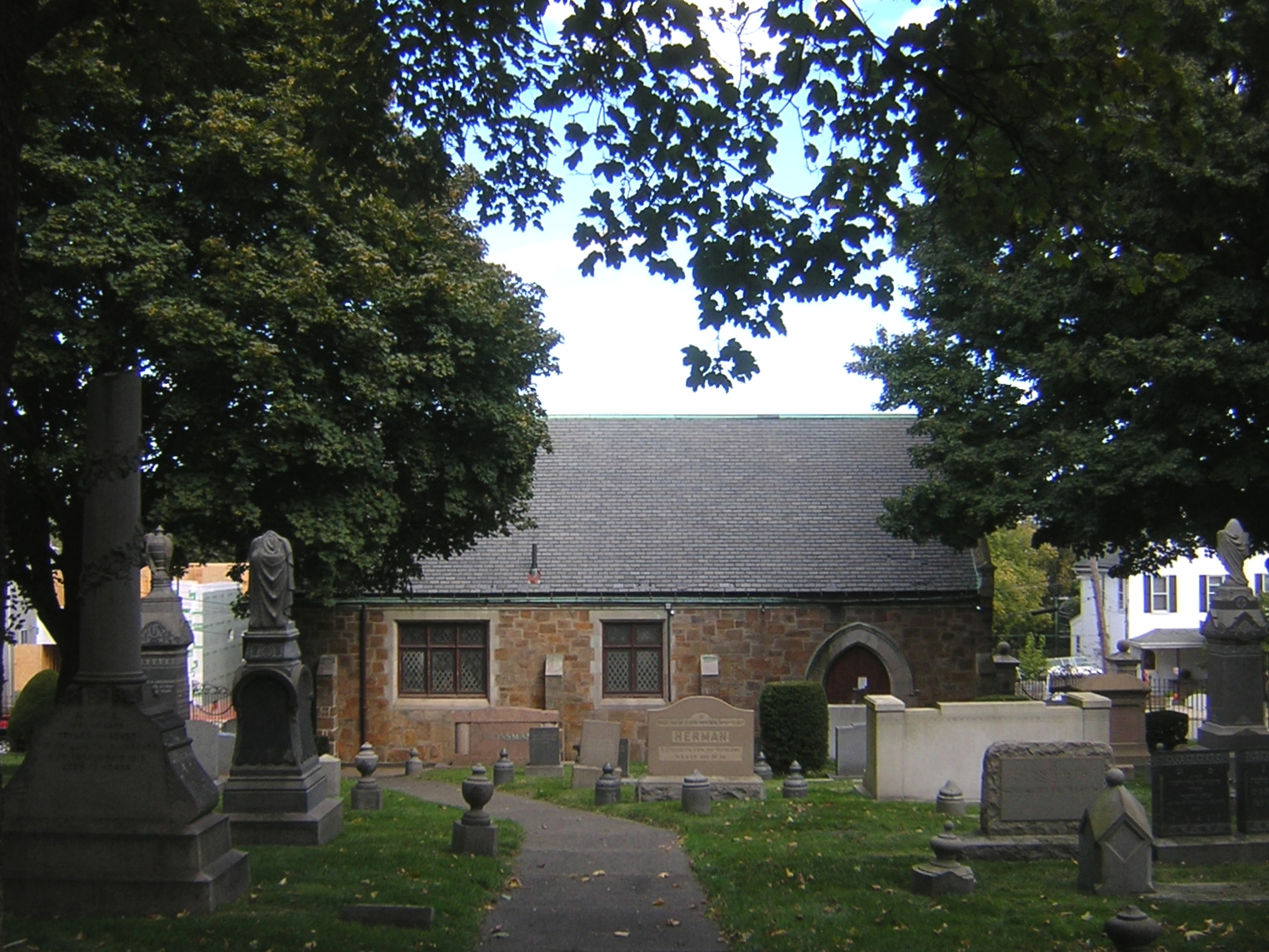
Temple Ohabei Shalom Cemetery in East Boston, Massachusetts

- Baker Street Jewish Cemeteries (West Roxbury)
- Jewish Cemetery of New Bedford (New Bedford); NRHP-listed
- Sharon Memorial Park, Massachusetts (Sharon)
- Temple Israel Cemetery (Wakefield)
- Temple Ohabei Shalom Cemetery (East Boston); NRHP-listed

== Michigan ==
- Ahavas Israel Cemetery (Grand Rapids)
- Beth El Memorial Park Cemetery (Livonia)
- Lafayette Cemetery of Temple Beth El (Detroit)
- Woodmere Cemetery (Detroit)

== Mississippi ==
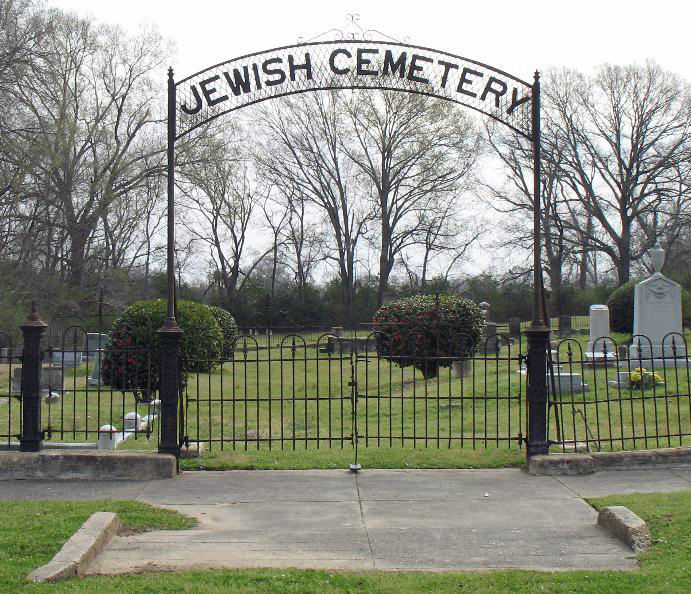
Jewish Cemetery in Port Gibson, Mississippi

- Anshe Chesed Cemetery (Vicksburg); NRHP-listed
- Congregation Beth Israel (Meridian); NRHP-listed
- Jewish Cemetery (Port Gibson); NRHP-listed

== Missouri ==
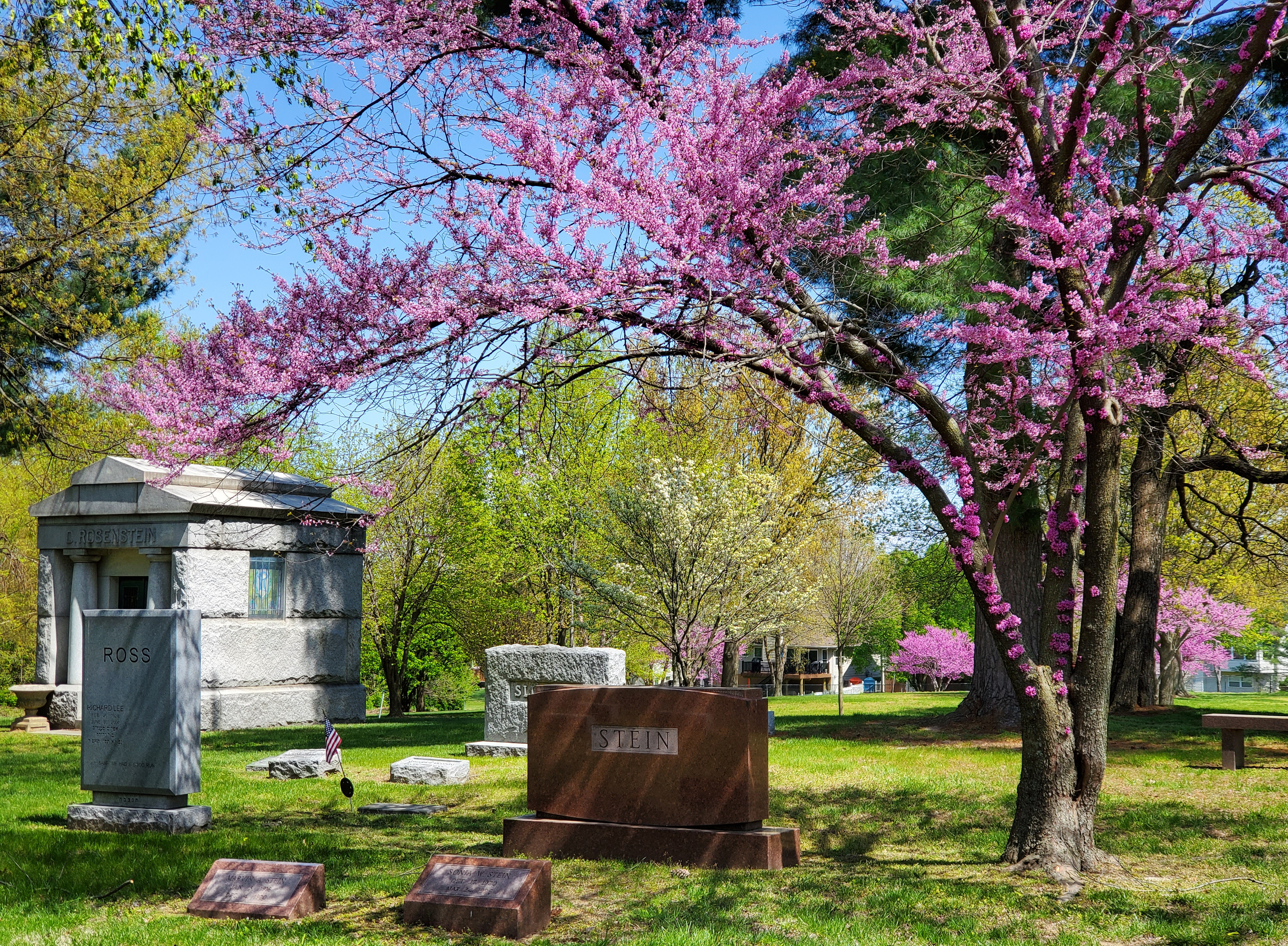
New Mount Sinai Cemetery in St. Louis, Missouri

- B'nai Amoona Cemetery (University City)
- Chesed Shel Emeth Cemetery (University City)
- New Mount Sinai Cemetery (St. Louis); NRHP-listed

== Montana ==
- Home of Peace Cemetery (Helena); NRHP-listed

== Nebraska ==
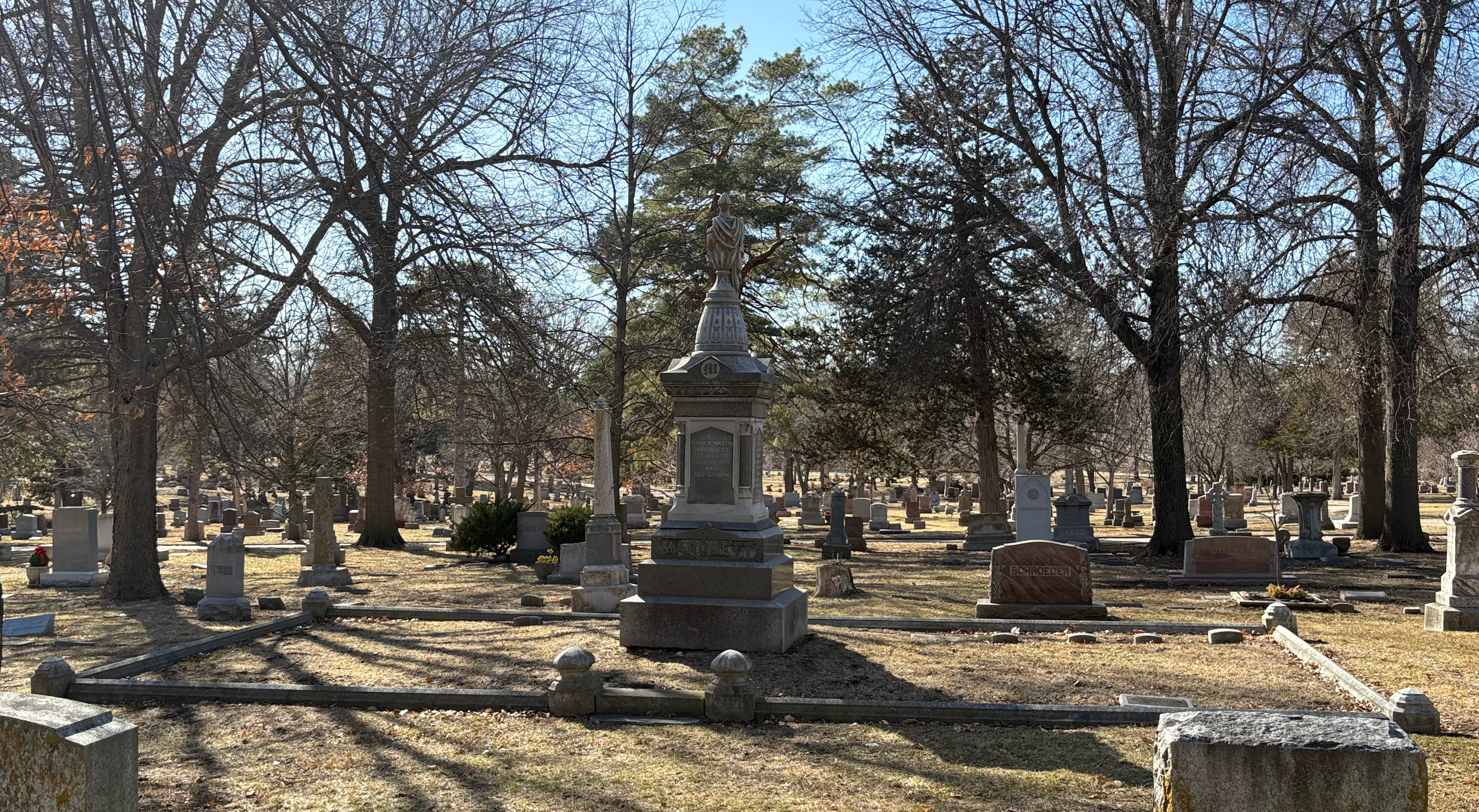
Wyuka Cemetery in Lincoln, Nebraska

- Beth El Cemetery (Ralston)
- Beth Hamedrosh Hagodol Cemetery (Bellevue)
- Golden Hill Jewish Cemetery (North Omaha)
- Mt. Carmel Cemetery (Lincoln)
- Temple Israel Cemetery (Omaha)
- Wyuka Cemetery (Lincoln); NRHP-listed

== New Jersey ==
- Cedar Park Cemetery, New Jersey (Emerson and Paramus)
- Floral Park Cemetery (South Brunswick)
- King Solomon Memorial Park (Clifton)
- Mount Moriah Cemetery (Fairview)
- Riverside Cemetery (Saddle Brook)

=== Newark ===
- Grove Street Cemetery
- McClellan Street Cemeteries

- Beth El Memorial Park

- Talmud Torah Cemetery
- Union Field

== New York ==
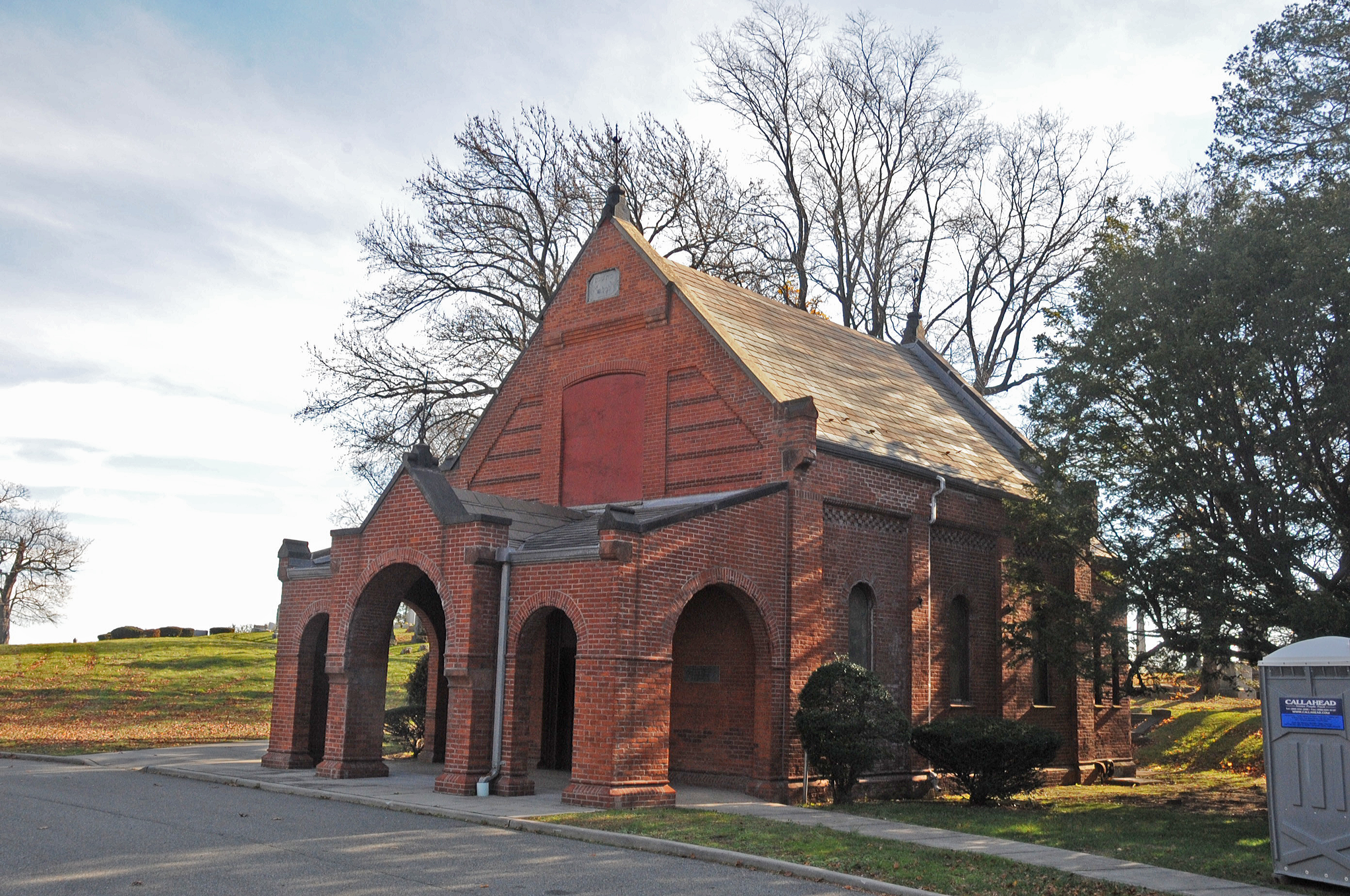
Beth Olam Cemetery in Brooklyn, New York City

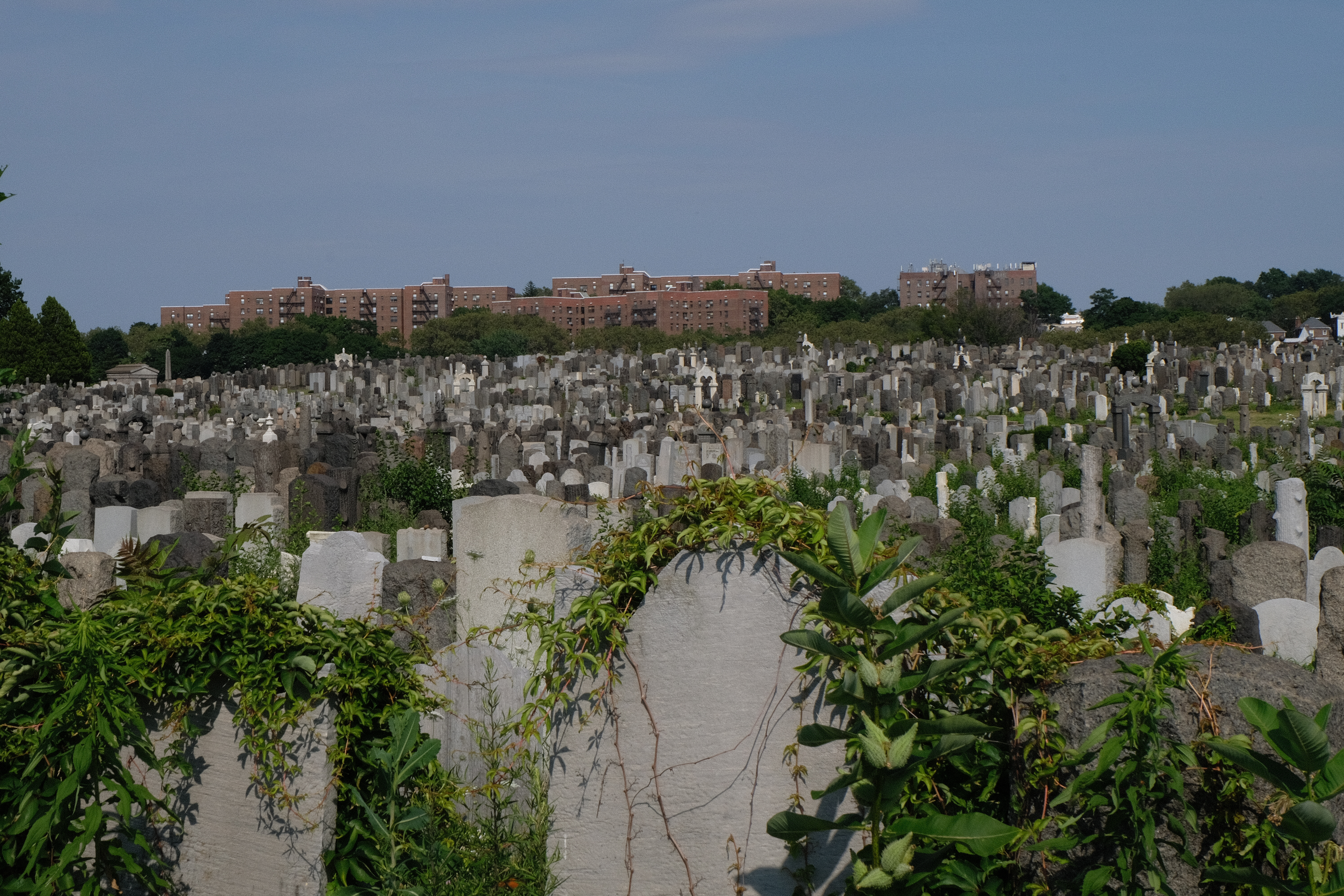
Mount Zion Cemetery in Queens, New York City

- Beth David Cemetery (Elmont)
- New Montefiore Cemetery (West Babylon)
- Wellwood Cemetery (West Babylon)
- Westchester Hills Cemetery (Hastings-on-Hudson)

=== New York City ===
- Baron Hirsch Cemetery (Staten Island)
- Bayside Cemetery (Queens)
- Beth Olam Cemetery (Brooklyn)
- Congregation Shaare Zedek Cemetery (Manhattan)
- First Shearith Israel Graveyard (Manhattan); NRHP-listed and NYCL-listed
- Machpelah Cemetery (Queens)
- Montefiore Cemetery (Queens)
- Mount Hebron Cemetery (Queens)
- Mount Zion Cemetery (Queens)
- Salem Fields Cemetery (Brooklyn)
- Union Field Cemetery (Queens)
- Washington Cemetery (Brooklyn)

== North Carolina ==
- Historic Oakwood Cemetery (Raleigh); NRHP-listed

== North Dakota ==
- Ashley Jewish Homesteaders Cemetery (Ashley); NRHP-listed
- B'nai Israel Synagogue and Montefiore Cemetery (Grand Forks); NRHP-listed
- Sons of Jacob Cemetery (Ramsey County); NRHP-listed

== Ohio ==
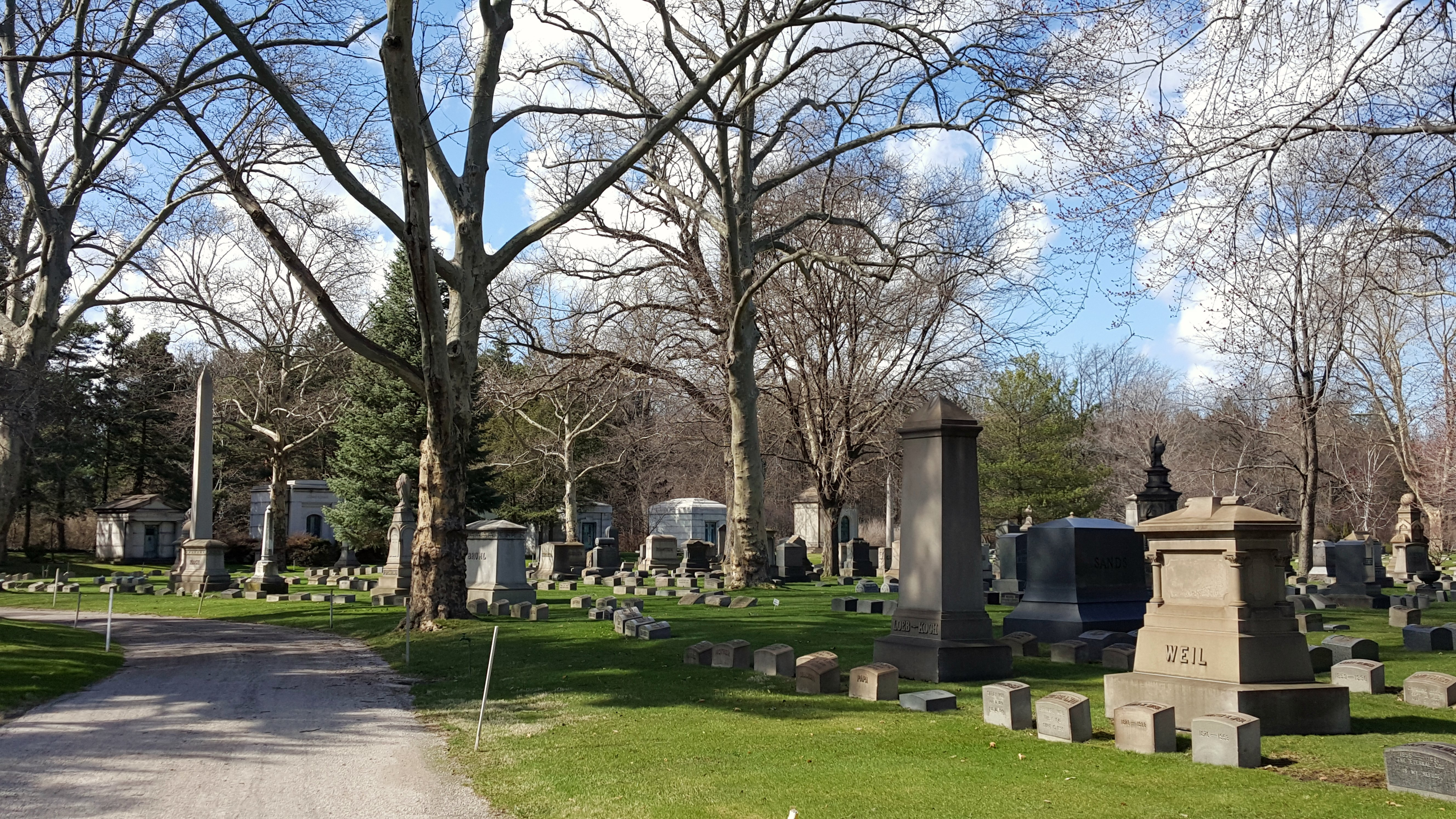
Mayfield Cemetery in Cleveland Heights, Ohio

- Hillcrest Cemetery (Bedford Heights)
- Mayfield Cemetery (Cleveland Heights)
- Old Jewish Cemetery, Cincinnati (Cincinnati)
- United Jewish Cemetery (Evanston)
- Woodlawn Cemetery (Toledo)

== Oregon ==
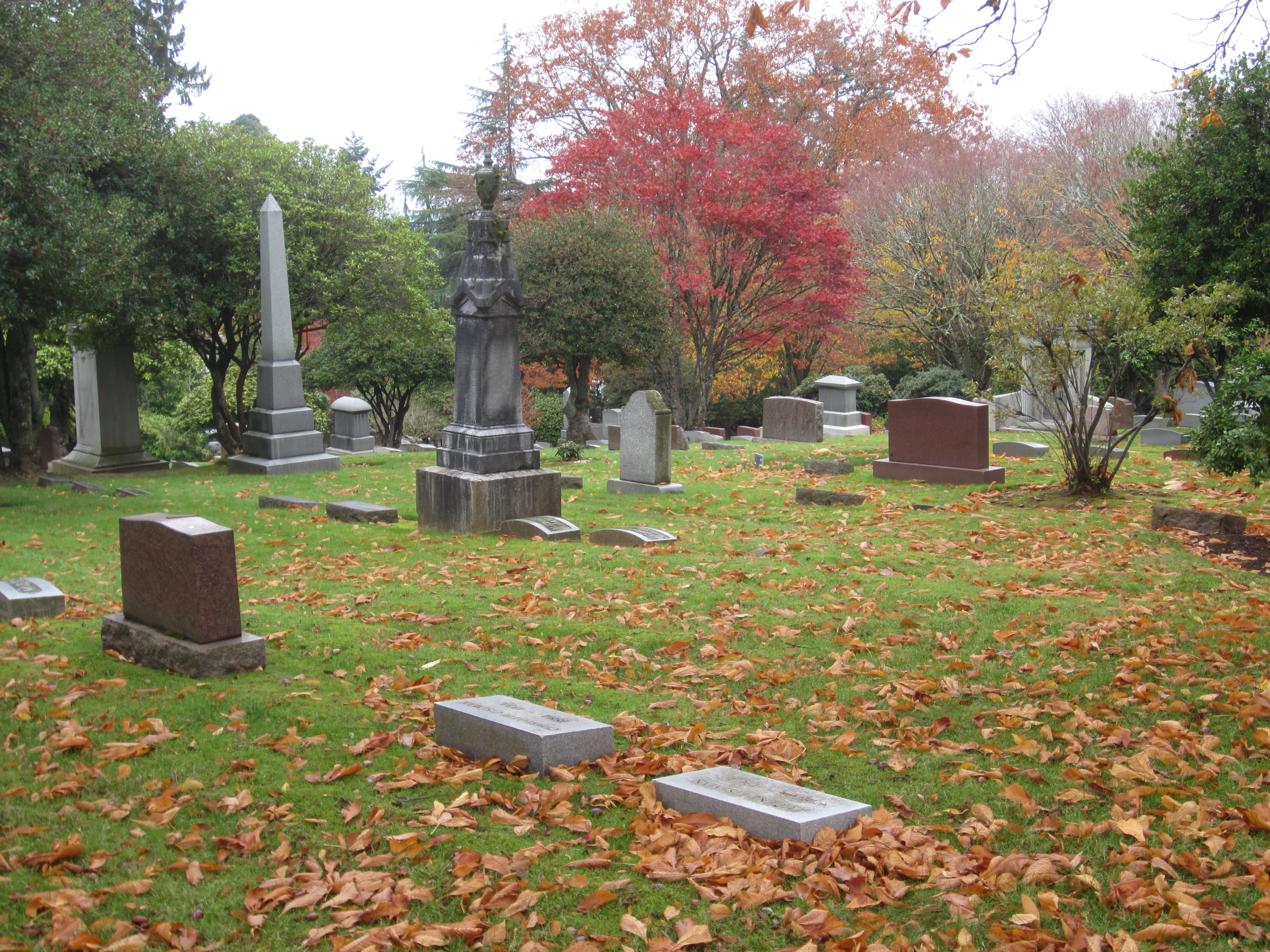
Beth Israel Cemetery in Portland, Oregon

- Beth Israel Cemetery (Portland)
- Congregation Shaarie Torah Cemetery (Portland)

== Pennsylvania ==
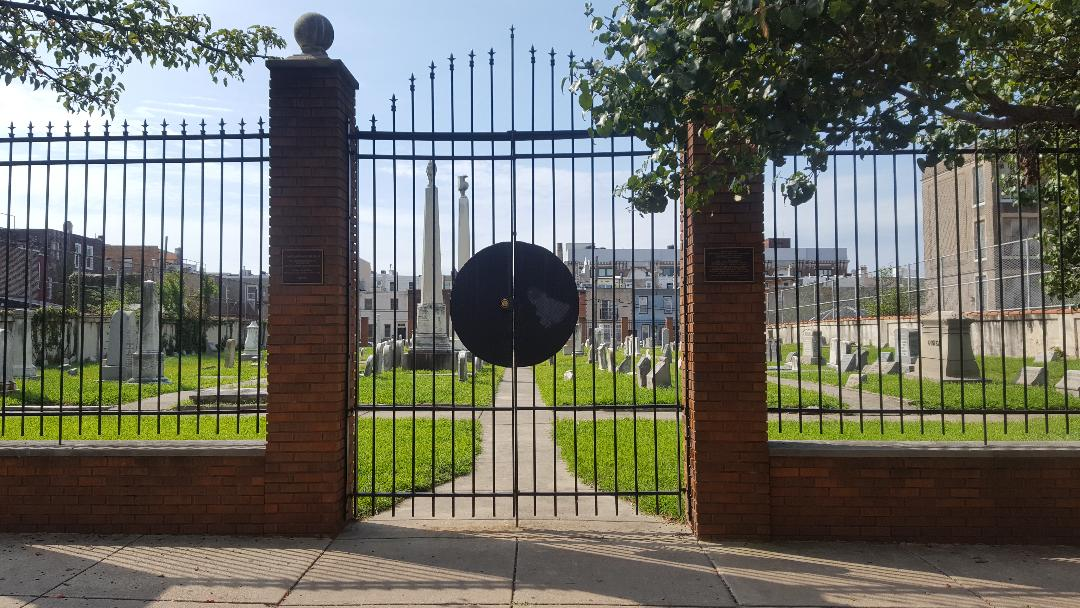
Mikveh Israel Cemetery (Federal Street Burial Ground) in South Philadelphia, Pennsylvania

- Beth Abraham Cemetery (Carrick, Pittsburgh)
- Beth Israel Congregation of Chester County (Upper Uwchlan Township)
- Har Jehuda Cemetery (Upper Darby)
- Israel Benevolent Society Cemetery (Chambersburg)
- West Laurel Hill Cemetery (Bala Cynwyd)

=== Philadelphia ===
- Har Nebo Cemetery (Oxford Circle)
- Mikveh Israel Cemetery; NRHP-listed and PSHM-listed
- Mikveh Israel Cemetery (Beth El Emeth) (West Philadelphia)
- Mikveh Israel Cemetery (Federal Street Burial Ground) (South Philadelphia)
- Mt. Carmel Cemetery (Wissinoming)

== Rhode Island ==
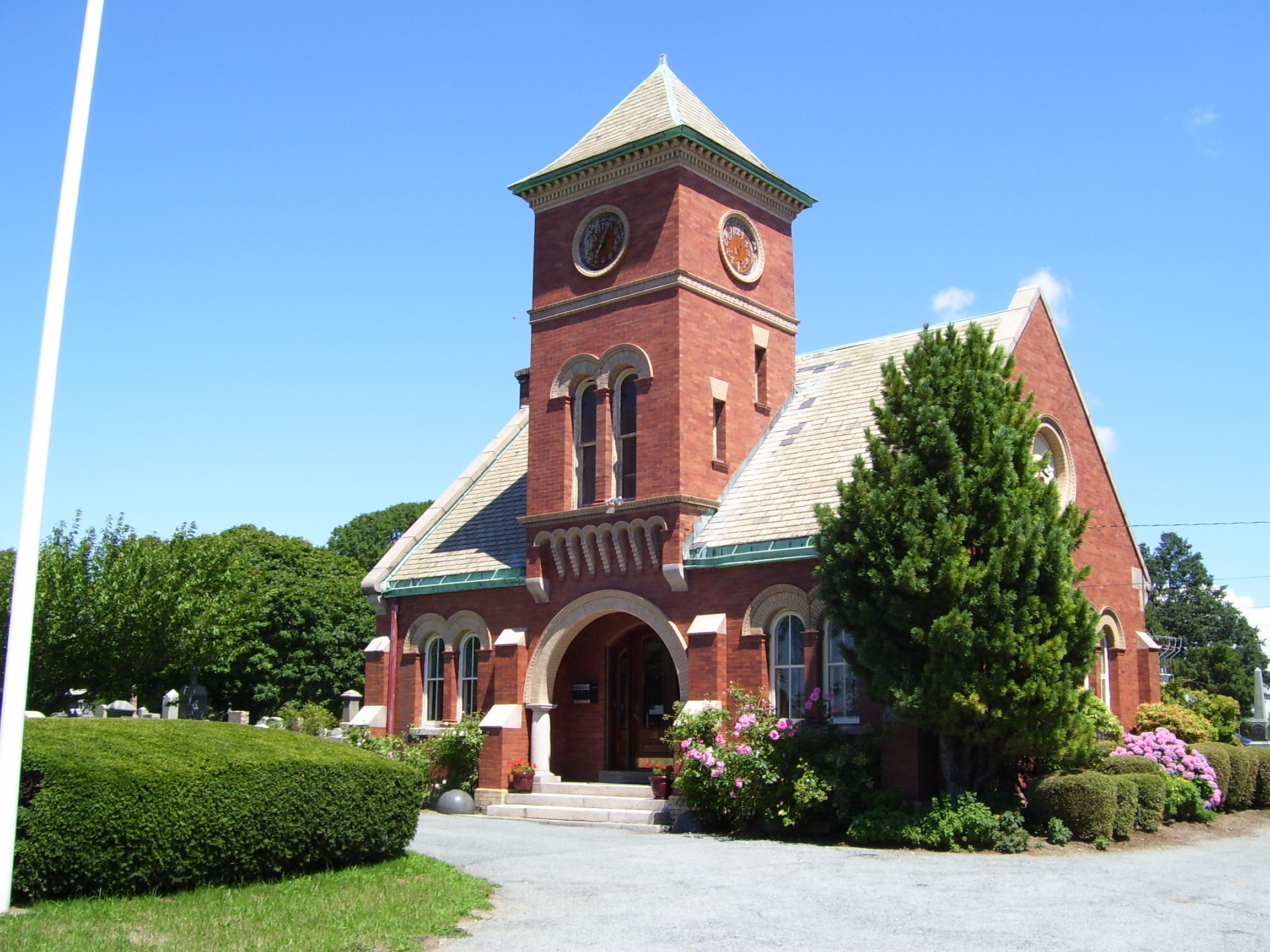
Common Burying Ground and Island Cemetery in Newport, Rhode Island

- Common Burying Ground and Island Cemetery (Newport); NRHP-listed
- Touro Cemetery (Newport)

== South Carolina ==
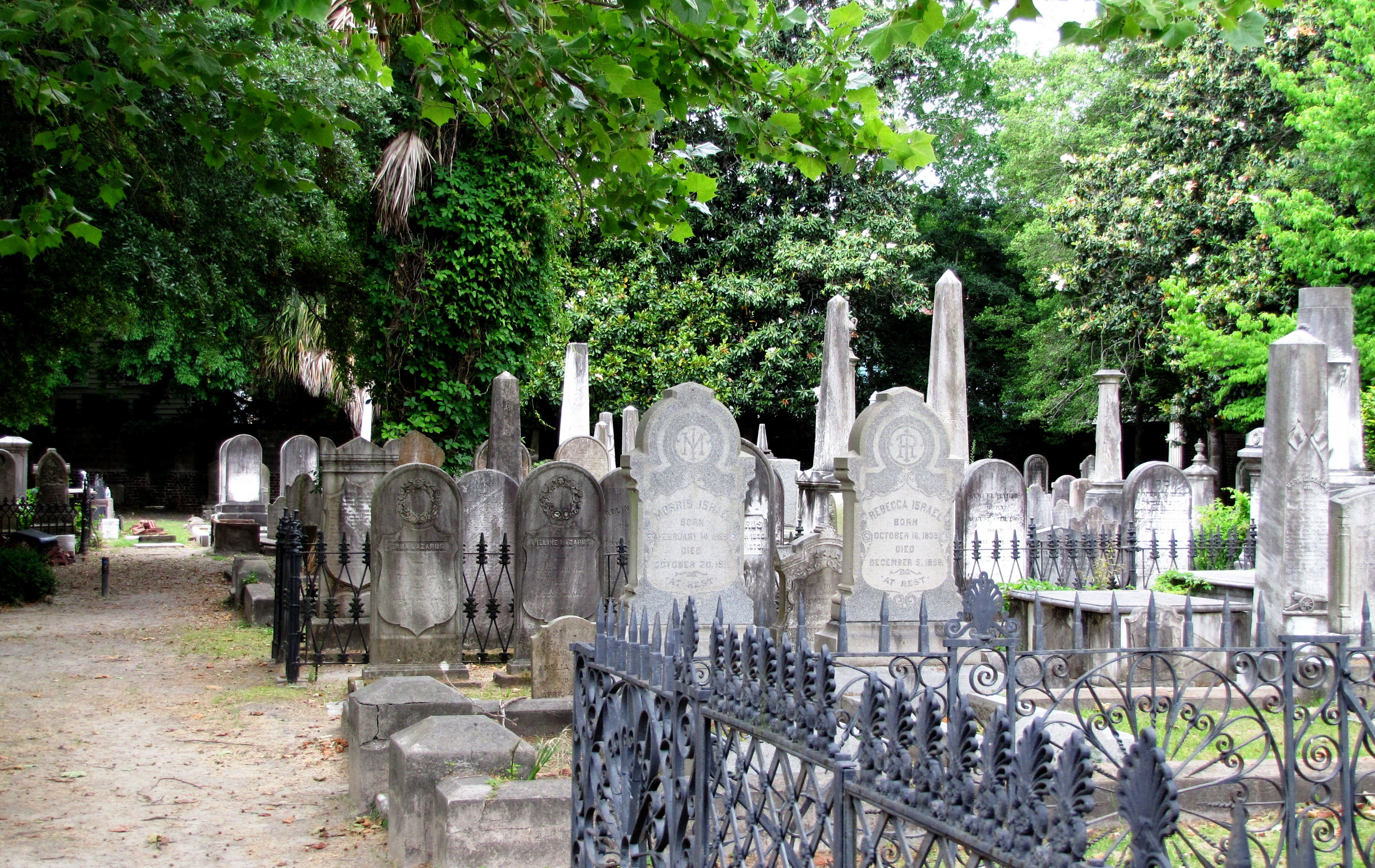
Coming Street Cemetery in Charleston, South Carolina

- Coming Street Cemetery (Charleston); NRHP-listed

== Tennessee ==
- Temple Adas Israel (Brownsville); NRHP-listed
- Temple Cemetery (Nashville); NRHP-listed

== Texas ==
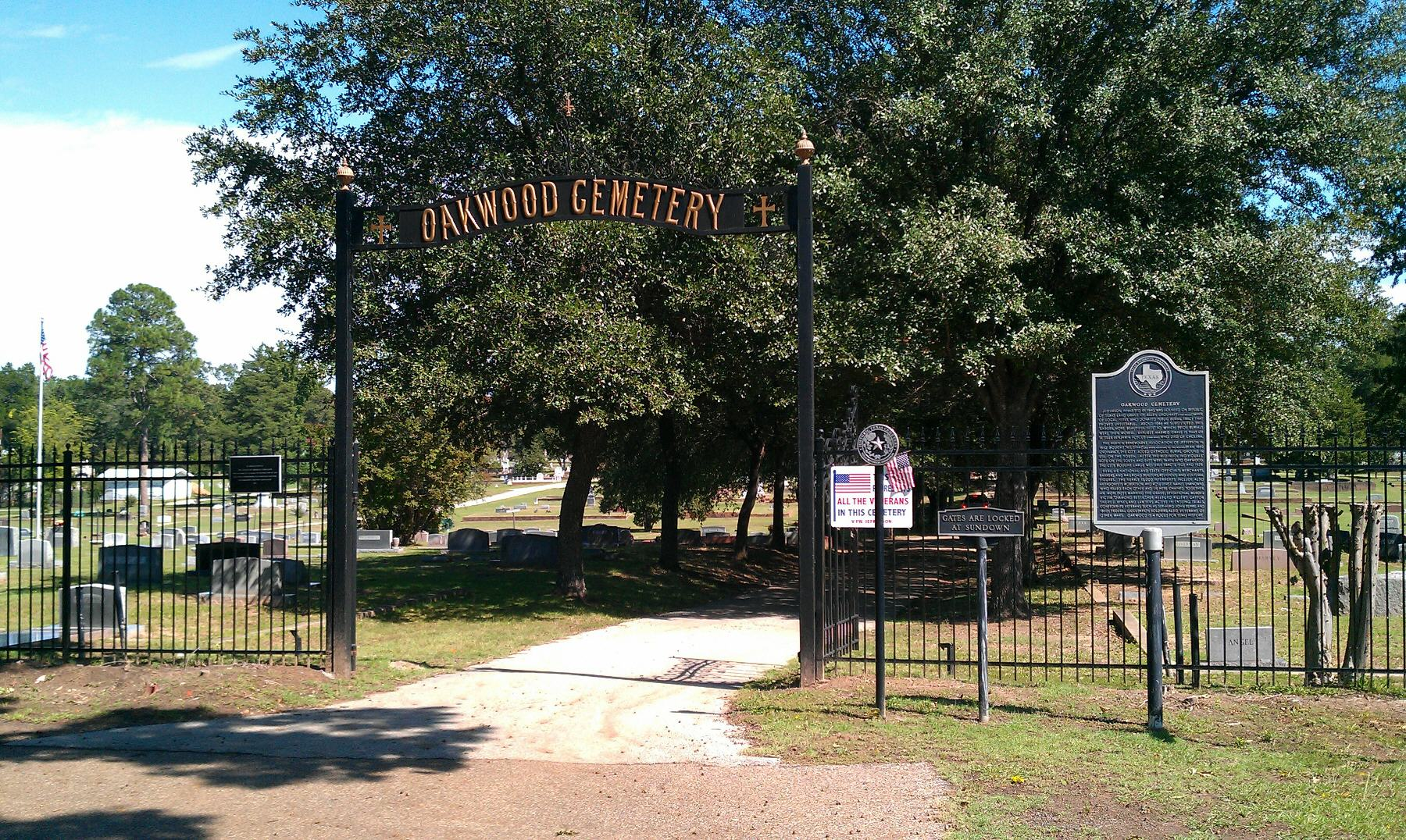
Oakwood Cemetery in Jefferson, Texas

- Concordia Cemetery (El Paso)
- Oakwood Cemetery (Austin); NRHP-listed
- Oakwood Cemetery (Jefferson)

== Virginia ==
- Hebrew Cemetery (Richmond); NRHP-listed and VLR-listed

== West Virginia ==
- Mt. Woods Cemetery (Wheeling); NRHP-listed

== See also ==
- List of cemeteries in the United States
- List of rural cemeteries in the United States
- United States National Cemetery System
