= Pioneer cemetery =

Type of cemetery

In the United States, Canada, Australia, and elsewhere, a pioneer cemetery is a cemetery that is the burial place for pioneers. American pioneers founded such cemeteries during territorial expansion of the United States, with founding dates spanning, at least, from the late 18th to early 20th centuries.

A number of these have been officially designated as historic sites worthy of preservation, including at least 10 listed on the U.S. National Register of Historic Places (NRHP).

== Definitions ==
The State of Iowa defines "pioneer cemetery" as "a cemetery where twelve or fewer burials have taken place in the past 50 years".

The State of Nebraska defines an "abandoned or neglected pioneer cemetery" as having been founded or situated upon land that "was given, granted, donated, sold, or deeded to the founders of the cemetery prior to January 1, 1900", and that "contains the grave or graves of a person or persons who were homesteaders, immigrants from a foreign nation, prairie farmers, pioneers, sodbusters, first generation Nebraskans, or Civil War veterans".

The State of Oregon defines a "pioneer cemetery" as "any burial place that contains the remains of one or more persons who died before February 14, 1909", which is the 50th anniversary of Oregon's statehood.

California recognizes that pioneer cemeteries may have become the responsibility of a public cemetery district or may be dedicated by the city or county as a pioneer memorial park if no longer maintained. The law also authorizes the "removal of such copings, improvements, and embellishments which the governing board finds to be a threat or danger to the health, safety, comfort, or welfare of the public."

== List of pioneer cemeteries ==
Dates are of official founding or earliest known burial.

=== Australia ===
- Memorial Park Cemetery (1836), Albany, Western Australia; also known as Pioneer Cemetery

=== Canada ===
- Buxton Pioneer Cemetery (1859–2015), Chatham-Kent, Ontario
- Pioneers Cemetery in Stanley Park (c. 1886), Stanley Park, Vancouver, British Columbia
- St. Mary's Pioneer Cemetery (1876), Calgary, Alberta
- Whitehorse Pioneer Cemetery (1900)

=== United States ===
==== Arizona ====
- Adamsville A.O.U.W. Cemetery (1894), Pinal County
- Double Butte Cemetery (1888), Tempe; whose pioneer section is NRHP-listed
- Fry Pioneer Cemetery (1919), Sierra Vista; NRHP-listed in Cochise County
- Henry Wickenburg Pioneer Cemetery (1902), Wickenburg; NRHP-listed in Maricopa County
- Hardyville Cemetery (c. 1867), Bullhead City
- Pioneer and Military Memorial Park (1871), Phoenix, Arizona
- Evergreen Cemetery (c. 1912), Bisbee
- Pioneer Cemetery, Bisbee

==== Arkansas ====
- Palarm Bayou Pioneer Cemetery (c. 1837), Morgan, Arkansas, NRHP-listed

==== California ====
- Centerville Pioneer Cemetery (1850s), Fremont
- Chevra Kaddisha Cemetery, Sacramento (1850), first Jewish cemetery in the state
- Dublin Pioneer Cemetery (1859), Dublin
- Evergreen Cemetery (1877), Los Angeles
- Evergreen Cemetery (1850s), Santa Cruz
- Golden Gate Cemetery (1870–1909), San Francisco
- Grass Valley Pioneer Jewish Cemetery (1856–1891), Grass Valley
- Haven of Rest (1870s), Julian
- Holy Cross Cemetery (1887), Colma
- Holy Cross Cemetery (1860s), Menlo Park
- Jackson Pioneer Jewish Cemetery (1857), Jackson
- Lone Mountain Cemetery (1854), San Francisco; which had included four cemeteries within the complex.
- Long Beach Municipal Cemetery (c. 1901), Signal Hill
- Marysville Hebrew Cemetery (1855), Marysville
- Mount Eden Cemetery (1860), Hayward
- New Helvetia Cemetery (c. 1845), Sacramento
- Nevada City Jewish Cemetery (1854), Nevada City
- Pioneer Cemetery (c. 1851), Nevada City
- Pioneer Cemetery (c. 1851), San Andreas
- Pioneer Memorial Cemetery (1857), San Bernardino
- Placerville Pioneer Jewish Cemetery (1854), Placerville
- Placerville Union Cemetery (1871), Placerville
- Oak Hill Memorial Park, San Jose (1847), the oldest secular cemetery in California
- San Fernando Pioneer Memorial Cemetery (1850s), Los Angeles
- San Lorenzo Pioneer Memorial Park, also known as San Lorenzo Pioneer Cemetery, San Lorenzo (managed by the Hayward Area Historical Society)
- Santa Clara Mission Cemetery (1777), Santa Clara
- Sierra Madre Pioneer Cemetery (1882), Sierra Madre
- Sonora Hebrew Cemetery (c. 1851), Sonora
- Union Cemetery (1859), Redwood City
- Woodlawn Memorial Park Cemetery, Colma (1905), many early graves from San Francisco were relocated here.
- Yosemite Cemetery (1870s), Mariposa County
- Odd Fellows or Masonic Pioneer (1865), Fallbrook

==== Florida ====
- Houston Pioneer Cemetery (1883), Eau Gallie

==== Indiana ====
- Pioneer Cemetery (part of Lincoln Boyhood National Memorial and gravesite of Nancy Hanks Lincoln), Lincoln City

==== Maine ====
- Pioneer Cemetery (1731), Yarmouth

==== Nebraska ====
- Mormon Pioneer Cemetery (1840s), Omaha
- Prospect Hill Cemetery (1856), Omaha

==== New York ====
- Pioneer Cemetery, Canandaigua
- Pioneer Cemetery (1810), Evans Center; NRHP-listed
- Pioneer Cemetery (1787), Sidney; NRHP-listed

==== Ohio ====
- Pioneer Memorial Cemetery (1790), Cincinnati, Ohio

==== Oregon ====
- Eugene Masonic Cemetery (1859), Eugene; NRHP-listed
- Eugene Pioneer Cemetery (1872), Eugene; NRHP-listed
- Fernwood Pioneer Cemetery, Newberg; NRHP-listed
- Grand Army of the Republic Cemetery (1882), Portland
- Gresham Pioneer Cemetery (1859), Gresham
- Hargadine Cemetery (1867), Ashland
- Hillsboro Pioneer Cemetery (1870), Hillsboro
- Lebanon Pioneer Cemetery, Lebanon; NRHP-listed
- Lee Mission Cemetery (1842), Salem
- Lone Fir Cemetery (1855), Portland
- River View Cemetery (1882), Portland
- Salem Pioneer Cemetery (1850s), Salem

==== Texas ====
- Der Stadt Friedhof (1846), Fredericksburg
- Founders Memorial Cemetery (1836), Houston
- Pioneer Park Cemetery (1849), Dallas

==== Washington ====
- Bothell Pioneer Cemetery (1889), Bothell; NRHP-listed
- Chamber's Prairie-Ruddell Pioneer Cemetery, Lacey; NRHP-listed, NRHP-listed in Thurston County
- Union Cemetery-Pioneer Calvary Cemetery, Tumwater; NRHP-listed, NRHP-listed in Thurston County

== See also ==
- Pioneer Jewish Cemetery
- List of cemeteries in the United States
