= Pioneer Jewish Cemetery =

Pioneer Jewish Cemetery may refer to:

- Grass Valley Pioneer Jewish Cemetery, Grass Valley, Nevada County, California
- Jackson Pioneer Jewish Cemetery, Jackson, Amador County, California
- Mokelumne Hill Pioneer Jewish Cemetery, Mokelumne Hill, Calaveras County, California
- Placerville Pioneer Jewish Cemetery, Placerville, El Dorado County, California
- Sonora Hebrew Cemetery, also known as Pioneer Jewish Cemetery, Sonora, Tuolumne County, California

== See also ==
- Hebrew Cemetery (disambiguation)
- Pioneer cemetery (disambiguation)
