= Pioneer Jewish Synagogue =

Jewish synagogue in United States

- Location of the demolished synagogue in California

Religion
- Affiliation: Judaism (1857–1888)
- Ecclesiastical or organizational status: Synagogue (1857–1869); Schoolhouse (1869–1888); Residence (1888–1948)
- Status: Demolished (1948)

Location
- Location: SE corner of Church and Main streets, Jackson, California
- Country: United States
- Interactive map of Pioneer Jewish Synagogue
- Coordinates: 38°21′04″N 120°46′24″W

Architecture
- Founder: Congregation B'nai Israel of Jackson
- Established: 1856 (as a congregation)
- Completed: 1857
- Demolished: 1948
- Materials: Timber

California Historical Landmark
- Designated: November 11, 1973
- Reference no.: 865

The Pioneer Jewish Synagogue was a former Jewish synagogue located in Jackson in Amador County, California, in the United States. Built in 1857, the congregation vacated the building in 1869, and the former synagogue building was demolished in 1948.

== History ==
Congregation B'nai Israel of Jackson was founded in the fall of 1856, when a local Jew organized a Jewish New Year service. A San Francisco Jewish congregation helped hold the first Mother Lode country Jewish service.

Built in 1857 during the California Gold Rush, the historic wooden building was Jackson's Jewish synagogue, located on the southeast corner of Church Street and Main Street. The synagogue was dedicated on September 18, 1857, by members of Congregation B'nai Israel of Jackson. The synagogue was used till 1869, when the Congregation outgrew the building and moved its Jewish High Holy days services to the town's larger Jackson Masonic Hall built in 1854. The Jewish synagogue building was used as a schoolhouse from 1869 to 1888. In 1888 the building was moved to a nearby vacant lot and became a private home. The house was demolished in 1948.

=== Historical marker ===
At the site of the original Jackson's Jewish synagogue is a historical plaque. The plaque monument is at the Jackson Grammar School. The plaque monument was installed by the California Department of Parks and Recreation working with the Commission for the Preservation of Pioneer Jewish Cemeteries and Landmarks of the Judah L. Magnes Memorial Museum. The plaque monument was dedicated on June 27, 1976. Pioneer Jewish Synagogue is registered as California Historical Landmark No. 65. To the east of the marker is the Jackson Pioneer Jewish Cemetery founded in 1857 by the Congregation B'nai Israel and closed in 1921.

== See also ==
- California Historical Landmarks in Amador County
- Birth of a Community: Jews and the Gold Rush (1994 film)
- Hebrew Cemetery
- Judah L. Magnes Museum
