= Jackson Pioneer Jewish Cemetery =

Defunct cemetery in Almador County, California

- Interactive map of Jackson Pioneer Jewish Cemetery

Details
- Established: 1857
- Closed: 1921
- Location: Jackson, Almador County, California
- Country: United States
- Coordinates: 38.35398°N 120.77245°W
- Type: Jewish
- No. of graves: 32
- Find a Grave: Jackson Pioneer Jewish Cemetery

Jackson Pioneer Jewish Cemetery, also known as Givoth Olam (English: Hills of Eternity), is a no longer active Jewish cemetery founded in 1857 by the Congregation B'nai Israel, and is located in Jackson, Amador County, California. By 1921, the cemetery was closed.

It is a private site operated by the Commission for the Preservation of Pioneer Jewish Cemeteries and Landmarks in the West and is not open to the public.

== History ==
The Congregation B'nai Israel of Jackson erected the first synagogue in the mining districts in Jackson in September 1857 called Pioneer Jewish Synagogue, but it was only used for high holiday services. It was one of two synagogues in the Mother Lode, the other was located in Placerville. Connected to the synagogue was the cemetery. After 1868 the synagogue building was used for secular purposes, until 1869, when they moved the congregation to the larger Masonic Hall was used to accommodate their growth. The synagogue building then served as a schoolhouse until 1888. The Office of Historic Preservation for the State of California stated that the synagogue wooden structure had been moved next door in 1888, and was used as a private home until it was demolished in 1948. The location of the former synagogue become the site of the present-day Jackson Grammar School, and has a historical plaque to commemorate the site.

In 1962, the Commission for the Preservation of Pioneer Jewish Cemeteries and Landmarks in the West was formed to help with education, and restoration for all of the Jewish cemeteries in Gold County.

The site is surrounded by Cypress trees and a wrought iron fence. Across Cemetery Lane is a section of the Jackson Pioneer Cemetery (or Jackson City Cemetery) that surrounds the Jackson Pioneer Jewish Cemetery, it is also next door to Jackson Catholic Cemetery.

== Related cemeteries ==
Other 19th-century Jewish cemeteries in Northern California are located at:

- Nevada City Jewish Cemetery, Nevada City, Nevada County;
- Grass Valley Pioneer Jewish Cemetery (or Shaar Zedek), Grass Valley, Nevada County;
- Sonora Hebrew Cemetery, Sonora, Tuolumne County;
- Placerville Pioneer Jewish Cemetery, Placerville, El Dorado County;
- Marysville Hebrew Cemetery, Marysville, Yuba County;
- Mokelumne Hill Pioneer Jewish Cemetery, Mokelumne Hill, Calaveras County;
- Jewish Cemetery, Shasta, Shasta County

== See also ==
- Birth of a Community: Jews and the Gold Rush (1994 film)
- Hebrew Cemetery
- List of cemeteries in California
- List of Jewish cemeteries in the United States
- Judah L. Magnes Museum
