= Nevada City Jewish Cemetery =

Defunct Jewish cemetery in Nevada City, California

- Interactive map of Nevada City Jewish Cemetery

Details
- Established: 1854
- Closed: 1890
- Location: Nevada City, Nevada County, California
- Country: United States
- Coordinates: 39.25456°N 121.02333°W
- Type: Jewish
- No. of graves: 29
- Find a Grave: Nevada City Jewish Cemetery

Nevada City Jewish Cemetery is a no longer active Jewish cemetery founded in 1854 by the Nevada Hebrew Society, and located in Nevada City, Nevada County, California. The last burial was during the summer of 1890. There are only 29 headstones that are visible. On October 29, 1972, the site was dedicated as a historical site.

It is privately operated by the Commission for the Preservation of Pioneer Jewish Cemeteries and Landmarks in the West and is not open to the public.

== History ==
The Nevada City Jewish Cemetery was founded in 1854 by the Nevada Hebrew Society. The first burial was Caroline Himes who died on July 19, 1856. The last burial happened in the summer of 1890, with the death of Louis W. Dreyfuss on July 22, 1890.

In 1962, the Commission for the Preservation of Pioneer Jewish Cemeteries and Landmarks in the West was formed to help with education, and restoration for all of the Jewish cemeteries in Gold Country. In 1964, the cemetery was restored after many months of work by the Commission for the Restoration of Pioneer Jewish Cemeteries; led by Mel Altman of Sacramento, and Rabbi Nathaniel Simkind of Richmond.

On October 29, 1972, the site was rededicated as a historical site. Congregation B’naim Harim of Grass Valley oversees the weekly upkeep of the cemetery.

== Related cemeteries ==
Other 19th-century Jewish cemeteries in Northern California are located at:

- Jackson Pioneer Jewish Cemetery (or Givoth Olam), Jackson, Amador County
- Grass Valley Pioneer Jewish Cemetery (or Shaar Zedek), Grass Valley, Nevada County
- Sonora Hebrew Cemetery, Sonora, Tuolumne County
- Placerville Pioneer Jewish Cemetery, Placerville, El Dorado County
- Marysville Hebrew Cemetery, Marysville, Yuba County
- Mokelumne Hill Pioneer Jewish Cemetery, Mokelumne Hill, Calaveras County
- Jewish Cemetery, Shasta, Shasta County

== See also ==
- Birth of a Community: Jews and the Gold Rush (1994 film)
- Hebrew Cemetery
- List of cemeteries in California
- Judah L. Magnes Museum
