= Centerville Pioneer Cemetery =

State cemetery in Fremont, California, United States

Coordinates: 37°33′35″N 122°00′30″W

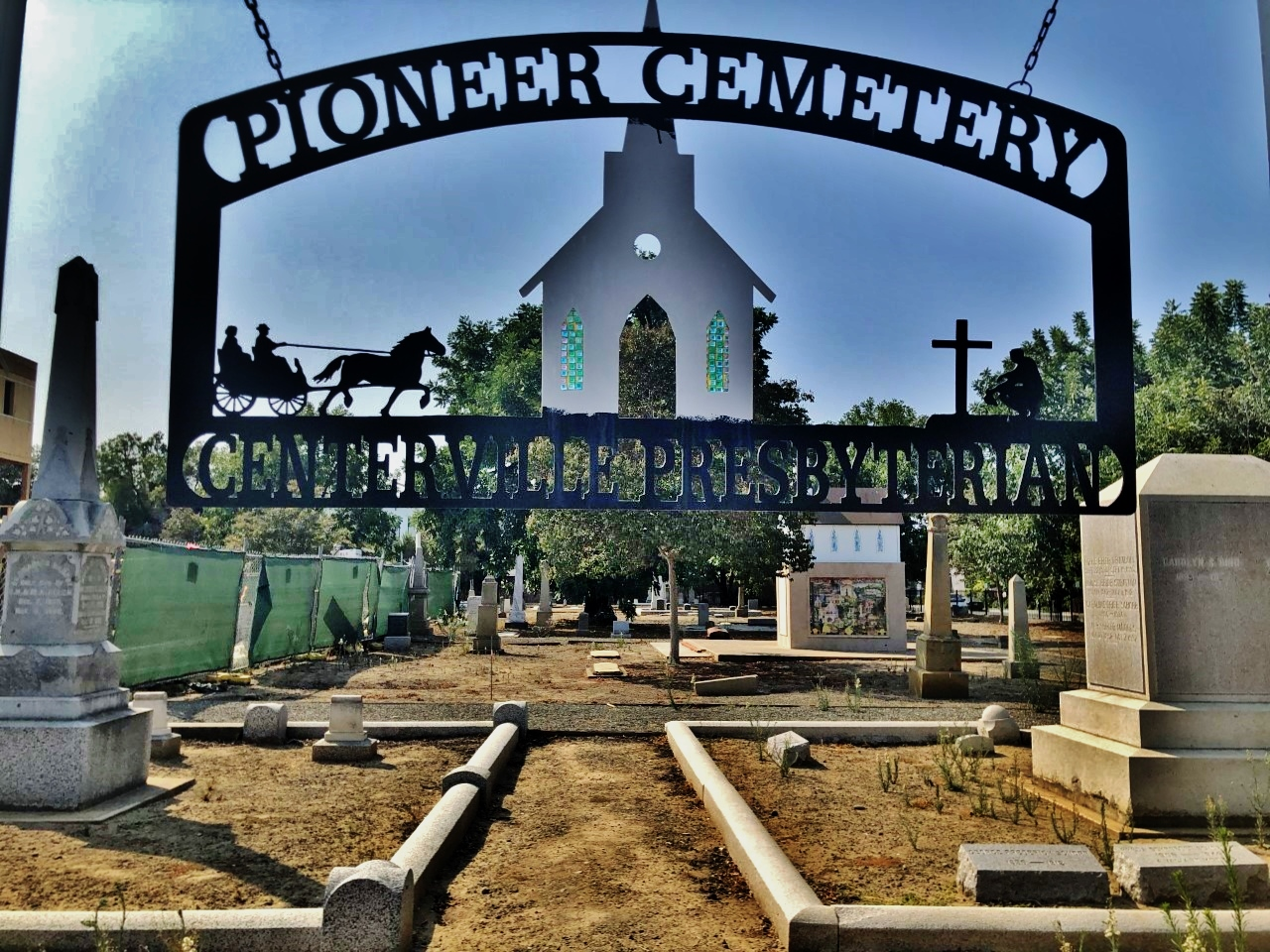
Centerville Presbyterian Pioneer Cemetery, in Fremont, California

The Centerville Pioneer Cemetery, also known as the Centerville Presbyterian Cemetery or Alameda Presbyterian Cemetery, is located at the corner of Post Street and Bonde Way in Fremont, California. It was officially designated as a state cemetery in 1858 or 1859, depending upon the source, and was listed in the California Register of Historic Resources in 1976.

== History ==
At the time the cemetery was established, the location of the cemetery was known as Washington Township, Alameda County, California, which was then made up of the villages of Mission San Jose, Irvington, Warm Springs, Centerville, Niles, Newark, Alvarado and Decoto. In time all eight villages became towns of the same names, and both the church and cemetery were renamed to reflect their location in the town of Centerville.

A century later in 1956, the five towns of Centerville, Niles, Irvington, Mission San Jose, and Warm Springs came together to form the incorporated City of Fremont, which is the current designation of the location of the Cemetery.

The first burials occurred sometime after 1855 when the Alameda Presbyterian Church, first organized in 1853, acquired the property in the summer of 1855 under the direction of the Rev. William Wallace Brier and nine other founding members.

== Notable graves ==
Several of Fremont’s notable founding pioneers are buried in the cemetery, many of whom have streets named after them. Among these are the Decoto family; Captain Caleb Cook Scott, a native of Nova Scotia, who sailed his way around the Horn of Magellan in South America in order to eventually settle in what later became Centerville; and Herman Eggers and sheep-raiser Robert Blacow, who were the early settlers with large farms in the current Glenmoor area of Fremont. Near the front of the cemetery lie the Brier family, including the Rev. William Wallace Brier, the Presbyterian minister who founded the cemetery and was Alameda County's first superintendent of schools. He also founded more than 27 churches, many of them in the Bay Area, including Centerville Presbyterian in Fremont, which manages the cemetery. Records indicate that a total of 368 persons are buried in this historic cemetery.

== Gallery ==
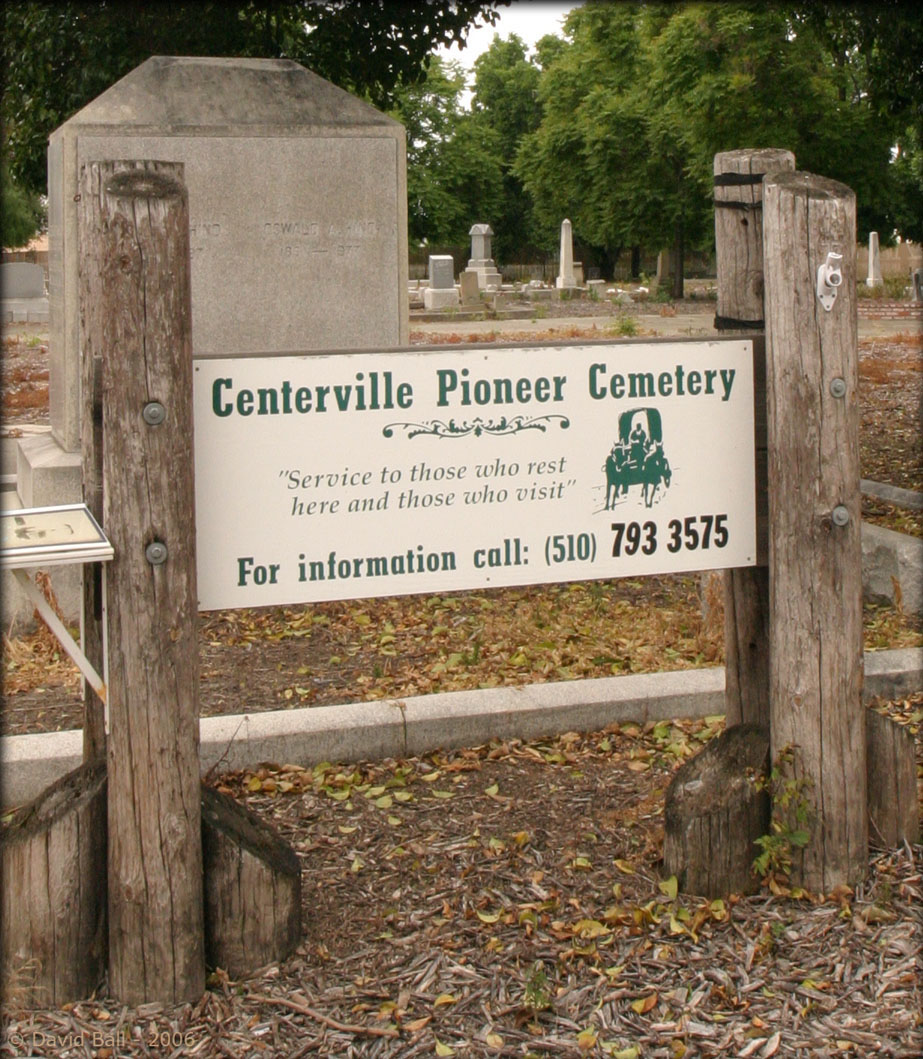
Centerville Pioneer Cemetery

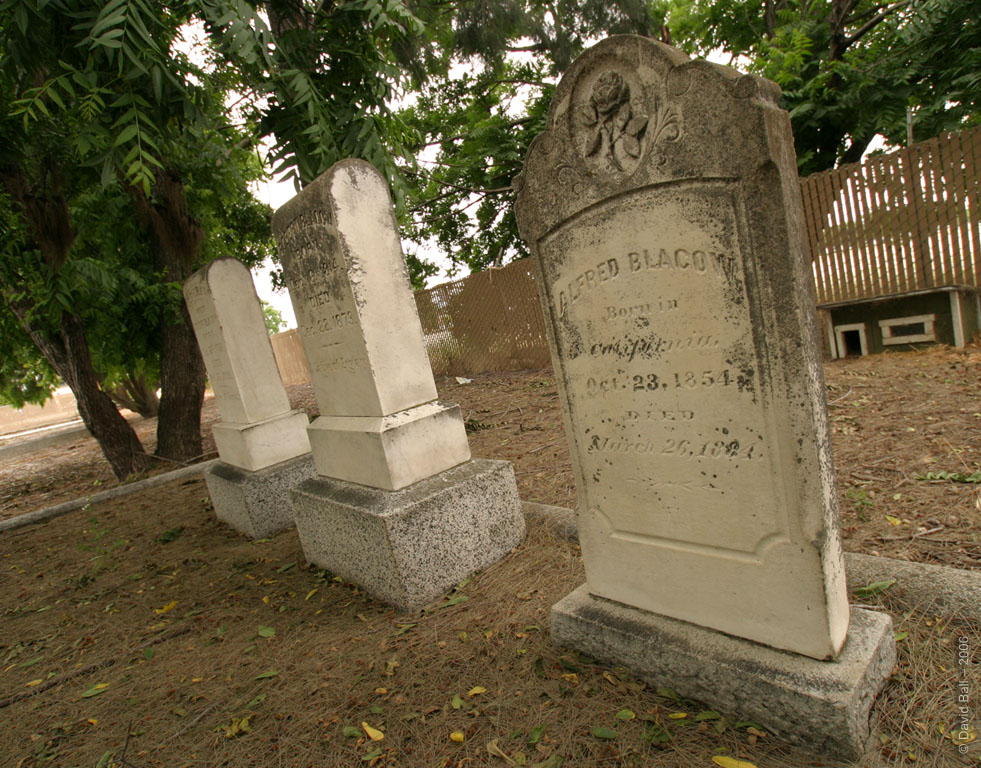
Blacow family plot

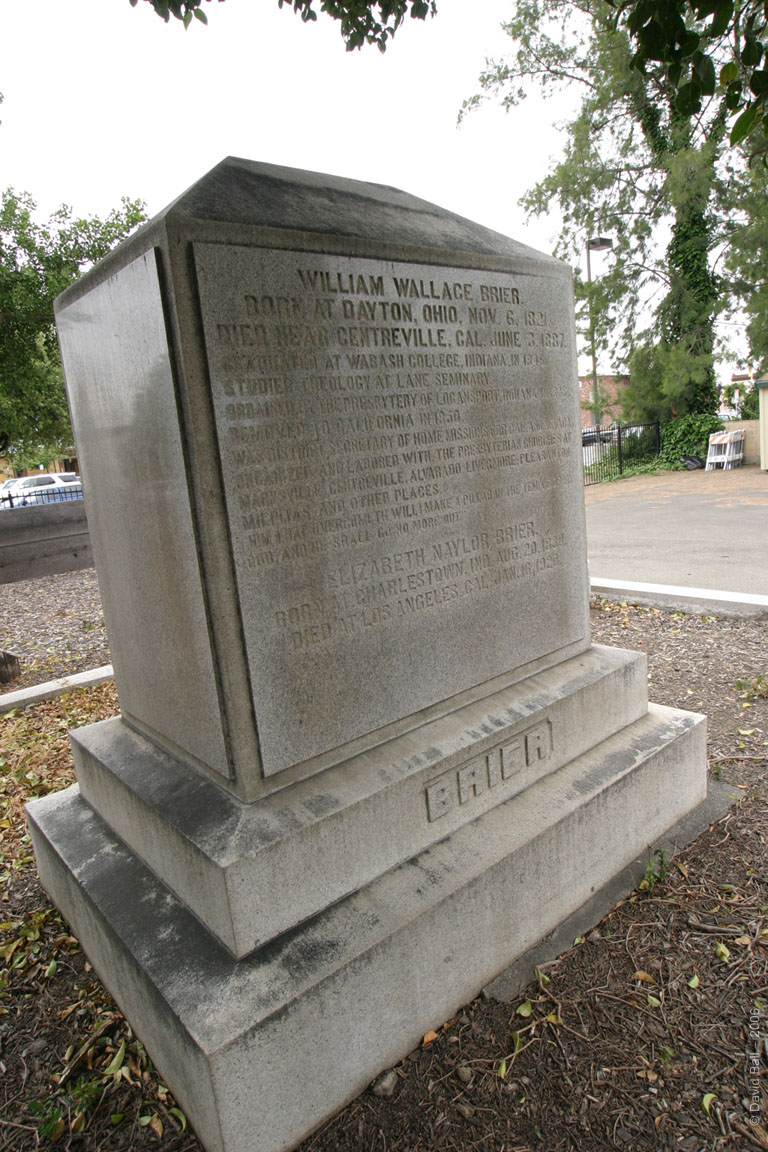
Brier tombstone memorial

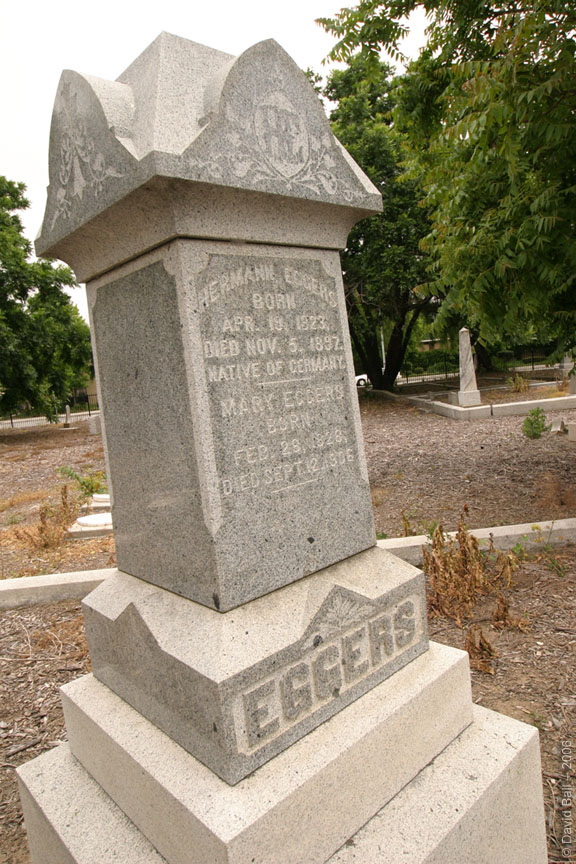
Herman Eggers family memorial

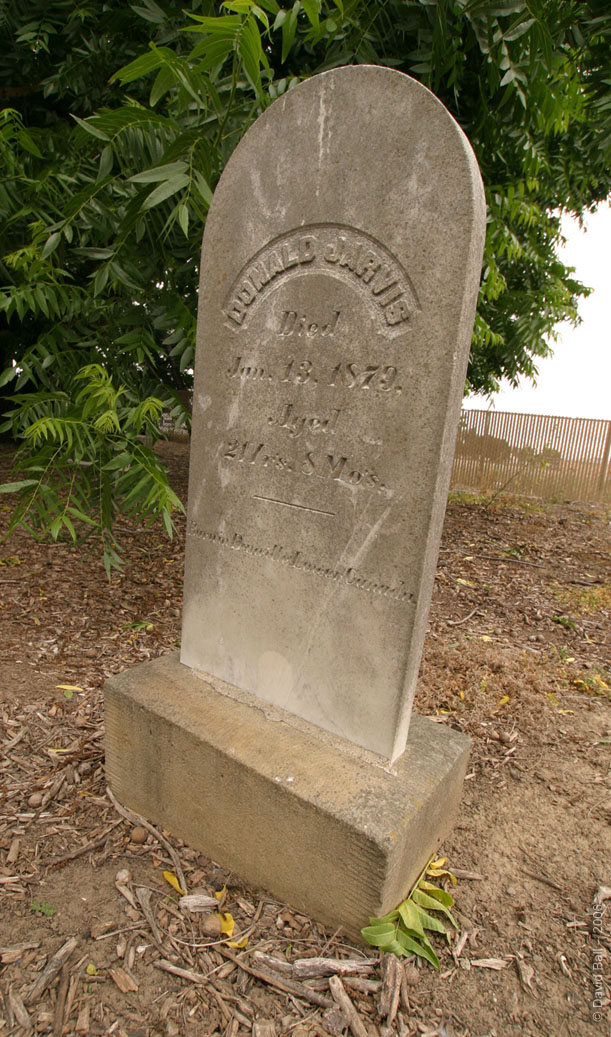
Donald Jarvis headstone

== See also ==
- Pioneer cemetery
