= Congregation B'nai Israel (Sacramento, California) =

Reform Jewish synagogue in Sacramento, California, US

- Hebrew: בני ישראל
- Location in California

Religion
- Affiliation: Reform Judaism
- Ecclesiastical or organisational status: Synagogue
- Leadership: Rabbi Mona Alfi
- Status: Active

Location
- Location: 3600 Riverside Boulevard, Sacramento, California
- Country: United States
- Coordinates: 38°32′49″N 121°30′30″W

Architecture
- Type: Synagogue architecture
- Established: 1852 (as a congregation)
- Completed: 1852 (7th and L Streets #1); 1858 (7th and L Streets #2); 1865 (6th Street); 1904 (Fifteenth Street #1); 1912 (Fifteenth Street #2); 1954 (Riverside Boulevard)

Website
- cbisacramento.org

Congregation B'nai Israel (Hebrew: בני ישראל) is a Reform Jewish congregation and synagogue, located at 3600 Riverside Boulevard, in Sacramento, California, in the United States. Founded in 1852 as an Orthodox community, the congregation is the oldest Jewish congregation in Sacramento. The congregation dates the California Gold Rush of 1849, when Jewish settlers gathered to observe the High Holy days. The congregation purchased its first building at 7th and L streets on September 2, 1852, making it the first synagogue west of the Mississippi River.

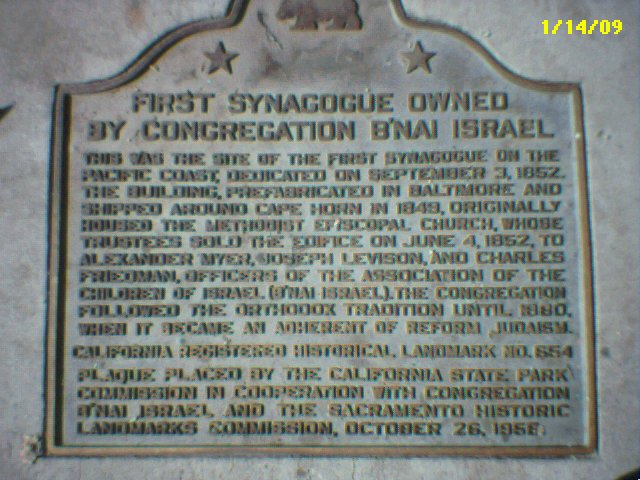
Plaque of Congregation B'nai Israel located at 7th and Capitol Light Rail Station, Sacramento.

== History ==
The congregation has survived the destruction caused by fires and floods throughout its history. In November 1852, fire destroyed its original location at 7th and L streets, and it met in congregants' homes until 1858. A Methodist congregation had constructed a building on their former lot during this time, and in 1858 B'nai Israel purchased this new building. Three years later, it too was destroyed by fire. In 1864, the congregation purchased a former Presbyterian concert hall on 6th Street for use as their synagogue.

In 1904, the congregation moved to 1421 Fifteenth Street, which also caught fire in 1912, and reopened after a year of renovations. This location was home to B'nai Israel until 1954, when the congregation moved to its current location at 3600 Riverside Boulevard. Through the next few decades, the campus expanded to include the Harry M. Tonkin Memorial Chapel, the Sosnick Library, and the Buddy Kandel education wing.

Congregation B'nai Israel owned the first Jewish cemetery in California, the Chevra Kaddisha Cemetery, Sacramento (active from 1850 until c. 1924). They were also active with the formation of the Home of Peace Cemetery in 1924, a successor to Chevra Kaddisha.

=== Roots of other synagogues ===
Between 1858 and 1861, a splinter group, calling itself B'nai Ha'Shalom had formed due to differences of opinion. The groups reunited in 1861 following floods that damaged the Bet Shalom cemetery. In 1879, the congregation turned from Orthodoxy to Reform, affiliating with the Union of American Hebrew Congregations in 1885. The more Orthodox members left to form Sacramento's Mosaic Law Synagogue. In 1970, members left the congregation to form Temple Beth Shalom in protest to the firing of the congregation's cantor.

=== 1999 arson attack ===
On June 18, 1999, B'nai Israel was one of three Sacramento synagogues (also including Temple Beth Shalom and Knesset Israel Torah Center) that were set ablaze by white supremacist brothers Matthew and Tyler Williams. The attacks caused damage of more than $1 million, with B'nai Israel alone sustaining over $800,000 in damage to its sanctuary and its library, which was destroyed.

Undeterred, the congregation met at the Sacramento community center that same evening for Shabbat services, and days later held a rally that drew over 5,000 people from the larger community. The arsonists subsequently murdered a gay couple, Gary Matson and Winfield Mowder, in Redding, California. The attack was the second time that the congregation had been the target of a hate crime: the synagogue was firebombed by a 17-year-old white supremacist in 1993.

== Rabbinical leaders ==
The following individuals have served as rabbi of Congregation B'nai Israel:

Ordinal	Officeholder	Term start	Term end	Time in office	Notes
1	J. Leonard Levy	1889	1893	3–4 years	
2	Abram Simon	1894	1899	4–5 years	
3					
??	Lester Frazini	1974	1995	20–21 years	
??	Brad Bloom	1995	2006	11–12 years	
??	Shoshanah King-Tornberg				
??	Mona Alfi		incumbent		

== See also ==
- Oldest synagogues in the United States
- California Historical Landmarks in Sacramento County

== Official website ==
- Official website
