= Home of Peace Cemetery (Sacramento, California) =

Jewish cemetery in Sacramento, California

Home of Peace

Details
- Established: 1924
- Location: 6200 Stockton Boulevard, Sacramento, California
- Country: United States
- Coordinates: 38.51376°N 121.43828°W
- Type: Jewish
- Size: 10 acres (4.0 ha)
- No. of graves: approx. 2700
- Website: www.homeofpeacecemetery.com
- Find a Grave: Home of Peace

The Home of Peace Cemetery is a Jewish cemetery founded in 1924, and located at 6200 Stockton Boulevard in Sacramento, California. This cemetery contains some of the earliest Jewish gravestones in the western United States, moved from Chevra Kaddisha Cemetery.

== History ==
The Home of Peace Cemetery land was purchased by Congregation B'nai Israel of Sacramento and donated to the Sacramento Benevolent Hebrew Society. The cemetery is a wedge shaped parcel and approximately 10-acres in size. Many of the graves from the precursor Chevra Kaddisha Cemetery (established in 1850), and were moved to Home of Peace Cemetery around the time of its opening in 1924. In a public ceremony in November 1925, Congregation B'nai Israel of Sacramento and Mosaic Law Congregation worked together to consecrate the land.

== See also ==
- List of cemeteries in California
- Sonora Hebrew Cemetery, first Jewish cemetery in the Gold Rush area
