= Placerville Pioneer Jewish Cemetery =

Defunct cemetery in El Dorado County, California

Details
- Established: 1854
- Closed: 1968
- Location: Placerville, El Dorado County, California
- Country: United States
- Coordinates: 38.72995°N 120.80920°W
- Type: Jewish
- Owned by: Placerville Hebrew Benevolent Society, Commission for the Preservation of Pioneer Jewish Cemeteries and Landmarks in the West
- No. of graves: 22–26
- Find a Grave: Placerville Pioneer Jewish Cemetery

Placerville Pioneer Jewish Cemetery is a no longer active Jewish cemetery founded in 1854 by the Placerville Hebrew Benevolent Society, and is located in Placerville, California. The last burial happened in 1968. It is a private site operated by the Commission for the Preservation of Pioneer Jewish Cemeteries and Landmarks in the West and is not open to the public.

== Related cemeteries ==
Other 19th-century Jewish cemeteries in Northern California are located at:

- Nevada City Jewish Cemetery, Nevada City, Nevada County;
- Jackson Pioneer Jewish Cemetery, Jackson, Almador County;
- Sonora Hebrew Cemetery, Sonora, Tuolumne County;
- Grass Valley Pioneer Jewish Cemetery (or Shaar Zedek), Grass Valley, Nevada County;
- Marysville Hebrew Cemetery, Marysville, Yuba County;
- Mokelumne Hill Pioneer Jewish Cemetery, Mokelumne Hill, Calaveras County;
- Jewish Cemetery, Shasta, Shasta County

== See also ==
- Birth of a Community: Jews and the Gold Rush (1994 film)
- Hebrew Cemetery
- List of cemeteries in California
- Judah L. Magnes Museum
