= Evans Center, New York =

Hamlet in New York, United States

Coordinates: 42°39′29″N 79°02′05″W

Evans Center is a hamlet in the town of Evans in Erie County, New York, United States. The Pioneer Cemetery was added to the National Register of Historic Places in 2012.
