= Ahavas Israel Cemetery =

Cemetery in Grand Rapids, Michigan, US

- Interactive map of Ahavas Israel Cemetery

Details
- Established: 1916
- Location: Grand Rapids, Michigan
- Country: United States
- Coordinates: 42°59′47″N 85°41′58″W
- Type: Jewish
- Owned by: Congregation Ahavas Israel
- Find a Grave: Ahavas Israel Cemetery

Ahavas Israel Cemetery is located at 1801 Garfield Avenue in Grand Rapids, Michigan. It is the cemetery for the Conservative Ahavas Israel congregation.

The Ahavas Achim Cemetery was created in 1916 by members of the Ahavas Achim and the Workmen's Circle. The Ahavas Achim was a conservative community founded by Orthodox members that had split from Grand Rapid's Temple Beth Israel in 1908. The Workmen's Circle was a service organisation for Jewish men. Temple Beth Israel and Ahavas Achim eventually merged in 1947, having begun discussions on a merger in 1937 prompted by the financial pressures of maintaining two Orthodox congregations in the midst of the Great Depression in the United States. The cemetery was renamed the Ahavas Israel Cemetery in 1962.
