= Grass Valley Pioneer Jewish Cemetery =

Cemetery in Nevada County, California

- Interactive map of Grass Valley Pioneer Jewish Cemetery

Details
- Established: 1856
- Closed: 1891
- Location: Second Street, Grass Valley, Nevada County, California
- Country: United States
- Coordinates: 39.22149°N 121.05685°W
- Type: Jewish
- Owned by: Hebrew Benevolent Society of Grass Valley, Commission for the Preservation of Pioneer Jewish Cemeteries and Landmarks in the West
- No. of graves: 22–30
- Find a Grave: Grass Valley Pioneer Jewish Cemetery

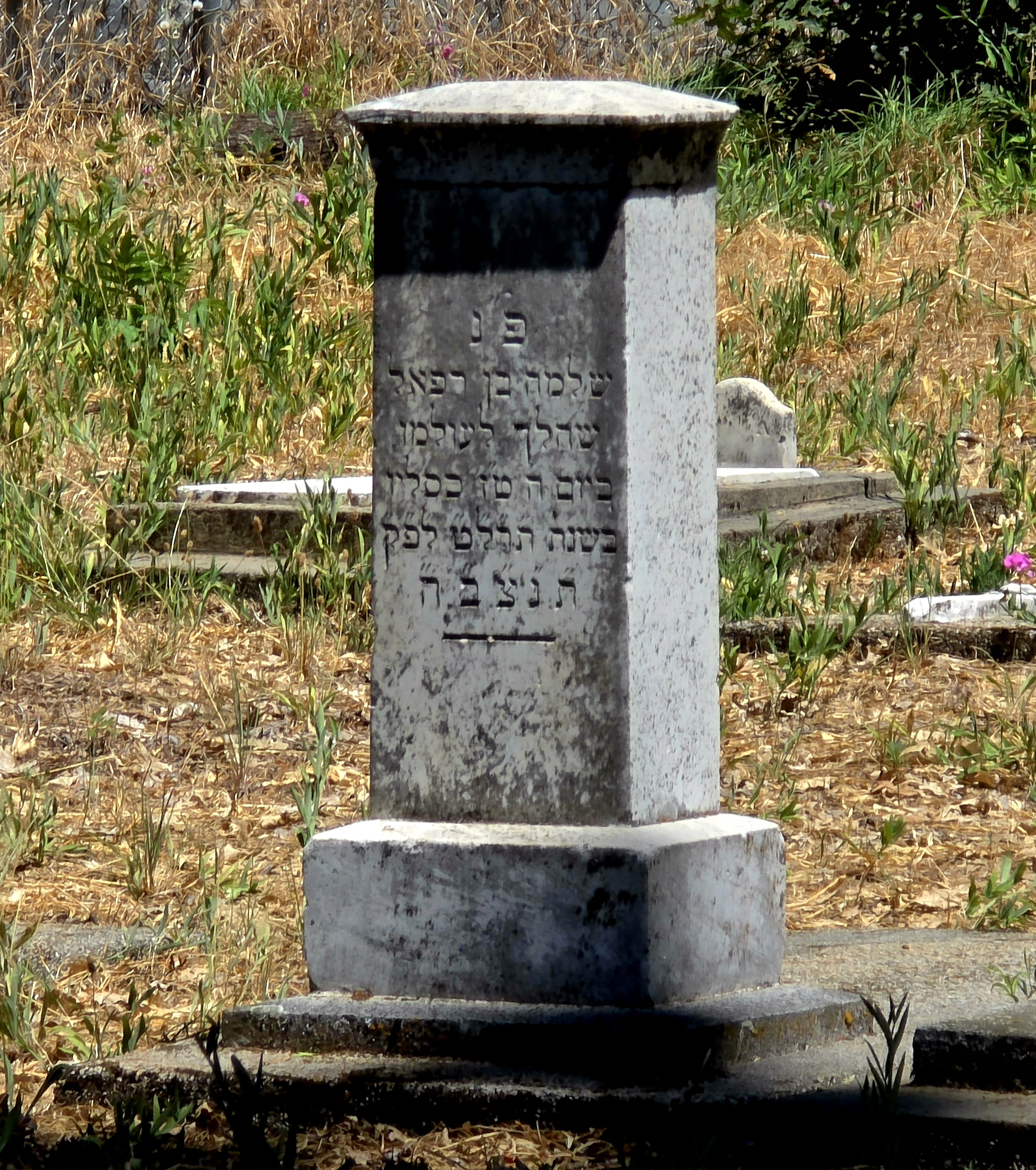
Monument in Hebrew at the Grass Valley Pioneer Jewish Cemetery

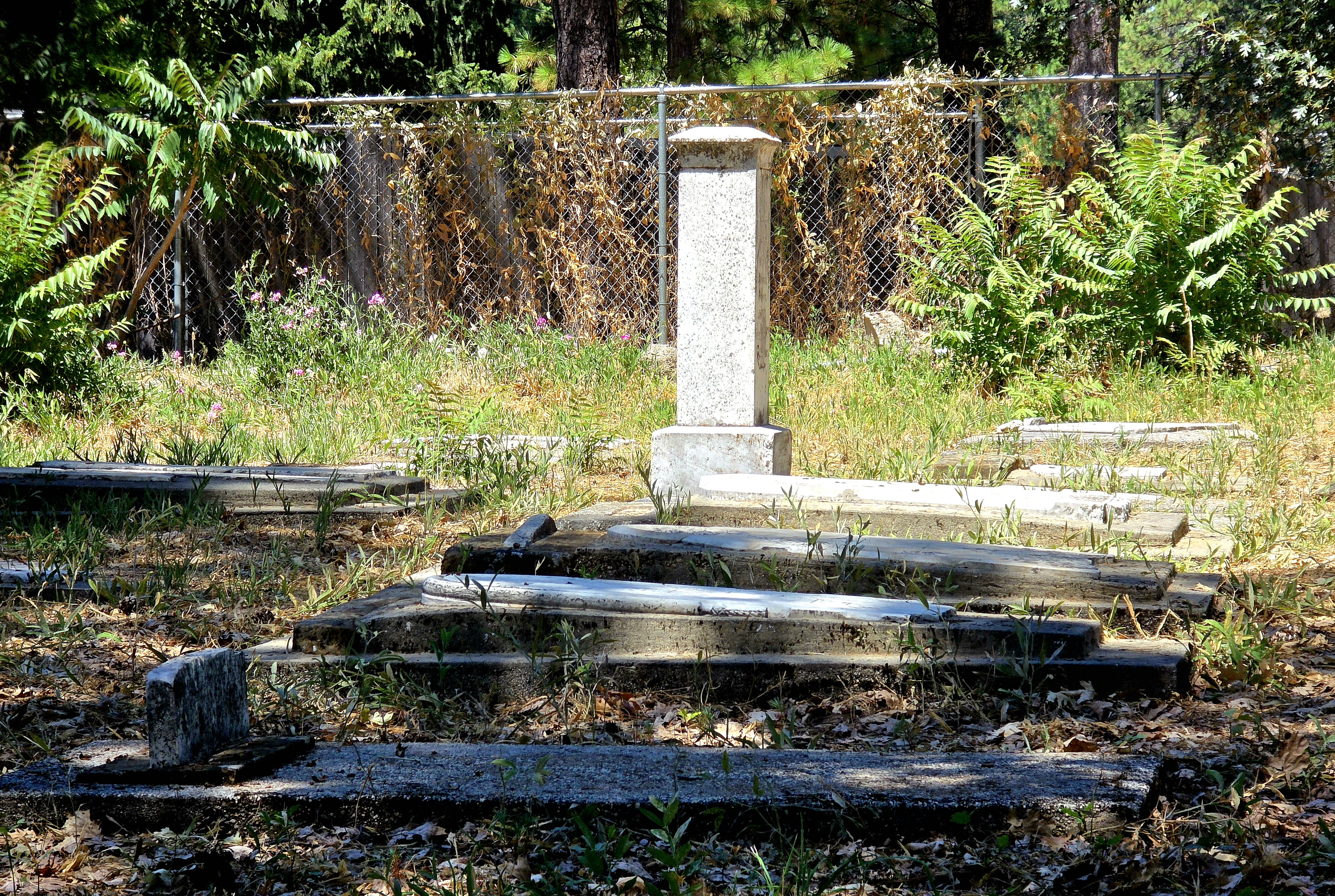
Graves at the Grass Valley Pioneer Jewish Cemetery

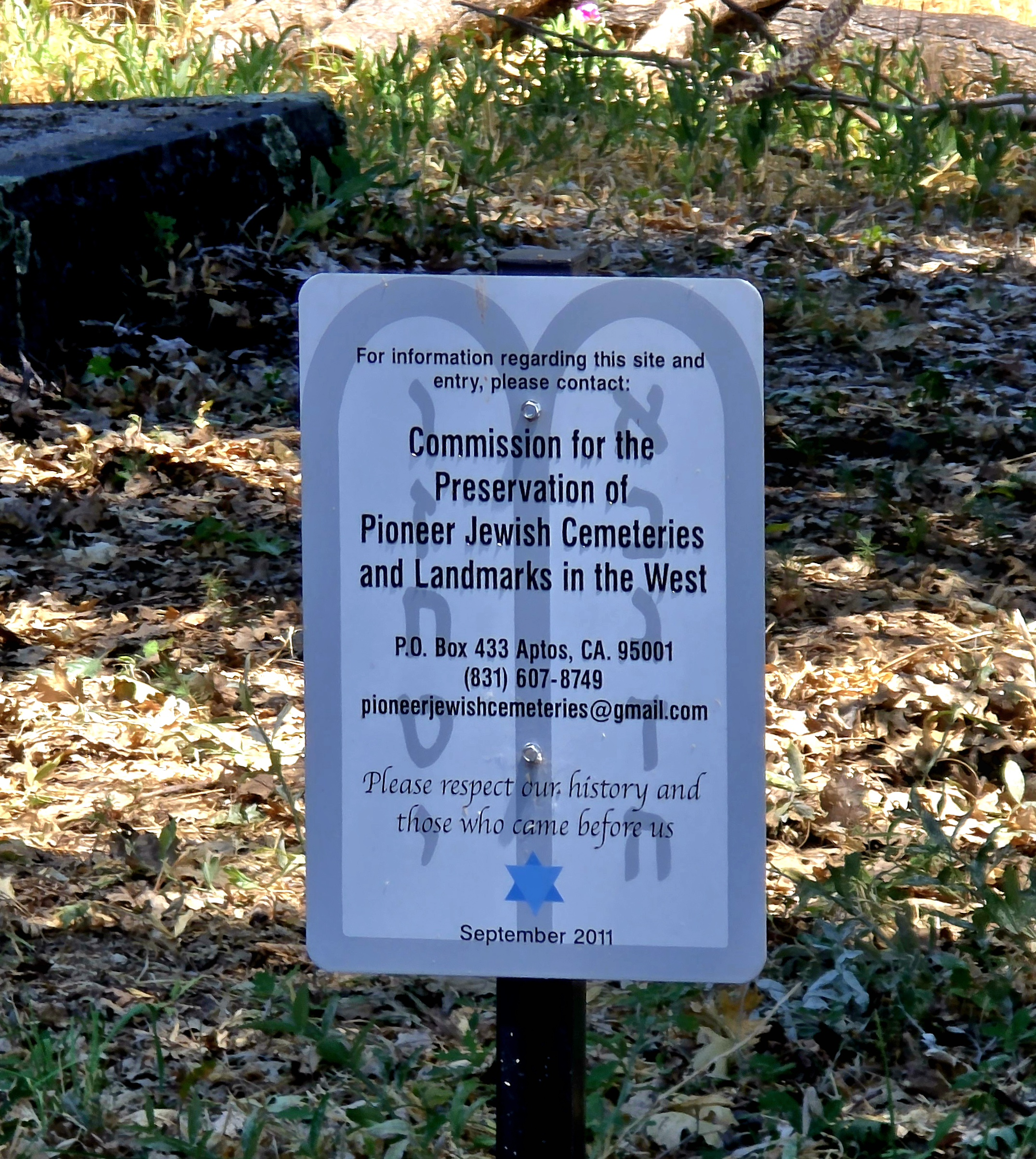
Sign at the Grass Valley Pioneer Jewish Cemetery

Grass Valley Pioneer Jewish Cemetery, also known as Shaar Zedek (English: Gate of Righteousness) is a no longer active Jewish pioneer cemetery founded in 1856 by the Hebrew Benevolent of Society of Grass Valley, and is located in Grass Valley, California, U.S. The last burial happened in 1891. It is a private site operated by the Commission for the Preservation of Pioneer Jewish Cemeteries and Landmarks in the West and is not open to the public.

== Related cemeteries ==
Other 19th-century Jewish cemeteries in Northern California are located at:

- Nevada City Jewish Cemetery, Nevada City, Nevada County;
- Jackson Pioneer Jewish Cemetery, Jackson, Almador County;
- Sonora Hebrew Cemetery, Sonora, Tuolumne County;
- Placerville Pioneer Jewish Cemetery, Placerville, El Dorado County;
- Marysville Hebrew Cemetery, Marysville, Yuba County;
- Mokelumne Hill Pioneer Jewish Cemetery, Mokelumne Hill, Calaveras County;
- Jewish Cemetery, Shasta, Shasta County

== See also ==
- Birth of a Community: Jews and the Gold Rush (1994 film)
- List of cemeteries in California
- Judah L. Magnes Museum
