= Pioneer Cemetery (Evans, New York) =

Historic cemetery in Erie County, New York, US

- U.S. National Register of Historic Places
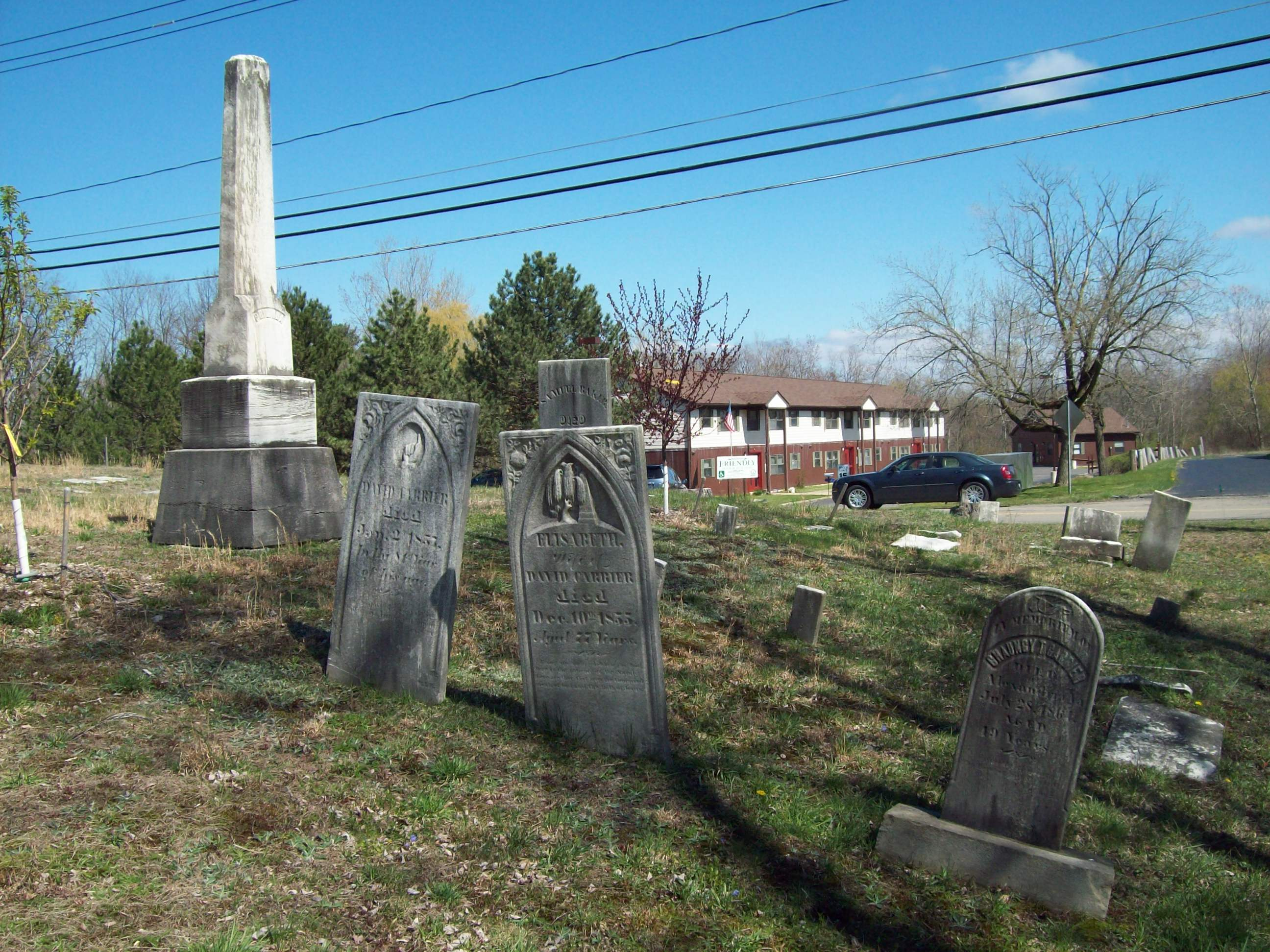
- Pioneer Cemetery, April 2012

- Location within New York Location within the United States
- Location: West side of N. Main St. between Gold St. & Beach Rd., Evans Center, New York
- Coordinates: 42°39′11″N 79°02′07″W
- Area: less than one acre
- NRHP reference No.: 11000997
- Added to NRHP: January 4, 2011

Pioneer Cemetery, also known as Evans Center Cemetery, is a historic cemetery located at Evans Center, Erie County, New York, USA. It consists of 10 to 11 rows of burials, with the oldest dating to 1810. The majority of the burials date between 1810 and 1860, with the most recent burial in 1928. Most are marked with simple tablet headstones. It features hilly terrain with a prominent rise at the center of the cemetery.

The cemetery is a burial ground for many early settlement-era families. It also includes at least three veterans of the American Revolution, as well as a number of veterans from the American Civil War. Asa Ames, who was a mid-19th sculptor, is also another significant burial that took place in this cemetery.

It was added to the National Register of Historic Places in 2012.
