= Mt. Carmel Cemetery (Lincoln, Nebraska) =

Jewish cemetery in Lancaster County, Nebraska

Coordinates: 40°51′13″N 96°42′09″W

- Interactive map of Mt. Carmel Cemetery

Details
- Location: North 14th and Elba Streets, Lincoln, Nebraska
- Type: Jewish

The Mt. Carmel Cemetery is located near North 14th and Elba Streets in Lincoln, Nebraska. In 1886, Samuel and Rachel Polowsky bought property in Lincoln's Belmont section. They later sold it to the Chevra B'nai Jehuda Cemetery Association. The cemetery serves Lincoln's Orthodox and Conservative Jews.
