= Marysville Hebrew Cemetery =

Jewish cemetery in Yuba County, California

- Interactive map of Marysville Hebrew Cemetery

Details
- Established: 1855
- Abandoned: 1945
- Location: Marysville, Yuba County, California
- Country: United States
- Coordinates: 39.16153°N 121.58791°W
- Type: Jewish
- No. of graves: 50+
- Find a Grave: Marysville Hebrew Cemetery
- The Political Graveyard: Marysville Hebrew Cemetery

Marysville Hebrew Cemetery also known as Marysville Jewish Cemetery, and Jewish Cemetery of Marysville, is a no longer active Jewish cemetery founded in 1855 by the Marysville Hebrew Benevolent Society, and is located at the southeast corner of Marysville Cemetery, in Marysville, California. In 1945, the cemetery was abandoned and forgotten; by 1995 it was restored.

== History ==
As early as 1852, the Marysville Hebrew Benevolent Society was founded and their bylaws stated, "The funds of the society shall be appropriated as follows: relief to the poor, needy, sick, and the burial of the dead of the Hebrew persuasion in Marysville and vicinity." In 1855, the Marysville Hebrew Cemetery was founded by the Marysville Hebrew Benevolent Society. Many of the gravestones in this cemetery are in Hebrew and list the place of birth as either Prussia or Germany; with the exception being the graves of children born in California. In the early 1900s, the Marysville Hebrew Benevolent Society disbanded. By 1945, the cemetery had dug the final grave and it was abandoned.

In 1962, The Commission for the Preservation of Pioneer Jewish Cemeteries and Landmarks in the West was formed to help with education, and restoration for all of the Jewish cemeteries in Gold County. In 1995, The Commission for the Preservation of Pioneer Jewish Cemeteries and Landmarks in the West repaired this abandoned cemetery.

== Related cemeteries ==
Other 19th-century Jewish cemeteries in Northern California are located at:

- Jackson Pioneer Jewish Cemetery (or Givoth Olam), Jackson, Amador County;
- Grass Valley Pioneer Jewish Cemetery (or Shaar Zedek), Grass Valley, Nevada County;
- Sonora Hebrew Cemetery, Sonora, Tuolumne County;
- Placerville Pioneer Jewish Cemetery, Placerville, El Dorado County;
- Nevada City Jewish Cemetery, Nevada City, Nevada County;
- Mokelumne Hill Pioneer Jewish Cemetery, Mokelumne Hill, Calaveras County;
- Jewish Cemetery, Shasta, Shasta County

== See also ==
- Birth of a Community: Jews and the Gold Rush (1994 film)
- Hebrew Cemetery
- List of cemeteries in California
- Judah L. Magnes Museum
