= Chevra Kaddisha Cemetery, Sacramento =

Defunct Jewish cemetery in Sacramento, California (1850–c. 1924)

Chevra Kaddisha Cemetery
- Interactive map of Chevra Kaddisha Cemetery

Details
- Established: November 12, 1850
- Closed: c. 1924
- Location: 3230 J Street, Sacramento, California
- Country: United States
- Coordinates: 38.571742°N 121.463965°W
- Type: Jewish
- No. of graves: 500

California Historical Landmark
- Reference no.: 654-1

Chevra Kaddisha Cemetery (English: Holy Society), later known as Home of Peace Cemetery, was the first Jewish cemetery in California founded on November 12, 1850, by the Sacramento City Hebrew Association, and was once located at 33rd at K Streets (present-day 3230 J Street) in the East Sacramento neighborhood of Sacramento, California. The cemetery closed around 1924, and is no longer standing. It is the location of a strip mall, there is no historical plaque.

The site is listed as a California Historical Landmark (number 654-1), by the California Office of Historic Preservation since July 28, 1958.

== History ==
Moses Hyman, a merchant from New Orleans who settled in Sacramento in 1849, had donated to the Jewish Benevolent Society for the establishment of the cemetery. Hyman had made the journey from New Orleans to California with Samuel Harris Goldstein, a merchant who settled in Marysville and accidentally died on May 30, 1850, when he fell overboard on a boat. It is believed that Goldstein was the first person buried at the cemetery. The cemetery was owned by Congregation B'nai Israel of Sacramento. Some 500 burials occurred at this site. It was located across the street from the former New Helvetia Cemetery, the first cemetery in the city.

In 1924, part of the cemetery land was sold, and they started reinterring graves. The majority were moved to Home of Peace Jewish Cemetery (at 6200 Stockton Blvd.) in Sacramento, and some were moved to the Jewish cemeteries in Colma, California. The last portion of the cemetery land was sold in 1945.

== See also ==
- California Historical Landmarks in Sacramento County
- Chevra kadisha, a Jewish 19th-century burial association
- List of cemeteries in California
- Sacramento Historic City Cemetery
- Sonora Hebrew Cemetery, first Jewish cemetery in the Gold Rush area
