= Hebrew Cemetery =

Hebrew Cemetery may refer to:

- Hebrew Cemetery (Richmond, Virginia), listed on the National Register of Historic Places (NRHP) in Virginia
- Hebrew Cemetery (Jackson, Michigan), listed on the NRHP in Jackson County, Michigan
- Hebrew Cemetery (Cascade County, Montana), one of Cascade County's cemeteries
- Marysville Hebrew Cemetery, Marysville, Yuba County, California
- Sonora Hebrew Cemetery, Sonora, Tuolumne County, California

== See also ==
- Pioneer Jewish Cemetery (disambiguation)
