= Birth of a Community: Jews and the Gold Rush =

- Directed by: Bill Chayes
- Release date: 1994
- Running time: 40 minutes
- Country: United States
- Language: English

Birth of a Community: Jews and the Gold Rush is a 1994 documentary film directed by Bill Chayes. The film traces the history of Jews and the experiences that tempted this group and others to the American West Coast by the prospect of being financially established by mining gold.

== Synopsis ==
Groups of various national and ethnic origins arrived seeking their fortune; this documentary focuses on the Jewish presence in California during the Gold Rush. This feature traces the arrival of Jews in the "rough and tumble" West and follows how they settled and grew with the towns and establishing communities, which have grown to become more valuable than gold in a sense.

The city which most '49ers arrived at on their way to seek gold was San Francisco, due to an earlier find of gold at Sutter's Mill, in Northern California. By 1850 almost 100,000 miners had descended upon the area, which had been an insignificant remote outpost until then. The people traveled by horse-drawn covered wagons and steam and wind powered ships. Fleeing unstable governments, seeking religious freedom and fortune, some Jews journeyed all the way from Europe to the Pacific Coast.

The untamed West's way of life into which these Jews settled is accurately portrayed by historical photographs and diary excerpts from the time period. These documents of the past give viewers a glance into the unruly bars and casinos of yesteryear, in a time when lawlessness was rampant in a culture of few limitations.

Despite being surrounded by mass disorder, Jews in the community took the opportunity to prosper. Instead of discovering gold in mines, businessmen such as Levi Strauss were extremely successful through the sale of canvas trousers to prospectors headed to the gold fields.

However, for Jews determined to follow an observant way of life, the liberal climate of California's growing cities was frustrating. August Helbing founded the Eureka Benevolent Society so that Jews could occupy themselves in an appropriate manner during the evening hours. Before the creation of the society the only option for these Jews was to spend time in the rears of their places of business, as they did not frequent betting halls or theatrical plays.

Soon, signs of the Jewish religion were showing up all over the city of San Francisco. The first Jewish congregation established in the city of San Francisco celebrated Rosh Hashanah in 1849. Shortly afterwards a kosher butcher, local mohel service and a cemetery were established.

As the cities and towns of California developed even further, area Jews lived with the reality of the ominous presence of intolerance. Various minority ethnic and racial groups living in the state were barred from bearing witness in court, which served as an impediment to their legal rights. This and other injustices caused the Golden State to tackle matters of discrimination much sooner than other regions in the United States, and the state thus served as a refuge for numerous Jews.

From these widespread and uncertain Gold Rush beginnings, Northern California's unique Jewish community has continued to flourish. The legacy of these early Jewish '49ers is now part of the cultural fabric of the American West.

== See also ==
- Chevra Kaddisha Cemetery, Sacramento, the first Jewish cemetery in California
- Sonora Hebrew Cemetery, the first Gold Rush-region Jewish cemetery
