= Sonora Hebrew Cemetery =

Jewish cemetery in Tuolumne County, California

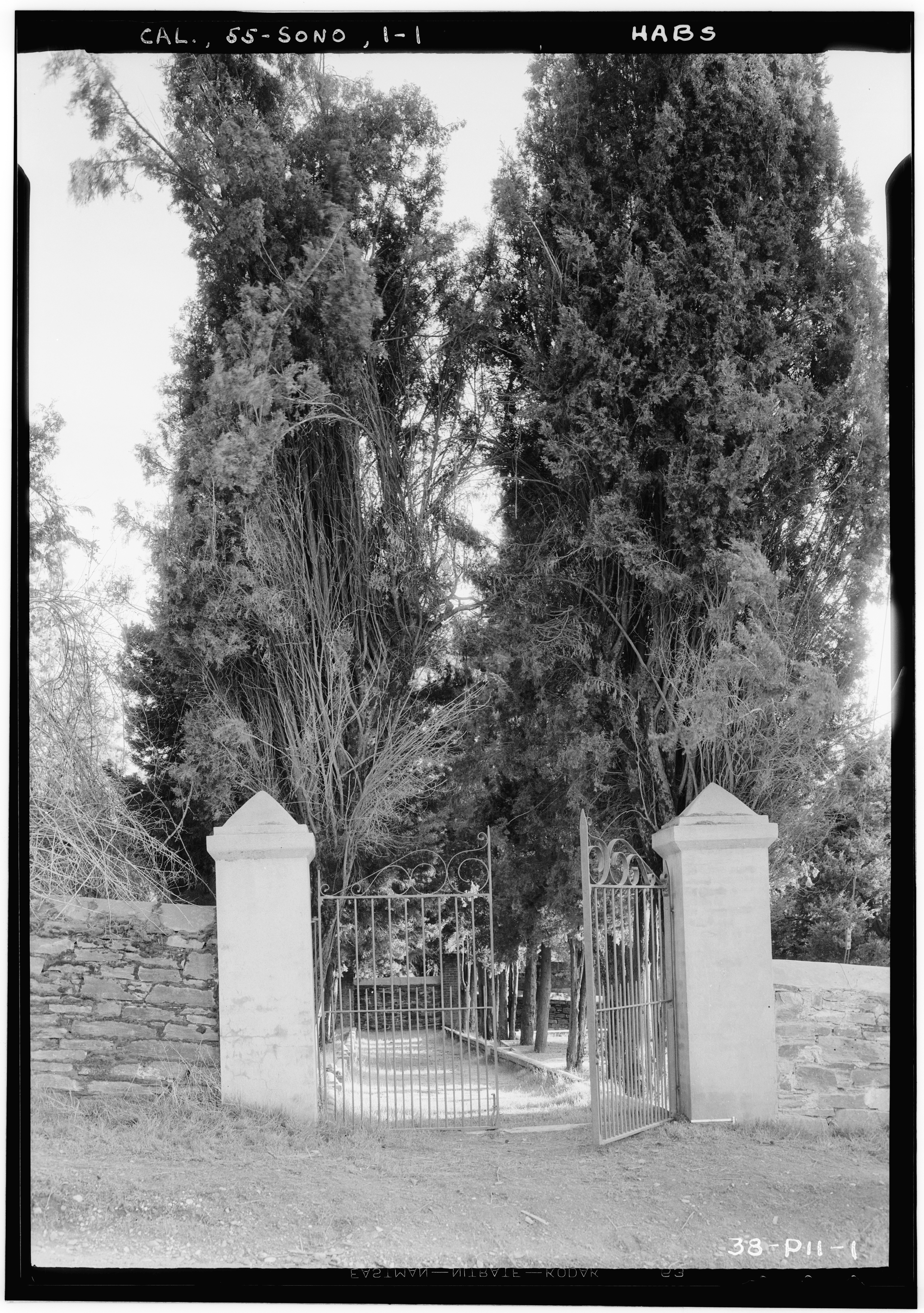
- Sonora Hebrew Cemetery entrance in 1934

Details
- Established: c. 1851
- Closed: 1977
- Location: Sonora, Tuolumne County, California
- Country: United States
- Coordinates: 37.98421°N 120.38651°W
- Type: Jewish
- No. of graves: 70
- Find a Grave: Sonora Hebrew Cemetery
- The Political Graveyard: Sonora Hebrew Cemetery

The Sonora Hebrew Cemetery, also known as Pioneer Jewish Cemetery, is an inactive Jewish cemetery founded in c. 1851, and located in Sonora, California. This was the first Jewish cemetery in the Gold Rush region.

== History ==
The cemetery was founded by the Hebrew Benevolent Society and is mostly the graves of European-born Jews who emigrated to the Gold Country. The first burial is recorded in 1853 as Hartwig Caro, age 17; however it's possible there were burials starting in 1851.

Local Jewish community leader Mayer Baer (1821–1907), and then his son Julius Baer (1876–1972) maintained the cemetery up until 1972.

As of 2022, there are only 44 visible grave sites. In 1962, the Commission for the Preservation of Pioneer Jewish Cemeteries and Landmarks in the West was formed to help with education, and restoration for all of the Jewish cemeteries in Gold County. The Mother Lode Jewish Community has an annual clean up day, when they visit the cemetery as a group and maintain the space.

== Related cemeteries ==
Other 19th-century Jewish cemeteries in Northern California are located at:

- Jackson Pioneer Jewish Cemetery (or Givoth Olam), Jackson, Amador County;
- Grass Valley Pioneer Jewish Cemetery (or Shaar Zedek), Grass Valley, Nevada County;
- Marysville Hebrew Cemetery, Marysville, Yuba County;
- Placerville Pioneer Jewish Cemetery, Placerville, El Dorado County;
- Nevada City Jewish Cemetery, Nevada City, Nevada County;
- Mokelumne Hill Pioneer Jewish Cemetery, Mokelumne Hill, Calaveras County;
- Jewish Cemetery, Shasta, Shasta County

== See also ==
- Birth of a Community: Jews and the Gold Rush (1994 film)
- Hebrew Cemetery
- List of cemeteries in California
- Judah L. Magnes Museum
- Chevra Kaddisha Cemetery, Sacramento, first Jewish cemetery in the state
