= List of cemeteries in Oregon =

This list of cemeteries in Oregon includes currently operating, historical (closed for new interments), and defunct (graves abandoned or removed) cemeteries, columbaria, and mausolea which are historical and/or notable. It does not include pet cemeteries.

== Baker County ==
- Alder Creek in Baker City
- Auburn Cemetery in Baker City
- Big Creek Cemetery in Baker City
- Dixie-Lime in Baker City
- Eagle valley Cemetery in Baker CityGoose Creek Cemetery in Baker City
- Love Cemetery in Baker City
- Mt. Hope Cemetery
- Rock Creek Cemetery in Baker City
- St. Francis DeSales in Baker City
- Wingville Cemetery in Baker City

== Benton County ==
- Corvallis Odd Fellows Pioneer Cemetery in Corvallis
- Crystal Lake Cemetery in Corvallis; NRHP-listed
- Herbert Pioneer in Corvallis
- Irwin Cemetery in Corvallis
- Locke Cemetery in Corvallis
- McBee Family Burial Ground in Corvallis
- Mt. Union Cemetery in Philomath
- Oak Lawn Memorial Park
- Oakridge Cemetery in Corvallis
- Powell Family Cemetery in Corvallis
- Robinson Family Burying Ground in Corvallis
- St. Mary's Catholic in Corvallis
- Winkle Cemetery in Corvallis

== Clackamas County ==
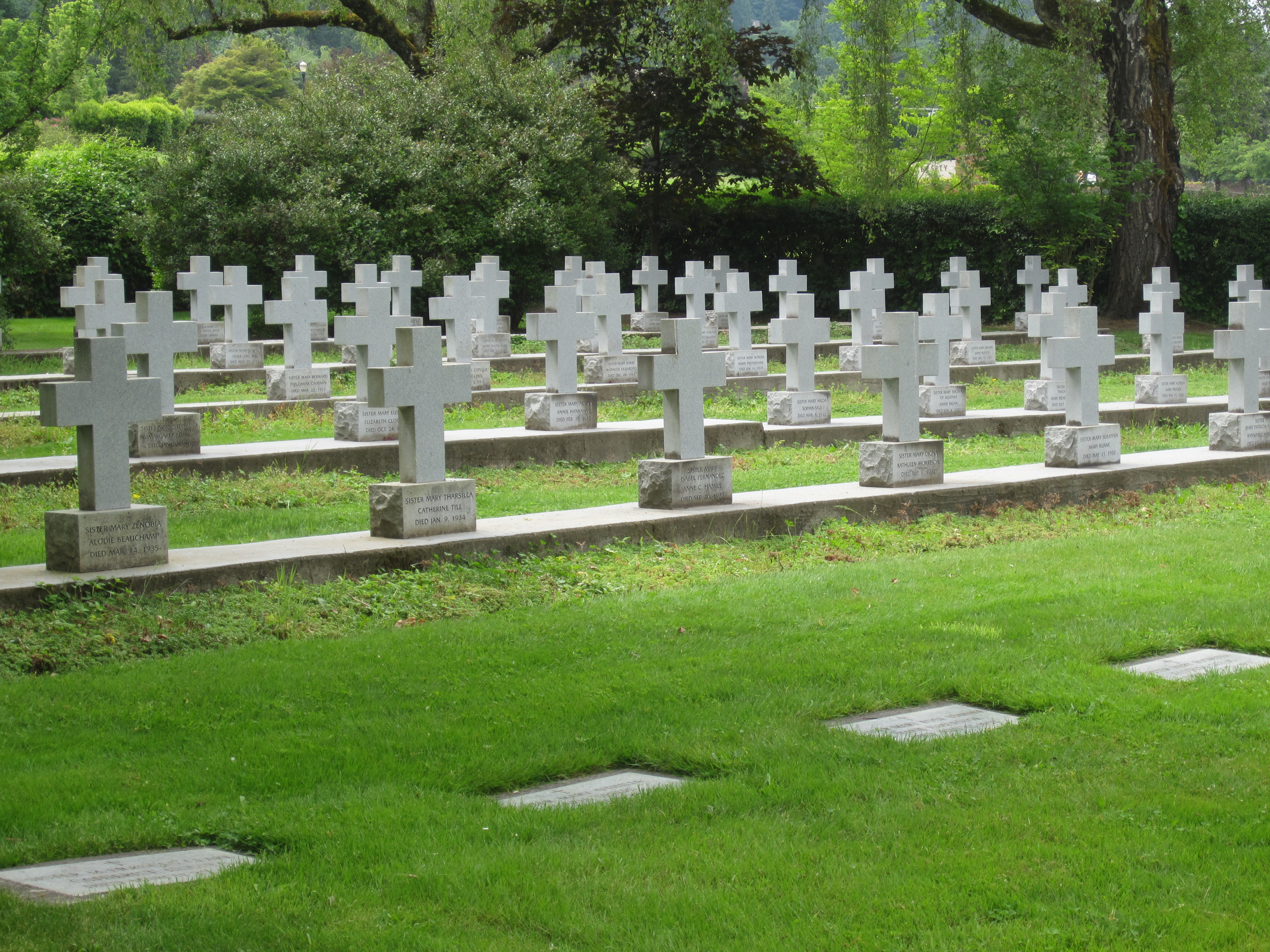
Sisters' Cemetery (2018) at Marylhurst University, Marylhurst, Clackamas County

- Milwaukie Pioneer Cemetery in Milwaukie
- Mountain View Cemetery in Oregon City
- Sisters' Cemetery adjacent to the Marylhurst University in Lake Oswego

== Clatsop County ==
- Astoria Pioneer Cemetery in Astoria
- Greenwood Cemetery in Astoria
- Knappa Prairie in Astoria
- Lewis and Clark Cemetery in Astoria

== Douglas County ==
- Roseburg National Cemetery in Roseburg

== Jackson County ==
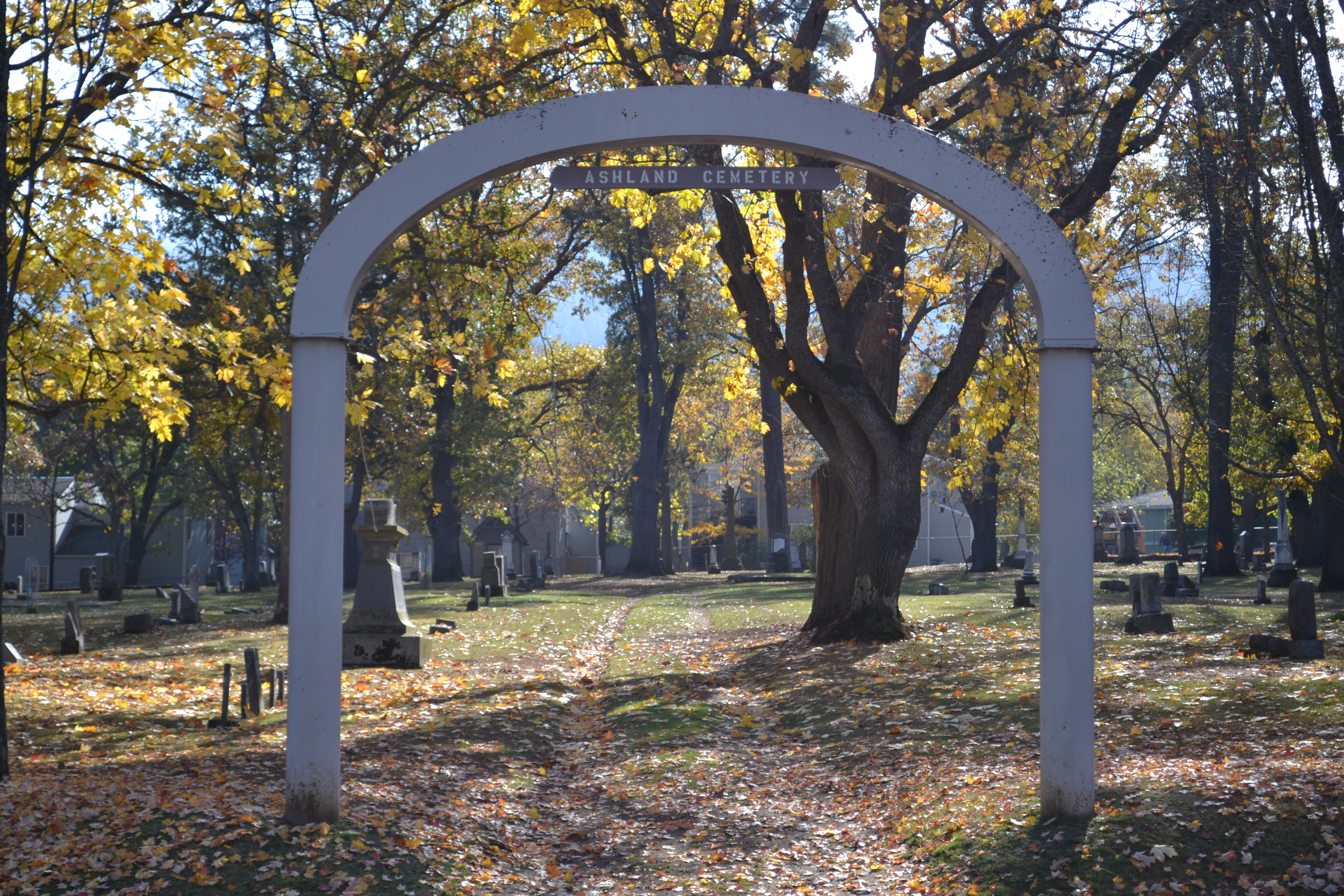
Ashland Cemetery in Ashland, Jackson County

- Ashland Cemetery in Ashland; NRHP-listed
- Eagle Point National Cemetery in Eagle Point; NRHP-listed
- Hargadine Cemetery in Ashland; NRHP-listed
- Medford IOOF Cemetery in Medford; NRHP-listed
- Mountain View Cemetery in Ashland; NRHP-listed

== Lane County ==
- Eugene Masonic Cemetery in Eugene; NRHP-listed
- Eugene Pioneer Cemetery in Eugene; NRHP-listed
- Luper Cemetery near Eugene
- Oak Hill Cemetery near Eugene
- Rest-Haven Memorial Park in Eugene

== Malheur County ==
- Evergreen Cemetery in Ontario
- Owyhee Pioneer Cemetery in Adrian

== Marion County ==
- City View Cemetery in Salem
- Lee Mission Cemetery in Salem; NRHP-listed
- Mt. Angel Pioneer Cemetery in Mt. Angel
- Salem Pioneer Cemetery in Salem; NRHP-listed
- St. Boniface Church Cemetery in Sublimity

== Multnomah County ==
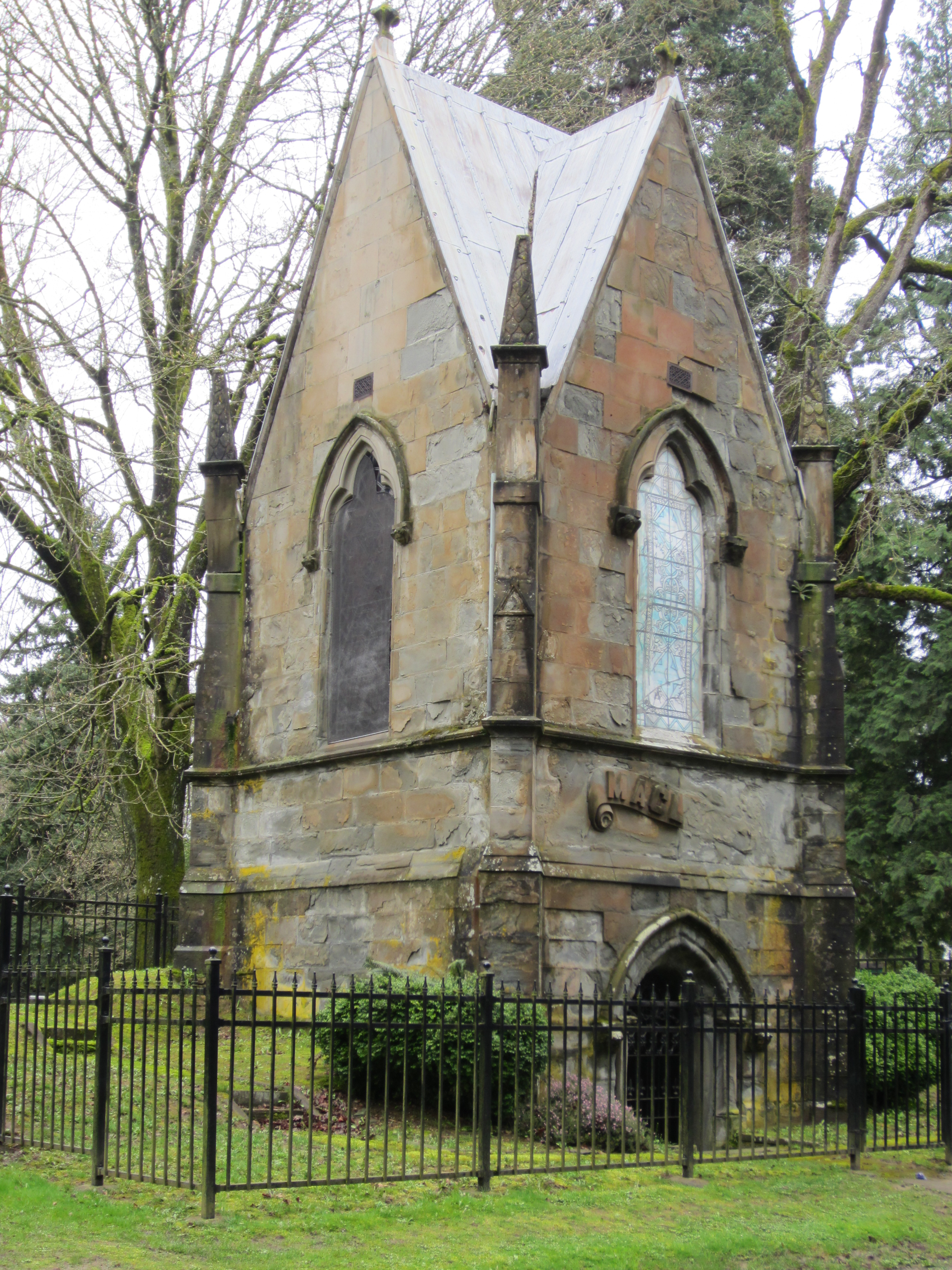
MacLeay Mausoleum at Lone Fir Cemetery, Portland, Multnomah County

- Ahavai Sholom
- Beth Israel Cemetery in Portland
- Brainard Cemetery in Portland
- Bridal Veil Cemetery
- Columbia Pioneer Cemetery in Portland
- Congregation Shaarie Torah Cemetery in Portland
- Douglass Cemetery in Troutdale
- Escobar Cemetery in Gresham
- Forest Lawn Cemetery in Gresham
- Grand Army of the Republic Cemetery in Portland
- Greenwood Hills Cemetery in Portland
- Gresham Pioneer Cemetery in Gresham
- Historic Columbian Cemetery in Portland
- Japanese Ancestral Society of Portland
- Jones Cemetery in Portland
- Lincoln Memorial Park in Portland
- Lone Fir Cemetery in Portland; NRHP-listed
- Moar Cemetery in Sauvie Island
- Mount Calvary Cemetery in Portland
- Mountain View Corbett Cemetery in Corbett
- Mountain View Stark Cemetery in Troutdale
- Multnomah Park Cemetery in Portland
- Pleasant Home Cemetery in Gresham
- Powell Grove Cemetery in Portland
- River View Cemetery in Portland
- Riverview Abbey Mausoleum in Portland
- Rose City Cemetery in Portland
- Saint Joseph Cemetery in Gresham
- White Birch Cemetery in Gresham
- Willamette National Cemetery in Portland; NRHP-listed

== Umatilla County ==
- Olney Cemetery
- Pendleton Pioneer Cemetery

== Wallowa County ==
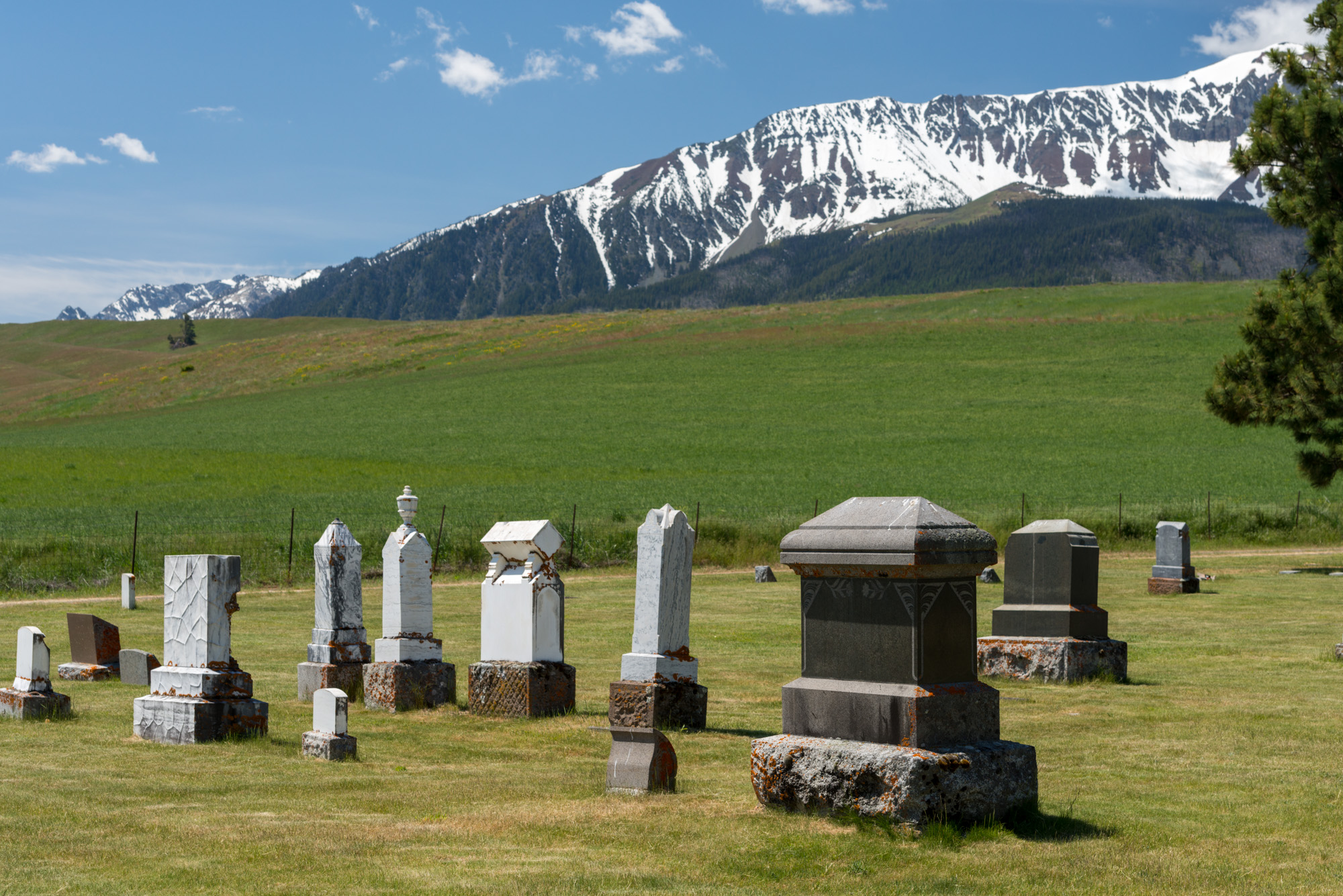
Joseph Cemetery, Wallowa County, Oregon

- Old Chief Joseph Gravesite near Joseph; NRHP-listed
- Joseph Cemetery (or Prairie Creek Cemetery), near Joseph

== Washington County ==
- Hillsboro Pioneer Cemetery in Hillsboro
- Winona Cemetery in Tualatin

== Wheeler County ==
- Fort Watson Cemetery in Dayville
- Fossil IOOF Cemetery No. 110 in Fossil
- Fossil Masonic Cemetery in Fossil
- Haystack Cemetery in Spray
- Mitchell IOOF Cemetery in Mitchell
- Spanish Gulch in Antone

== Yamhill County ==
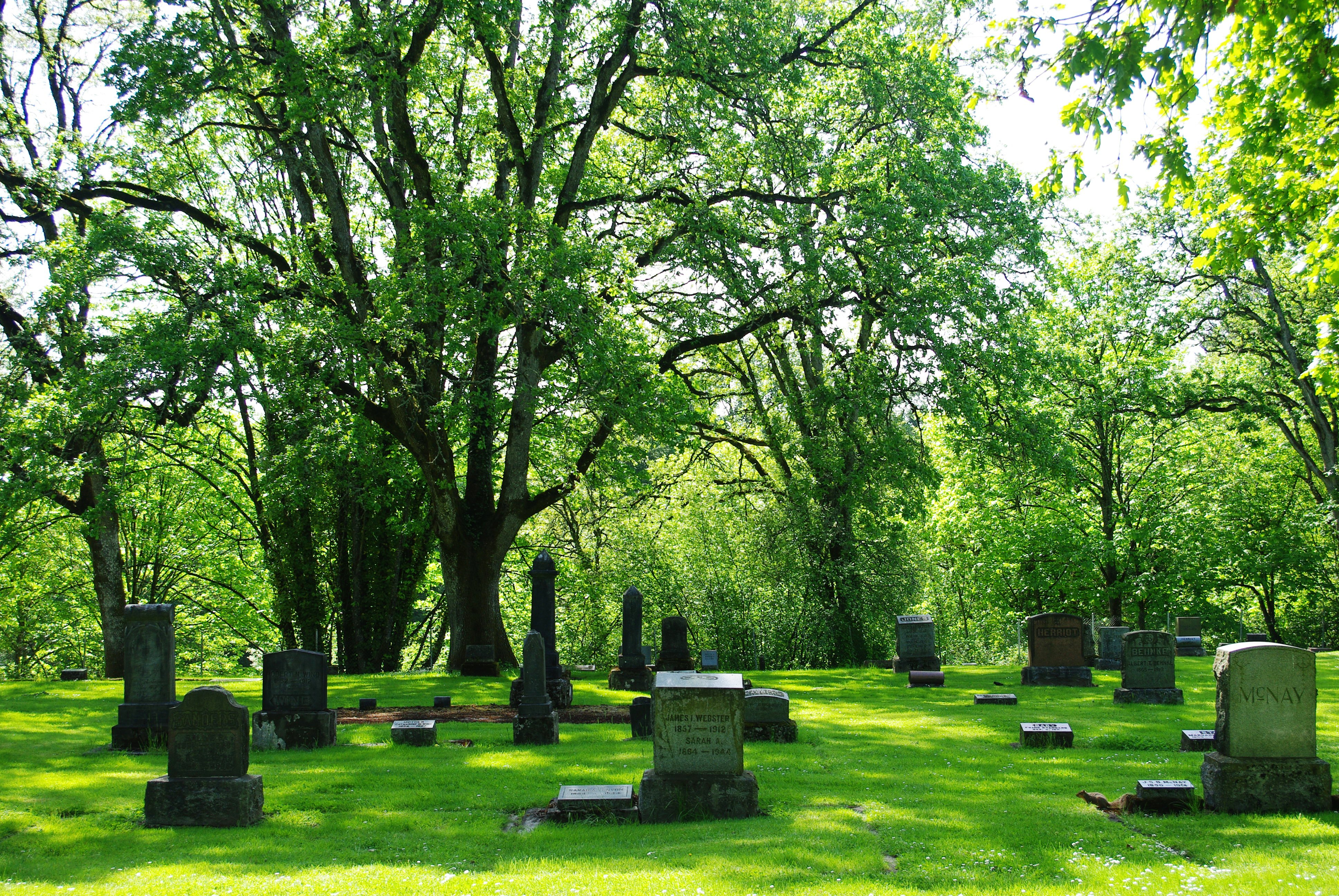
Fernwood Pioneer Cemetery near Newberg, Yamhill County

- Brookside Cemetery in Dayton; NRHP-listed
- Fernwood Pioneer Cemetery near Newberg; NRHP-listed

== See also ==
- Pioneer cemetery
- List of cemeteries in the United States
