= Pioneer Cemetery (disambiguation) =

A pioneer cemetery is a cemetery for the earliest settlers in an area.

Pioneer Cemetery or variations such as Pioneer Memorial Cemetery may also refer to:

in Australia

- Cleveland Pioneer Cemetery, Queensland
- Darwin Pioneer Cemetery, Northern Territory
- Gundaroo Catholic Pioneer Cemetery, New South Wales
- Kenwick Pioneer Cemetery, Western Australia
- Kingston Pioneer Cemetery, Queensland
- McLeod Street Pioneer Cemetery, Queensland
- Memorial Park Cemetery (Albany, Western Australia), or Pioneer Cemetery, Albany, Western Australia

in Canada

- Nutana Pioneer Cemetery, Saskatoon, Saskatchewan

in the United States

- Bothell Pioneer Cemetery, Bothell, Washington
- Columbia Pioneer Cemetery, Portland, Oregon
- Dublin Pioneer Cemetery, Dublin, California
- Eugene Pioneer Cemetery, Eugene, Oregon
- Fernwood Pioneer Cemetery, Newberg, Oregon
- Grand Canyon Pioneer Cemetery, Arizona
- Gresham Pioneer Cemetery, Gresham, Oregon
- Hillsboro Pioneer Cemetery, Hillsboro, Oregon
- Houston Pioneer Cemetery, Eau Gallie, Florida
- Milwaukie Pioneer Cemetery, Milwaukie, Oregon
- Mormon Pioneer Cemetery, Florence (Omaha), Nebraska
- Mt. Angel Pioneer Cemetery, Mt. Angel, Oregon
- Palarm Bayou Pioneer Cemetery, Pulaski County, Arkansas
- Pioneer Cemetery (Evans, New York)
- Pioneer Cemetery (Sidney, New York)
- Pioneer Memorial Cemetery, Cincinnati, Ohio
- Pioneer Memorial Cemetery (San Bernardino, California)
- Pioneer Park Cemetery, Dallas, Texas
- Salem Pioneer Cemetery, Salem, Oregon
- San Fernando Pioneer Memorial Cemetery, Los Angeles, California
- Sierra Madre Pioneer Cemetery, Sierra Madre, California

== See also ==
- List of pioneer cemeteries
