= Luper =

Luper may refer to:

- Luper, Oregon, a stop on the Oregon and California Railroad near Junction City, Oregon
- Luper Cemetery, pioneer cemetery near Junction City, Oregon
- Clara Luper (born 1923), African American activist
- Curtis Luper (born 1966), American football coach
- Kevi Luper (born 1990), American basketball player
- Tulse Luper, fictional ornithologist created by Peter Greenaway
- Zoe Luper, a character from the daytime drama All My Children
- "Luper", a song by Earl Sweatshirt from his mixtape Earl
