= Miyo Iwakoshi =

Japanese settler in Oregon

- Born: 1852; Japan
- Died: January 19, 1931 (aged 78–79); Portland, Oregon, U.S.
- Resting place: Gresham Pioneer Cemetery, Gresham, Oregon
- Known for: Being the first Japanese settler in Oregon
- Spouse: Andrew MacKinnon

Miyo Iwakoshi was one of the first Japanese settlers in Oregon, arriving in the state in 1880. She became known as the "Western Empress" among Japanese settlers due to her willingness to help Japanese immigrants travel and reside in Oregon.

== Biography ==
=== Early life ===
Evidence is limited on Iwakoshi's youth, but she appears to have come from a financially stable household in northern Japan. She adopted five-year-old Tama Jewel Nitobe prior to her departure from Japan. Nitobe's biological parents are noted as "unknown" on her birth certificate. While in Japan in 1879, Iwakoshi, age 27, met Australian-Scottish professor Captain Andrew MacKinnon, age 53. During this period, the Meiji Restoration of 1868 involved the Japanese government industrializing its agriculture, incentivizing foreigners like McKinnon to travel there and implement new techniques and expertise. At the time, McKinnon was in northern Japan teaching animal husbandry but hoped to travel to the United States. One year later, they set sail for the Oregon Coast.

=== Arrival to Oregon ===
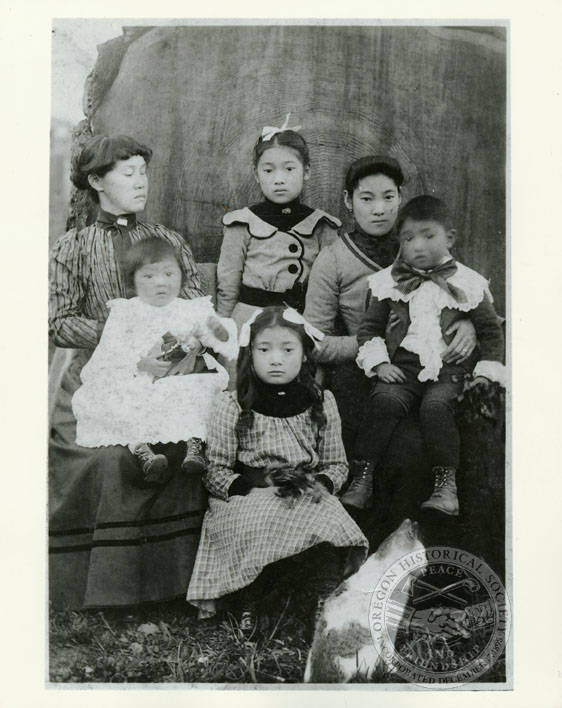
Miyo Iwakoshi (left) with her daughter Tama (right, holding child) and grandchildren

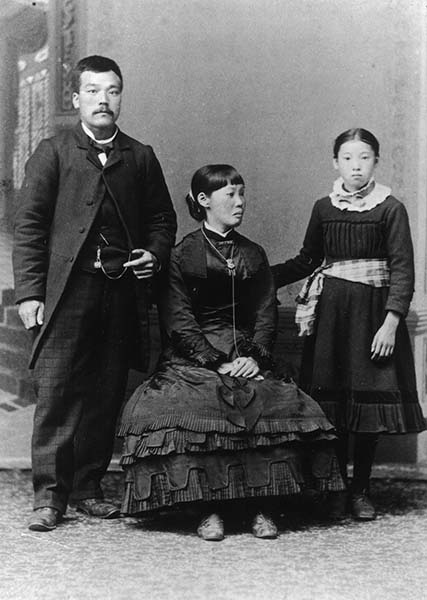
Miyo Iwakoshi (center), with her brother Riki (left) and daughter Tama Jewel Nitobe (right)

Iwakoshi arrived to Oregon in 1880 by ship via the Columbia River, setting anchor in Portland. She arrived with her husband Andrew McKinnon, her daughter Tama Nitobe, and her younger brother, Rikichi. After selling their ship, they migrated towards Gresham. They settled down in east Multnomah County, just on the outskirts of Gresham. McKinnon built the Orient Mill and named it after his wife. To build the mill they received some assistance from a friend, Captain Robert Smith. The Orient sawmill helped Iwakoshi and her family survive, and later on served as the name of the surrounding community that formed, Orient. Five years after their start in Oregon, McKinnon died.

Initially, as the first female issei in Oregon, it was challenging having no other women of the same nationality. Many Japanese people at this time faced exclusionary policies and mindsets from the US government. Anti-Japanese sentiment shifted into focus near the end of 1910 as World War I was fast approaching. A Japanese-exclusion movement formed within different communities due to competition in the agriculture world and hatred that formed as WWI began to commence. However, with time more Nikkei came to the farming regions of Gresham and dispersed throughout the area. With the agricultural decline and social unrest in Japan due to the Meiji Restoration of 1868, a large population of issei immigrated to the United States in hopes for employment and new opportunities. During this period, Iwakoshi earned the title of "Western Empress" as she provided resources, contracts, and advice to the incoming Japanese immigrants in the area.

In the spring of 1911, Iwakoshi imported silkworm cocoons from Japan to try and raise them. By June, She had a successful silkworm colony that produced hundreds of yards of fine pure white silk thread. The silk produced was equal in quality to silk made in other countries and she hoped to highlight the possibility of larger-scale silk production in Oregon.

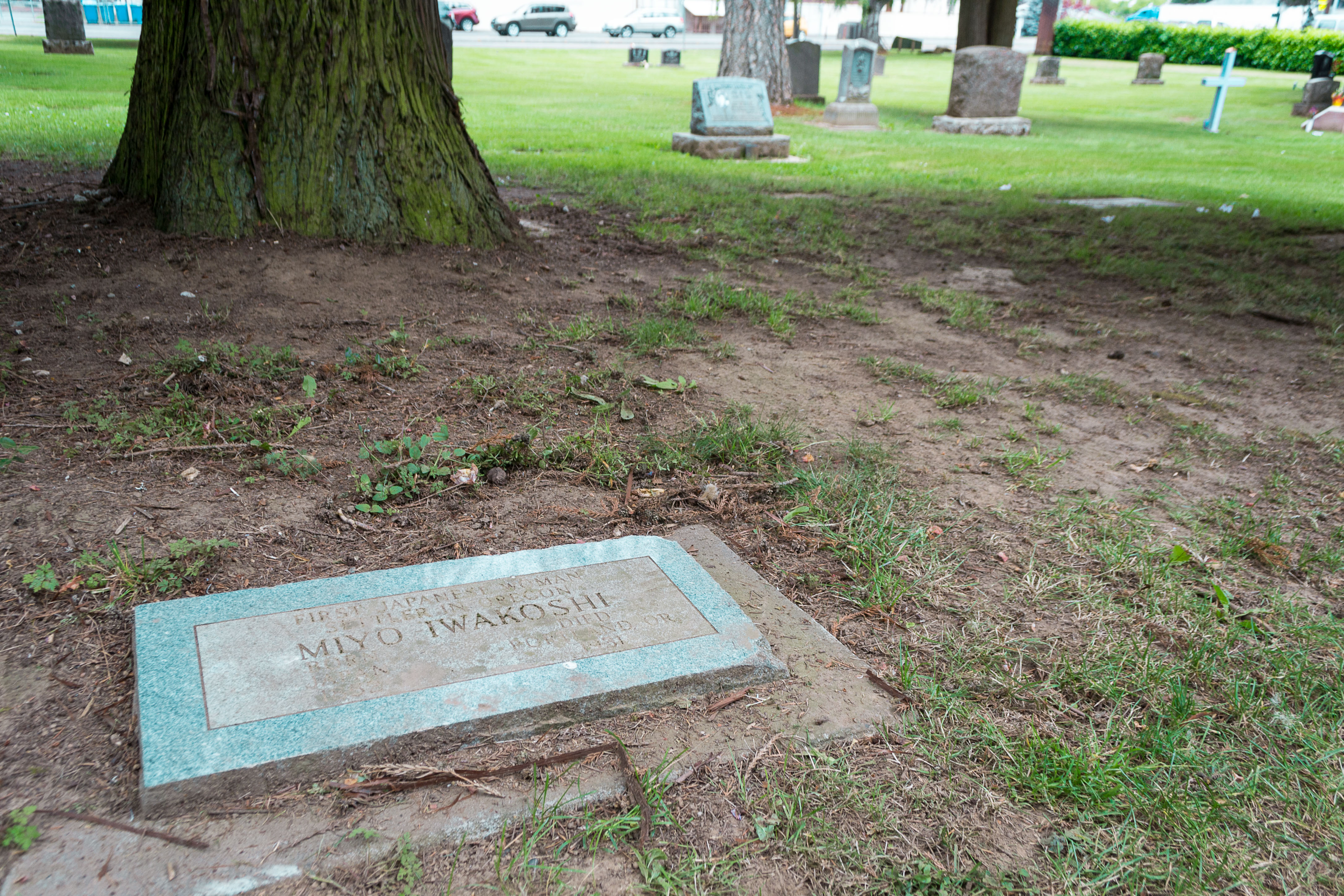
Granite headstone marking Miyo Iwakoshi's burial, implemented 1988

=== Death ===
Miyo Iwakoshi died in 1931 at 79 years old. She was provided with no headstone or clear marker as to where she was buried. At the time she died, anti-Japanese sentiment meant she would likely have been buried outside of the Pioneer Cemetery. An anti-Japanese sentiment group within Gresham, the Japanese Exclusion League, desired for any Japanese people to be buried in White Birch Cemetery rather than Pioneer Cemetery. It was assumed that she was buried outside of Pioneer Cemetery or in one of the other cemeteries. After further research, it was later discovered that she was buried close to McKinnon in Pioneer Cemetery, with a Japanese cedar marking her grave. In 1988, the Japanese American Citizens League and the Gresham Historical Society contributed a granite headstone and a planted Japanese maple as a marker of her burial. As of 2021, the trees remain at the site.

== Family ==
Iwakoshi's daughter, Tama Nitobe, married Japanese restaurant business owner Shintaro Takaki in 1891, when she was 16 years old. They became the first Oregon Japanese immigrant family with their six children. By 1973, three of Miyo's grandchildren were deceased; a grandson and granddaughter were shot, and one grandson died in a car accident.
