= Orient, Oregon =

Unincorporated community in the state of Oregon, United States

- Census-designated place
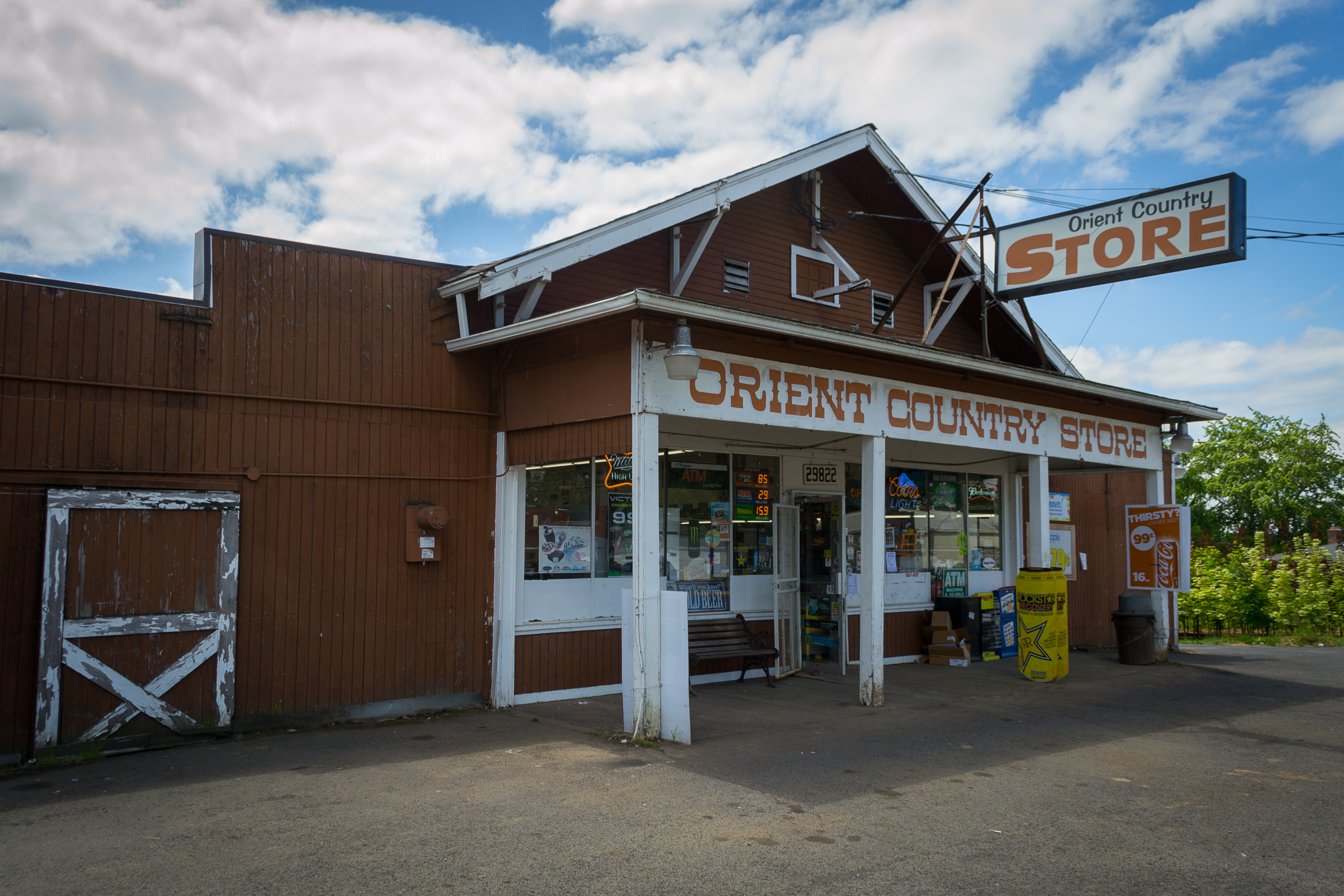
- The country store in Orient

- Location within Oregon Location within the United States
- Coordinates: 45°28′02″N 122°21′09″W
- Country: United States
- State: Oregon
- County: Multnomah
- Established: c. 1880

Area
  - Total: 0.95 sq mi (2.45 km^{2})
  - Land: 0.95 sq mi (2.45 km^{2})
  - Water: 0 sq mi (0.00 km^{2})
- Elevation: 558 ft (170 m)

Population (2020)
  - Total: 462
  - Density: 487.9/sq mi (188.37/km^{2})
- Time zone: UTC-8 (Pacific (PST))
  - Summer (DST): UTC-7 (PDT)
- ZIP Code: 97080 (Gresham)
- Area code: 503
- FIPS code: 41-55500
- GNIS feature ID: 1136602

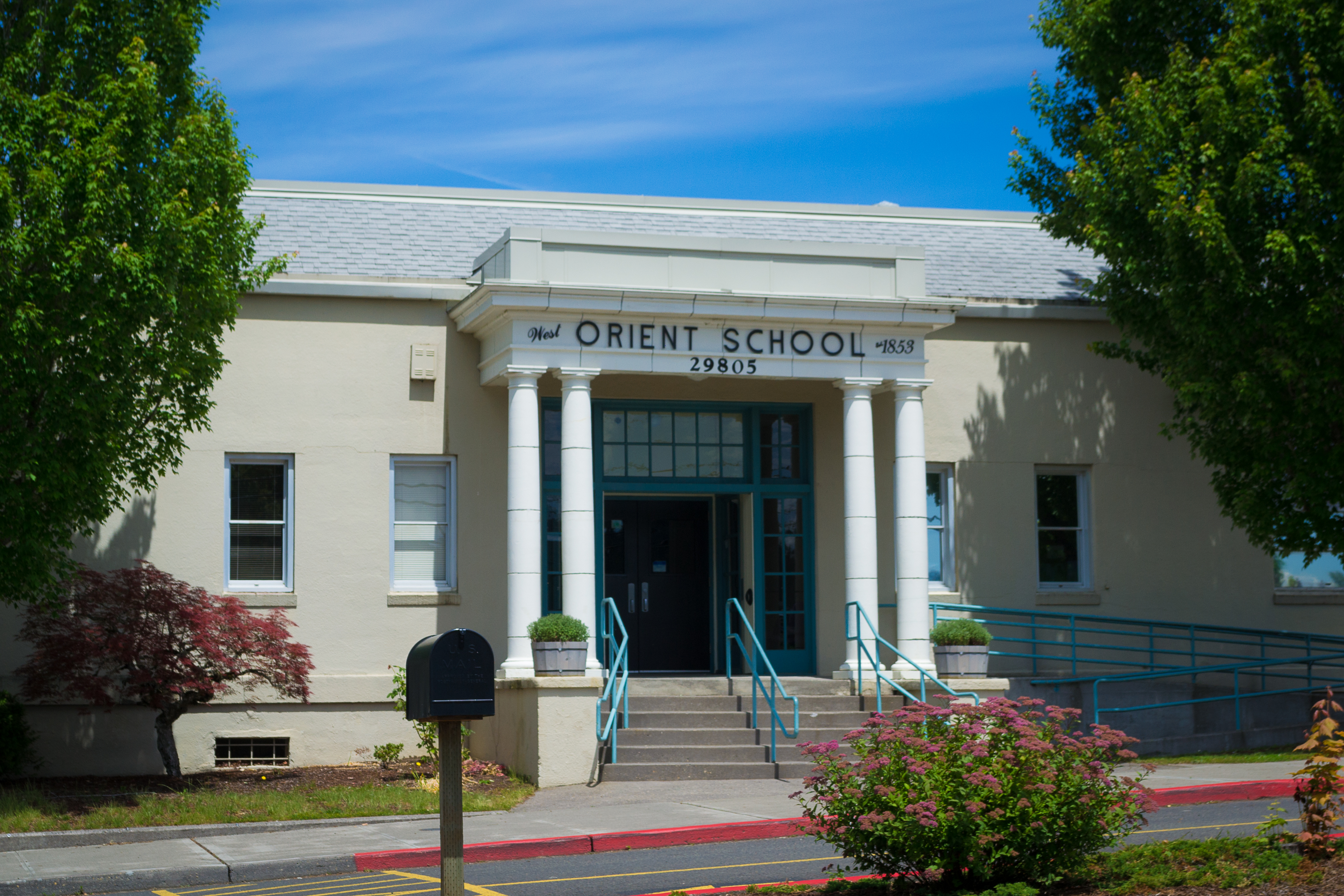
West Orient Middle School

Orient is an unincorporated community and census-designated place (CDP) in Multnomah County, Oregon, United States. As of the 2020 census, it had a population of 462. The community is at the junction of SE Orient Drive and 302nd Avenue, near Gresham, at the rough location of the former Orient Post Office.

The area was home to the Orient Mill, a steam-driven sawmill founded by Andrew MacKinnon, an 1880 Scottish immigrant. MacKinnon's wife, Miyo Iwakoshi, was the first Japanese citizen to settle in Oregon.

== Geography ==
Orient is in southern Multnomah County, adjacent to the southeast corner of the city of Gresham. The Clackamas County line forms the southern border of the community. Downtown Portland is 17 miles (27 km) to the west-northwest.

According to the U.S. Census Bureau, the Orient CDP has an area of 0.95 square miles (2.46 km^{2}), all land. Johnson Creek passes through the southern part of the community, flowing west to join the Willamette River at Milwaukie. Kelly Creek forms the northern border of the community and flows northwest to Beaver Creek, a tributary of the Sandy River, which joins the Columbia River north of Troutdale.

== Demographics ==
Historical population
Census	Pop.	Note	%±
2020	462		—
U.S. Decennial Census
