= Gresham Pioneer Cemetery =

Cemetery in Gresham, Oregon, U.S.

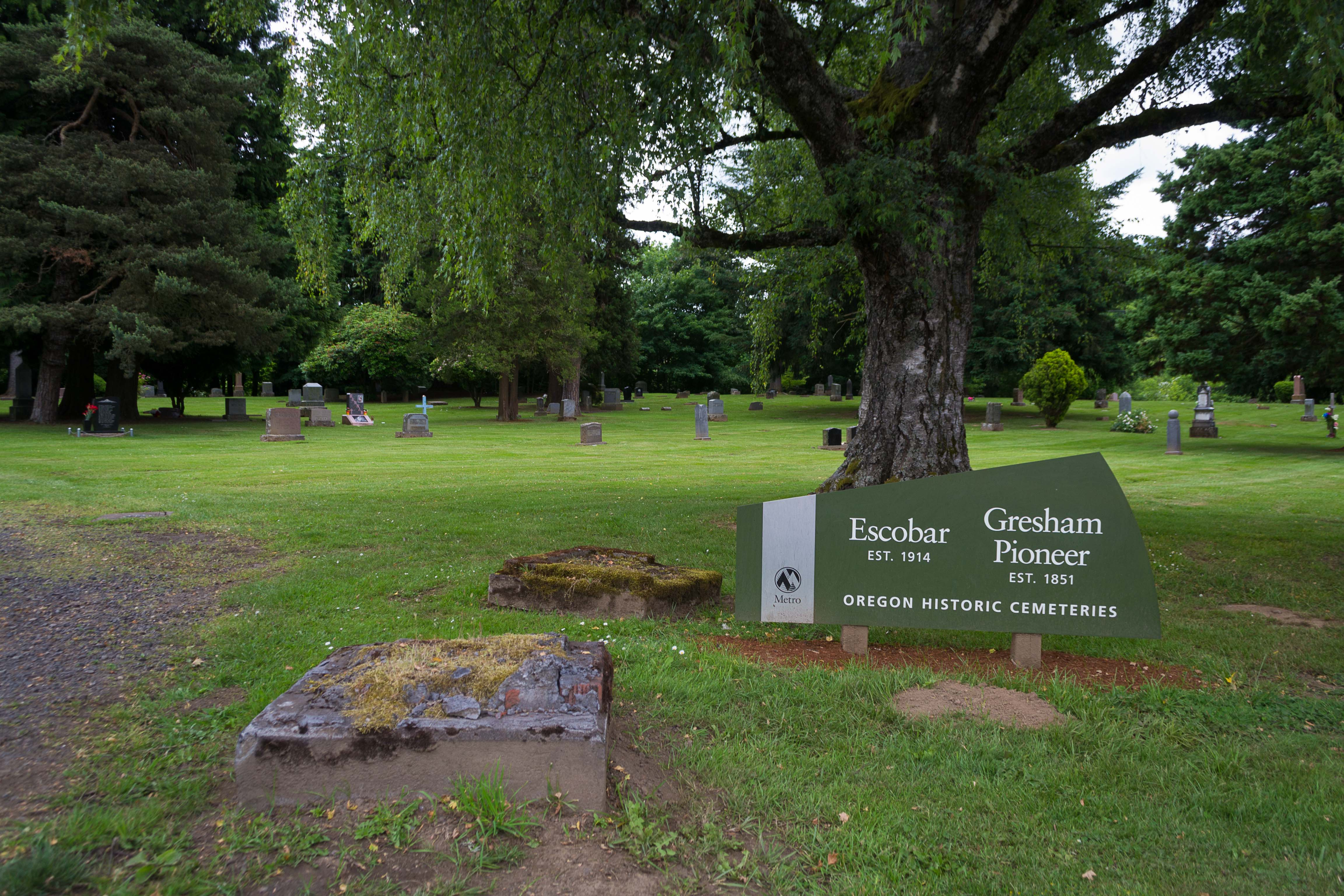
- Gresham Pioneer Cemetery and Escobar Cemetery

Details
- Location: Gresham, Oregon
- Country: United States
- Coordinates: 45.49614°N 122.43360°W

Gresham Pioneer Cemetery, founded in 1859, lies on the east side of Southwest Walters Road in Gresham, Oregon, United States. The cemetery is bordered by the Springwater Corridor Trail and Johnson Creek on the south and by Escobar Cemetery, adjacent on the west and not clearly separated from Gresham Pioneer Cemetery. White Birch Cemetery, founded in 1888, lies on the west side of Southwest Walters Road across from the other two cemeteries. All are one block west of Gresham's Main City Park and about a half-block south of Southeast Powell Boulevard.

The Gresham Pioneer Cemetery is owned and maintained by Metro, the regional government for the Oregon part of the Portland metropolitan area. Miyo Iwakoshi, thought to be the first Japanese person to live in Oregon, is buried here. Metro provides a downloadable map of the cemetery, although names are not listed.

The three cemeteries are among the 14 pioneer cemeteries in Multnomah County, Oregon, that are managed by Metro. The others are Brainard Cemetery, Columbia Pioneer Cemetery, Douglass Cemetery, Grand Army of the Republic Cemetery, Jones Cemetery, Lone Fir Cemetery, Mountain View Corbett Cemetery, Mountain View Stark Cemetery, Multnomah Park Cemetery, Pleasant Home Cemetery, and Powell Grove Cemetery.

== See also ==
- Escobar Cemetery
