= Escobar Cemetery =

Cemetery in Gresham, Oregon, U.S.

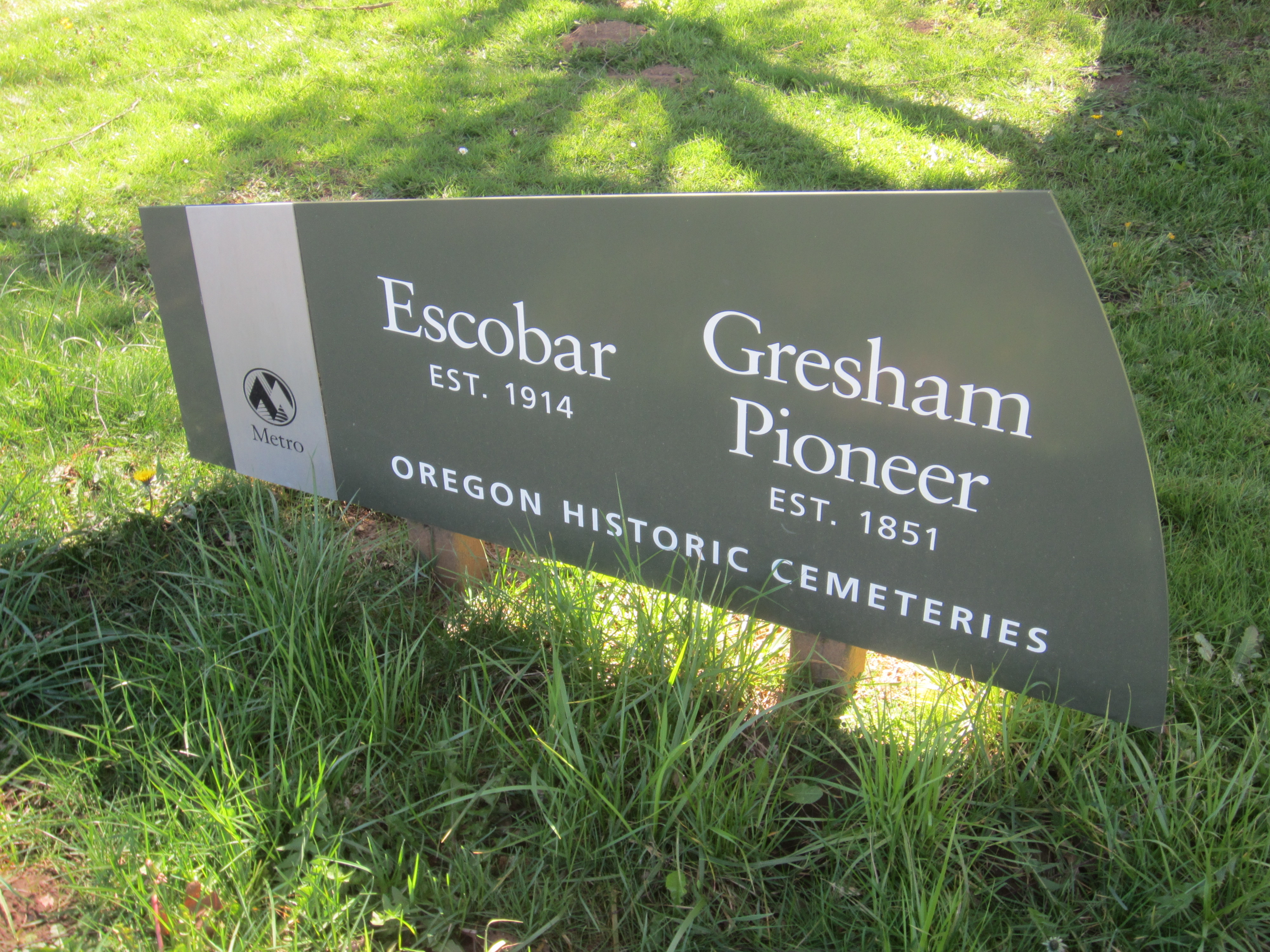
- Sign for the cemetery and neighboring Gresham Pioneer Cemetery, 2021

Details
- Established: 1914
- Location: Gresham, Oregon
- Country: United States
- Coordinates: 45.4966°N 122.4344°W
- Owned by: Metro
- Find a Grave: Escobar Cemetery

Escobar Cemetery is a cemetery in Gresham, Oregon, established in 1914.

According to Metro, the cemetery is named after Frank Escobar and was acquired by Multnomah County in 1957.

As of 2014, the cemetery continues to be operated by Metro.

== See also ==
- Gresham Pioneer Cemetery
- White Birch Cemetery
