= Luper, Oregon =

- Ghost town
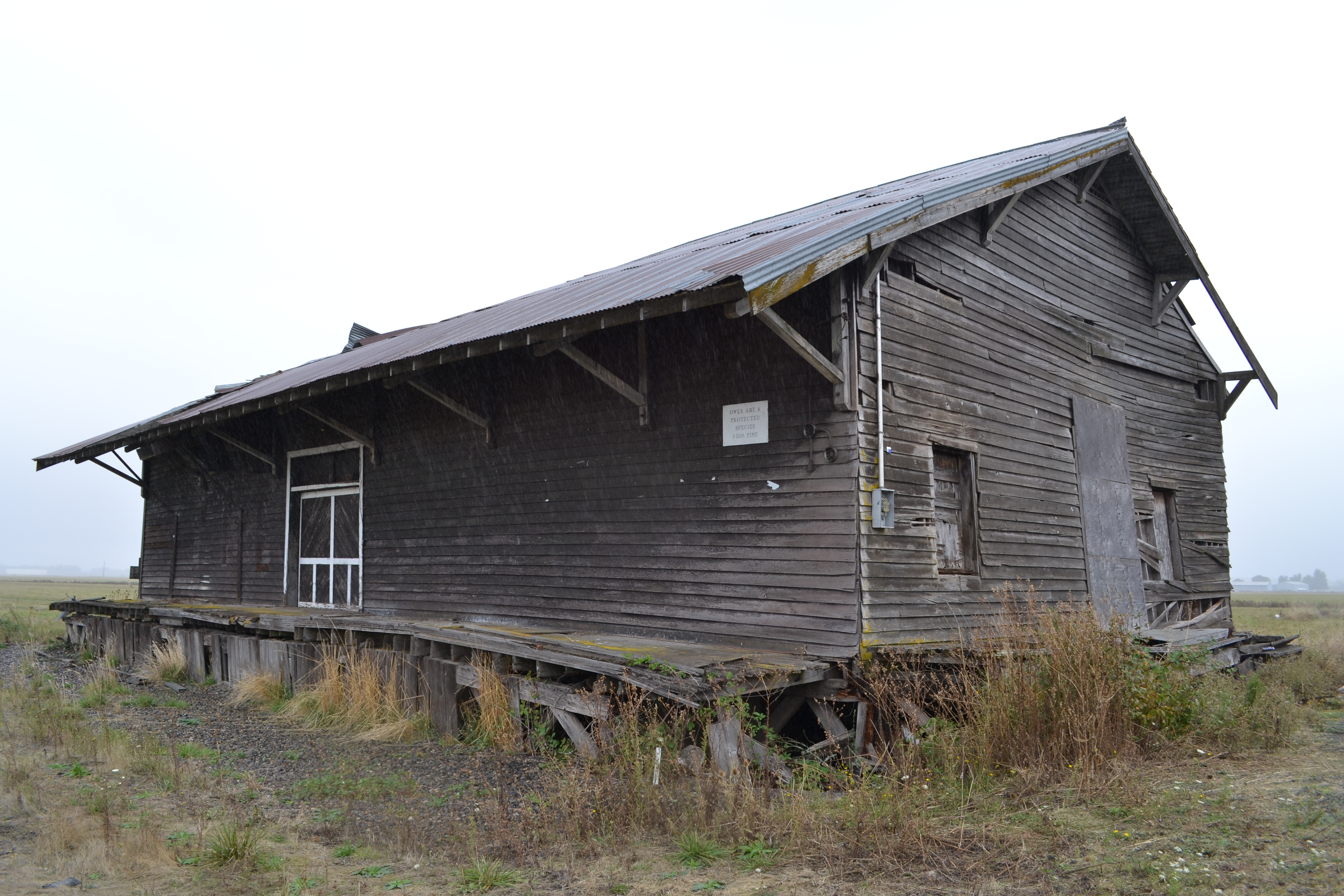

- Location within Oregon Location within the United States
- Coordinates: 44°08′34″N 123°10′54″W
- Country: United States
- State: Oregon
- County: Lane
- Elevation: 364 ft (111 m)
- Time zone: UTC-8 (Pacific (PST))
  - Summer (DST): UTC-7 (PDT)
- ZIP code: 97448
- GNIS feature ID: 1166735

Luper, Oregon is a ghost town in Lane County, Oregon, United States. Originally a train station on the Oregon and California Railroad between Junction City and Eugene, Luper was located near Meadowview Road between Oregon Route 99W and Prairie Road, about 3.8 miles (6.1 km) south of Junction City. The community was named for James N. Luper, a pioneer born in 1852 in Illinois. The Luper Cemetery remains in the area. In 1970, the Oregon Genealogical Society counted 118 grave sites.

James Luper's daughter, Oregon State Engineer Rhea Luper, recalled in 1927 that her father had purchased the Luper-area property around 1870, and thereafter constructed a warehouse and railroad spur. The area became a shipping point for wheat.
