= Sisters' Cemetery =

Cemetery in Marylhurst, Clackamas County, Oregon, US

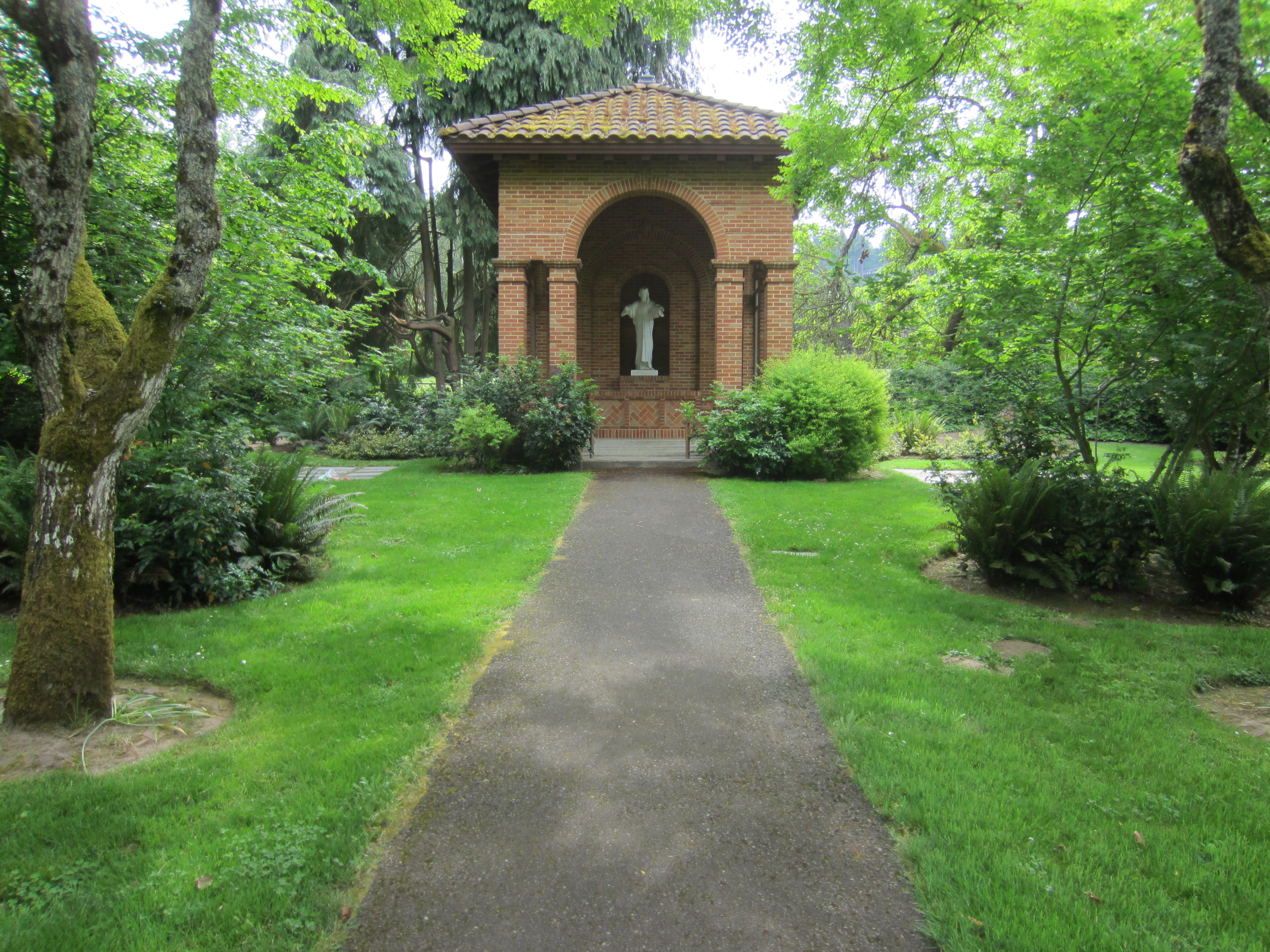
- Altar in 2018
- Interactive map of Sisters' Cemetery

Details
- Location: Marylhurst, Oregon
- Country: United States
- Coordinates: 45.3969°N 122.6500°W

Sisters' Cemetery, also known as Holy Names Cemetery, is a cemetery adjacent to the Marylhurst University campus, in Marylhurst, Oregon, United States. It is owned by the Sisters of the Holy Names of Jesus and Mary (SNJM), U.S.-Ontario Province and maintained by the SNJM Oregon Regional Office.

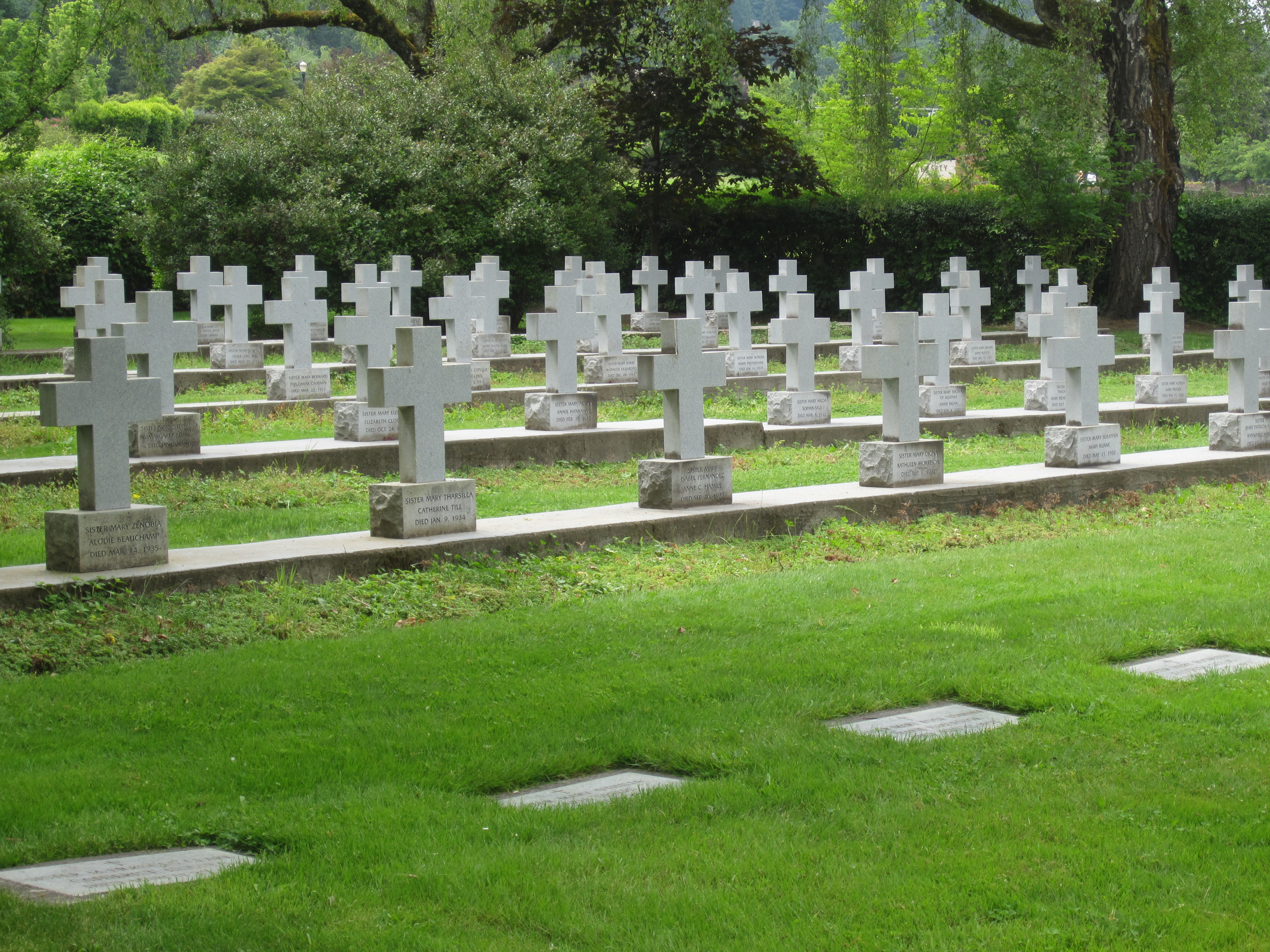
Headstones, 2018
