= Brainard Cemetery =

Cemetery in Portland, Oregon, U.S.

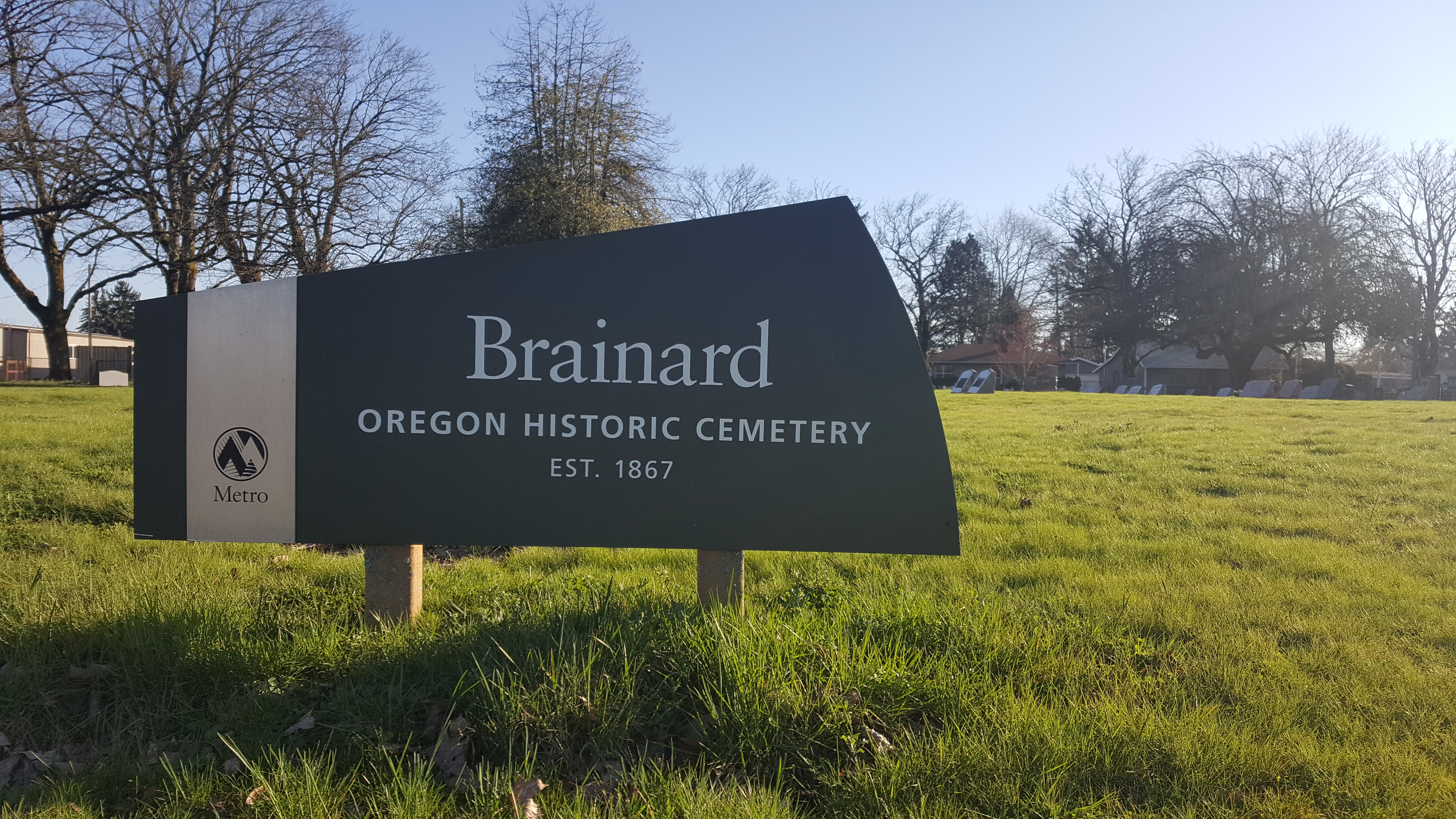
- Sign for the cemetery, 2022
- Interactive map of Brainard Cemetery

Details
- Location: Portland, Oregon
- Country: United States
- Coordinates: 45°31′34″N 122°34′18″W
- Size: 1.1 acres (0.45 ha)

Brainard Cemetery is a historic 1.1-acre (0.45 ha) cemetery in Portland, Oregon's Montavilla neighborhood, in the United States. Operated by Metro, the cemetery was acquired by Multnomah County in 1953.

== See also ==
- List of cemeteries in Oregon
