= Ashland Cemetery =

Historic cemetery in Jackson County, Oregon, US

- U.S. National Register of Historic Places
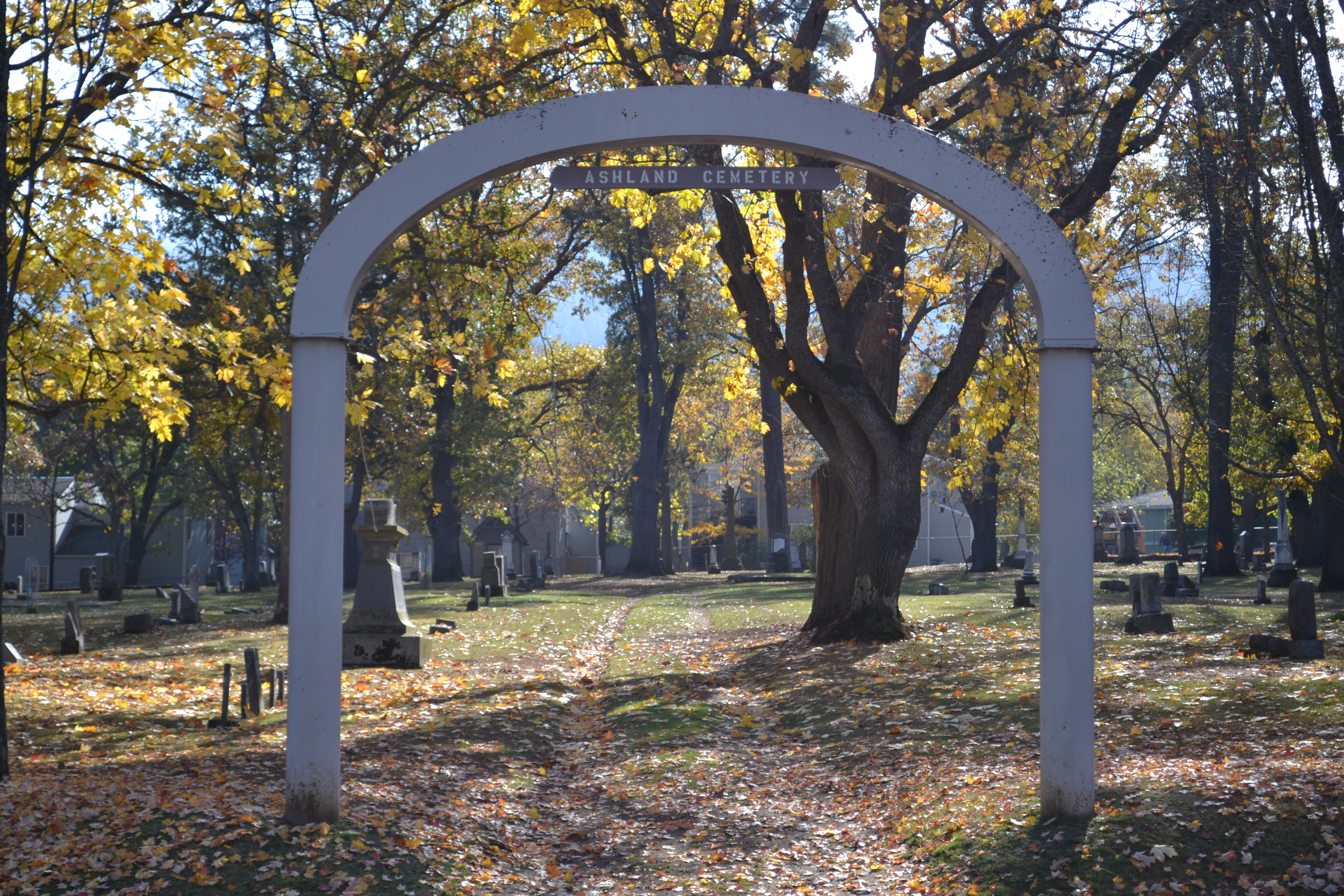
- The cemetery in 2011

- Location within Oregon Location within the United States
- Location: 750 East Main Street, Ashland, Oregon
- Coordinates: 42°11′37″N 122°42′18″W
- Area: 5 acres (2.0 ha)
- Built: 1873
- MPS: Historic Cemeteries of Ashland MPS
- NRHP reference No.: 95000687
- Added to NRHP: June 8, 1995

Ashland Cemetery is a cemetery in Ashland, Oregon, in the United States. It is listed on the National Register of Historic Places. Notable burials include Lindsay Applegate and Abel Helman.

== See also ==
- National Register of Historic Places listings in Jackson County, Oregon
