= Hargadine Cemetery =

Historic cemetery in Jackson County, Oregon, US

Coordinates: 42°12′35″N 122°43′38″W

- U.S. National Register of Historic Places
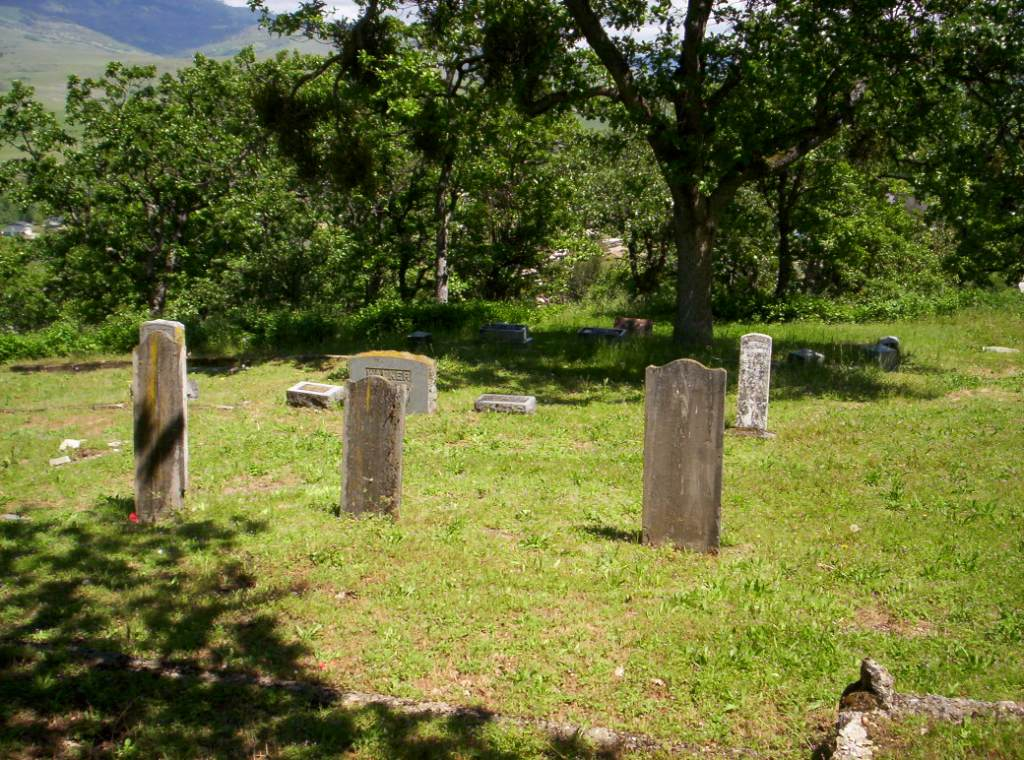
- Hargadine Cemetery
- Location: Ashland, Oregon
- Area: 1.5 acres (6,100 m^{2})
- Built: 1867
- NRHP reference No.: 98000627
- Added to NRHP: 1998

Hargadine Cemetery is a cemetery in Ashland, Oregon, United States. It was established in 1867.

Located on a hill on the north end of the city, the cemetery was named after its first interment, Katie Hargadine, the one-year-old daughter of town pioneer Robert Hargadine. She was buried there on December 8, 1867, and was shortly followed by the burial of another child, Cuyler Farnham, two weeks later.

The property was originally owned by James Haworth who deeded one and one-half acres to the two families "for the purpose of a Cemetery or Grave Yard for the burial of the dead and for no other purpose." Many of Ashland's pioneer families are buried there.

The cemetery was managed by the Hargadine Cemetery Association established by Robert Hargadine's widow in the late 19th century until the mid-1930s. Proposals for city management were delayed by the Great Depression and World War II and were not finalized until an act of the Oregon Legislature in 1989.

The cemetery was added to the National Register of Historic Places in 1998.

Hargadine is pronounced Här-guh-dïne. The first syllable, "Har" is the same as the word 'hard'. The second syllable is the same as the "gu" sound in 'gutter'. The last syllable is a long I, and is pronounced the same as in to 'dine' out.
