= Columbia Pioneer Cemetery =

Historic cemetery in Multnomah County, Oregon, US

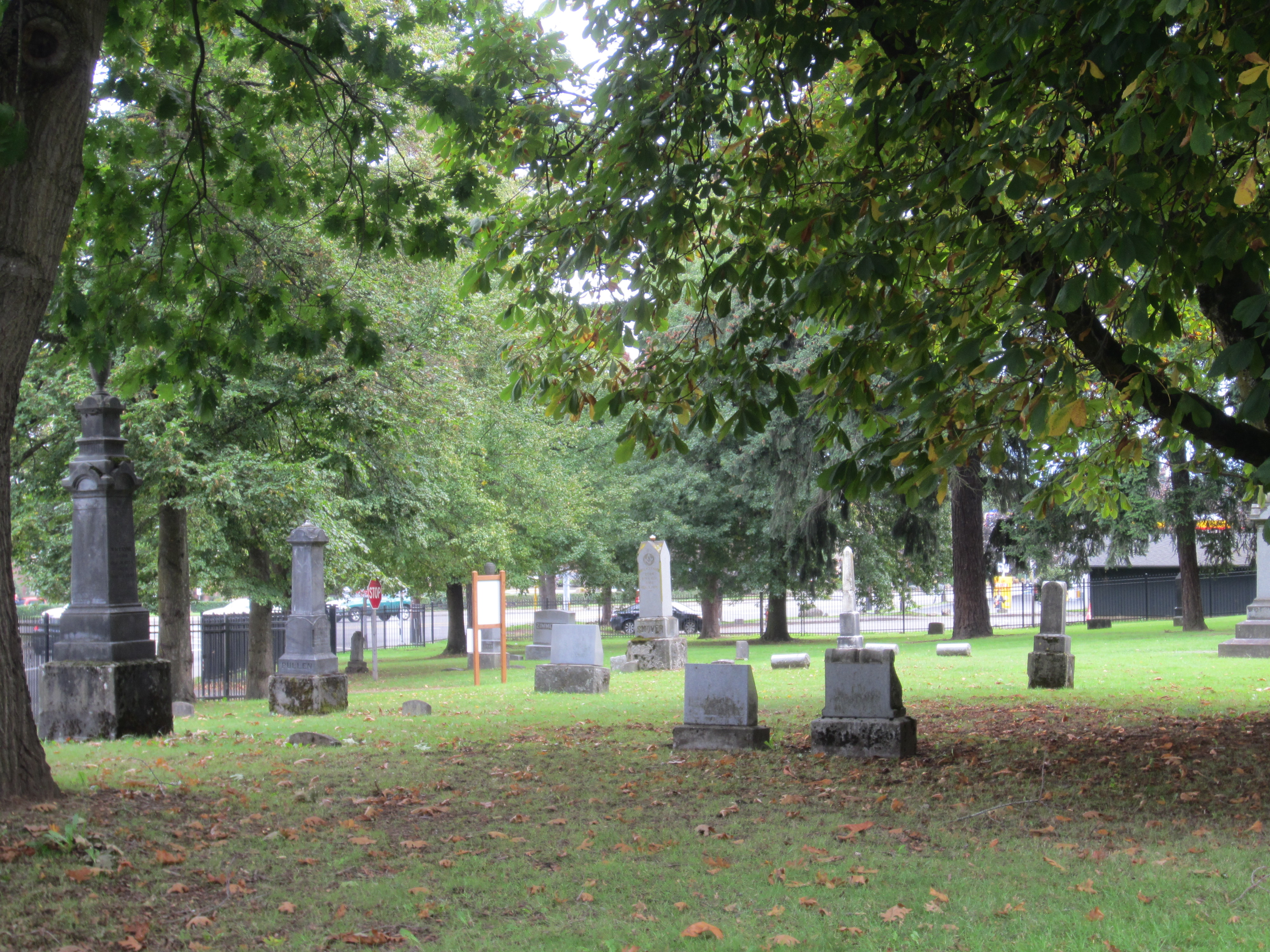
- The cemetery in 2020

Details
- Established: 1877
- Location: Portland, Oregon
- Country: United States
- Coordinates: 45°33′32″N 122°33′41″W
- Find a Grave: Columbia Pioneer Cemetery

Columbia Pioneer Cemetery (also known as Columbia Masonic Cemetery) is an historic cemetery in Portland, Oregon's Parkrose neighborhood, in the United States. The cemetery was established in 1877, and acquired by Multnomah County in 1951.
