= Luper Cemetery =

Cemetery located in Junction City, Oregon

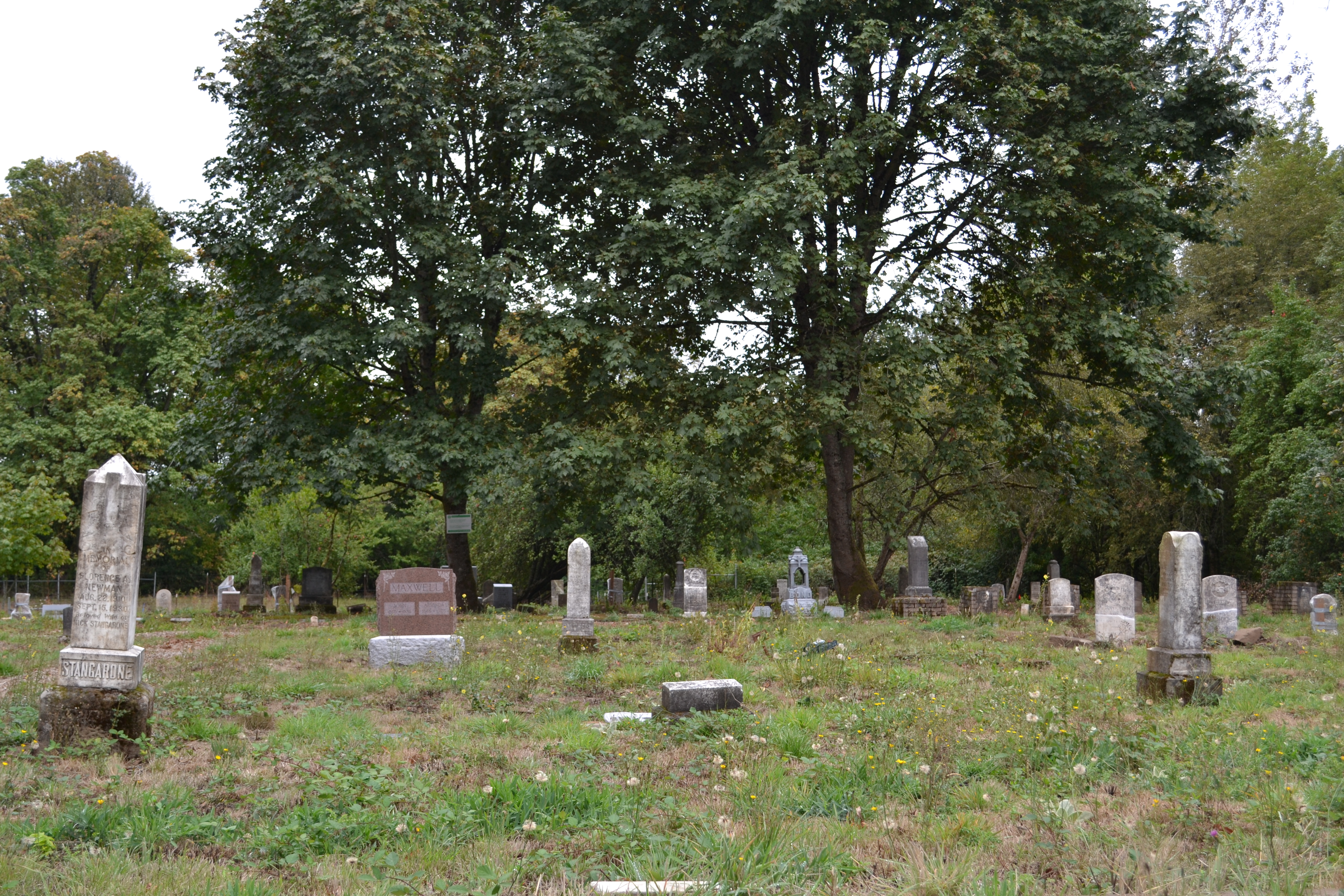

Details
- Established: 1859
- Location: Junction City, Oregon
- Country: United States
- Coordinates: 44°08′23″N 123°09′36″W
- Type: Private
- Owned by: Luper Cemetery, Inc.
- Size: 160 grave sites
- Website: www.lupercemetery.com

Luper Cemetery is a cemetery located near Eugene, Oregon, United States. It is one of the earliest cemeteries in the southern Willamette Valley. The site is also known as Irving Cemetery or Baker Cemetery. The first grave site was in 1857, although records indicate that the cemetery began in 1859, when land was donated by Thomas and Elizabeth Baker.

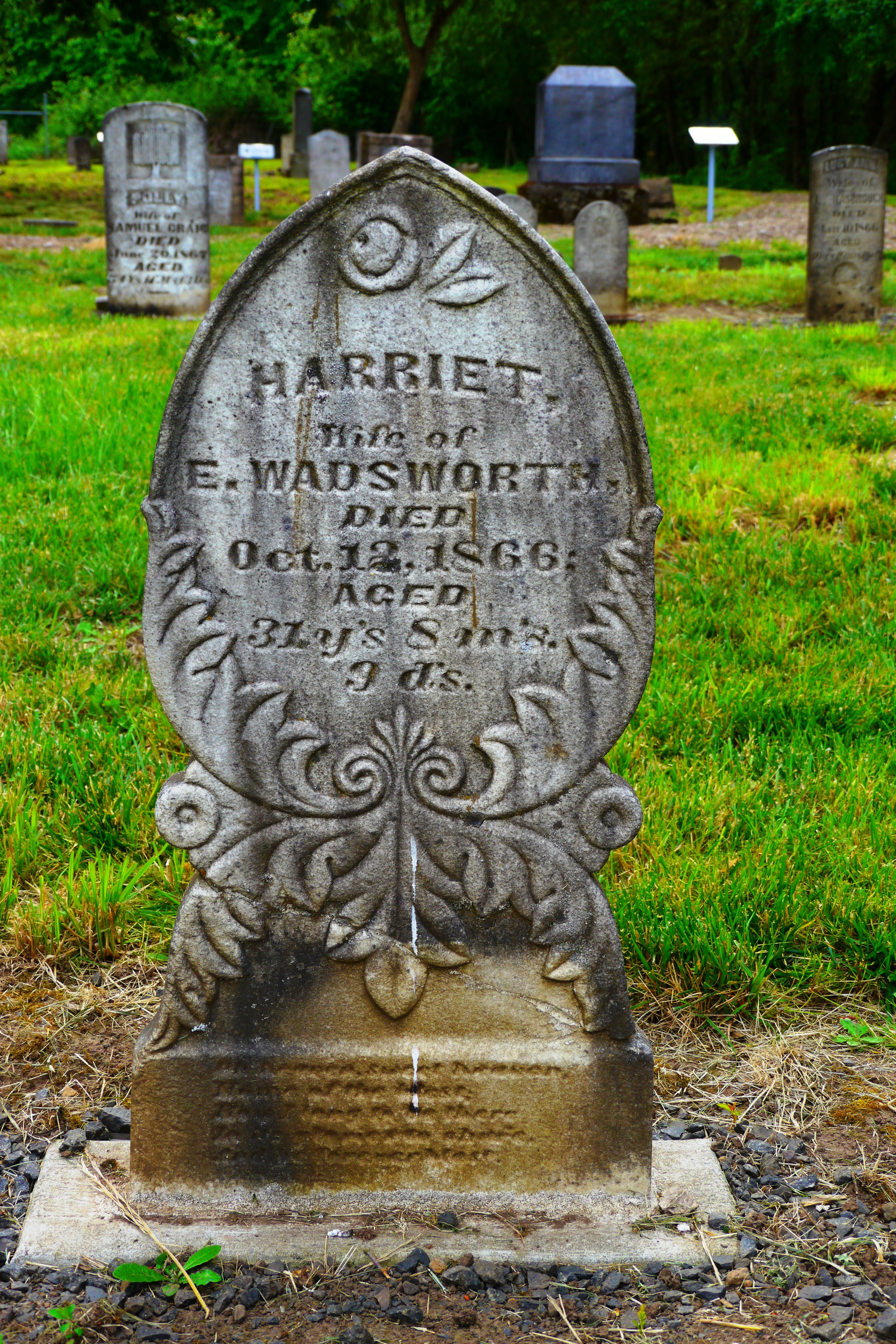
Harriet Wadsworth died in 1866

The cemetery is named after James Luper, an 1852 pioneer from Illinois, who settled nearby in an area known for a time as Luper, Oregon. James Luper owned the land surrounding the cemetery.

In 2011, almost all gravestones were broken or toppled.
