= Fernwood Pioneer Cemetery =

Historic cemetery in Yamhill County, Oregon, US

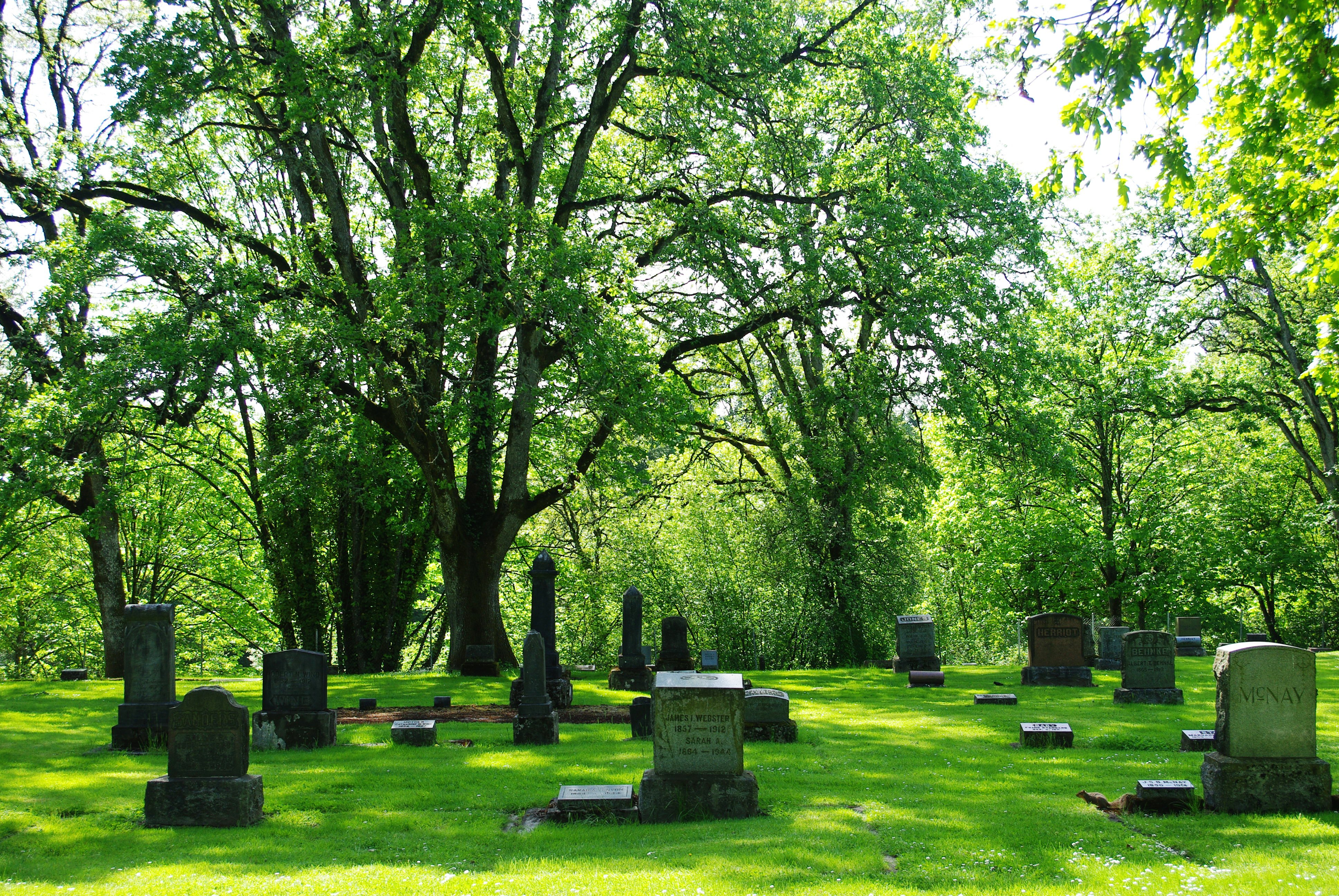
- The cemetery in 2009

Details
- Established: 1882
- Location: Newberg, Oregon
- Country: United States
- Coordinates: 45°17′41″N 122°57′34″W
- Type: Pioneer cemetery
- Website: Official website
- Find a Grave: Fernwood Pioneer Cemetery

Fernwood Pioneer Cemetery, also known as Everest Cemetery and the G.A.R Cemetery, is an historic cemetery situated in an unincorporated area of Yamhill County near Newberg, Oregon, United States. The one-acre site was established in 1882; many of the first settlers to the Newberg area were buried at the cemetery from then until 1922. It is listed on the National Register of Historic Places.

== See also ==
- National Register of Historic Places listings in Yamhill County, Oregon
