= Milwaukie Pioneer Cemetery =

Historic cemetery in Clackamas County, Oregon, US

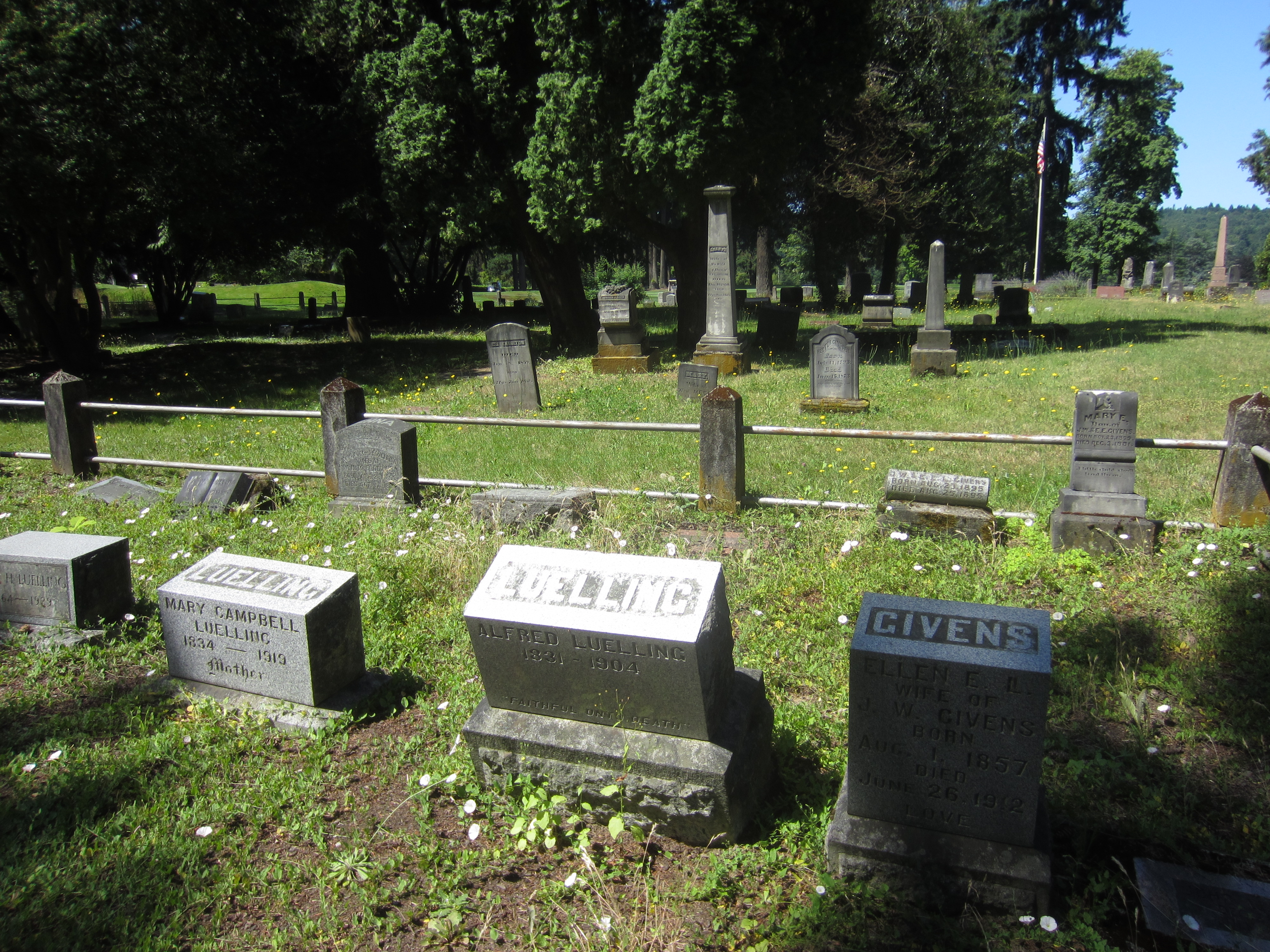
- Part of the cemetery in 2019

Details
- Established: 1869
- Location: Milwaukie, Oregon
- Country: United States
- Coordinates: 45°27′14″N 122°38′48″W
- Owned by: Milwaukie Pioneer Cemetery Association
- No. of graves: >2,100
- Website: Official website
- Find a Grave: Milwaukie Pioneer Cemetery

Milwaukie Pioneer Cemetery is an historic cemetery in Milwaukie, Oregon, United States.
