= Mt. Angel Pioneer Cemetery =

Historic cemetery in Marion County, Oregon, US

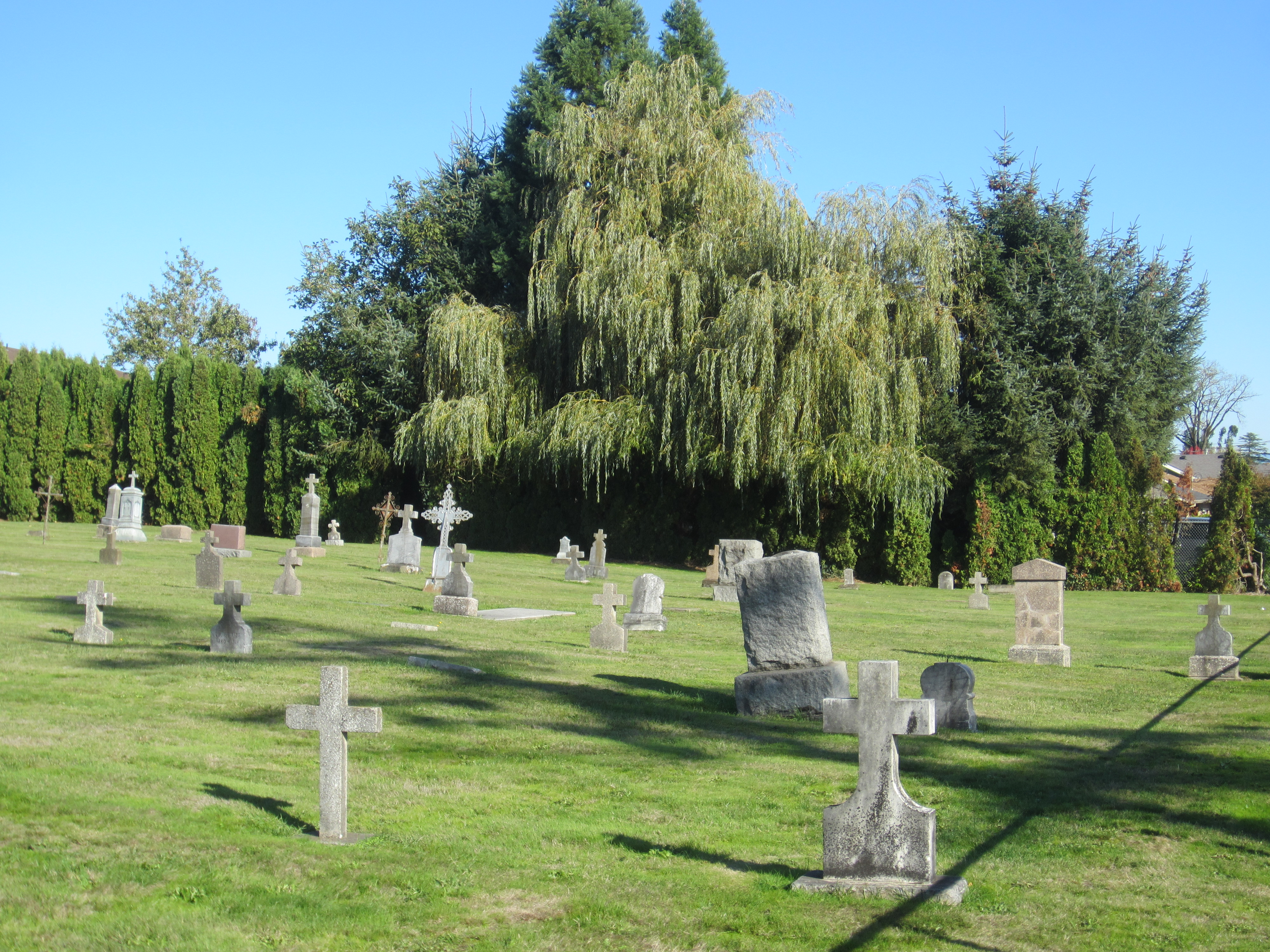
- The cemetery in 2020
- Interactive map of Mt. Angel Pioneer Cemetery

Details
- Location: Mt. Angel, Oregon
- Country: United States
- Coordinates: 45°04′18″N 122°47′47″W
- Find a Grave: Mt. Angel Pioneer Cemetery

Mt. Angel Pioneer Cemetery is an historic cemetery in Mt. Angel, Oregon, United States established in 1860.

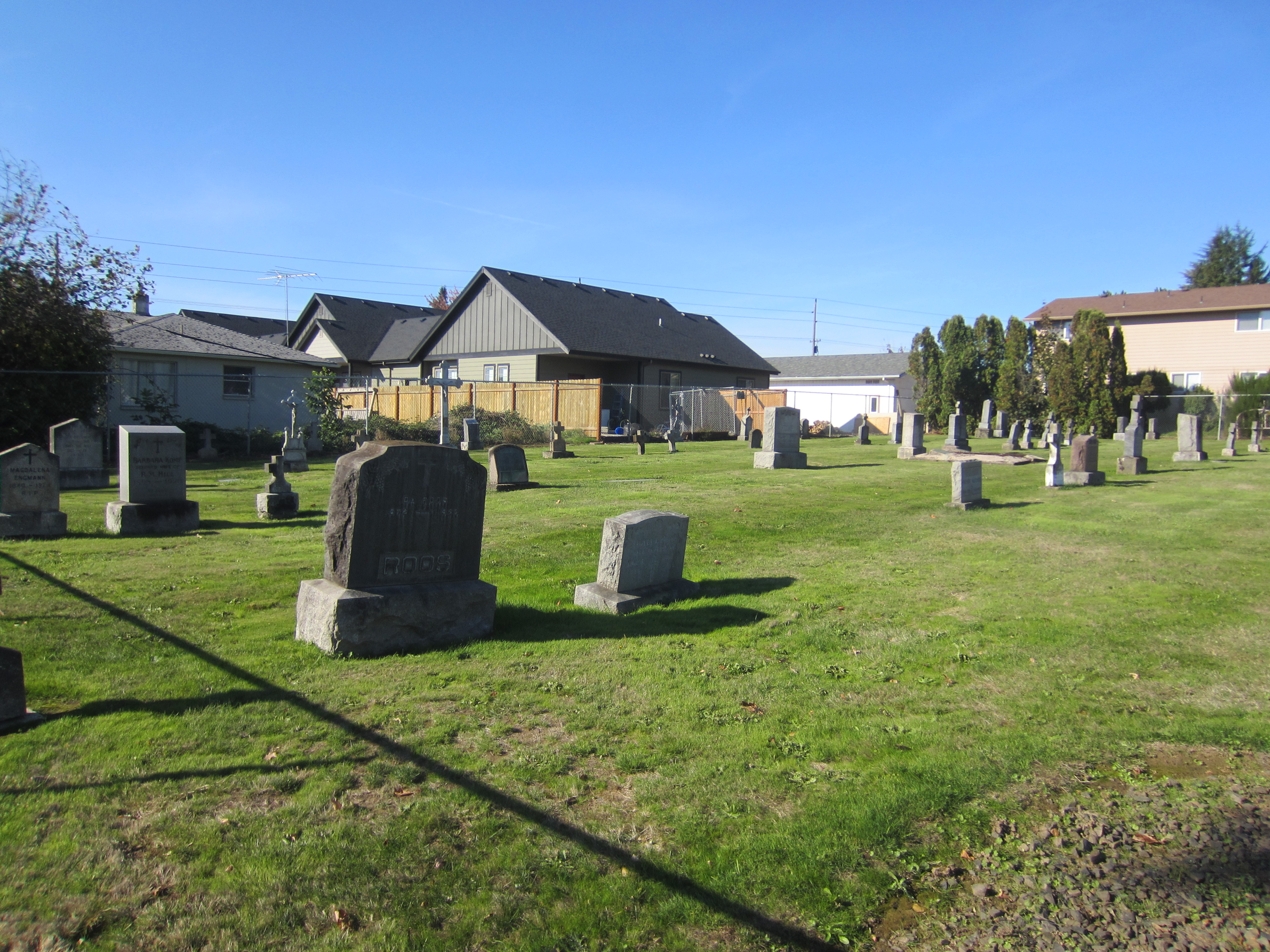

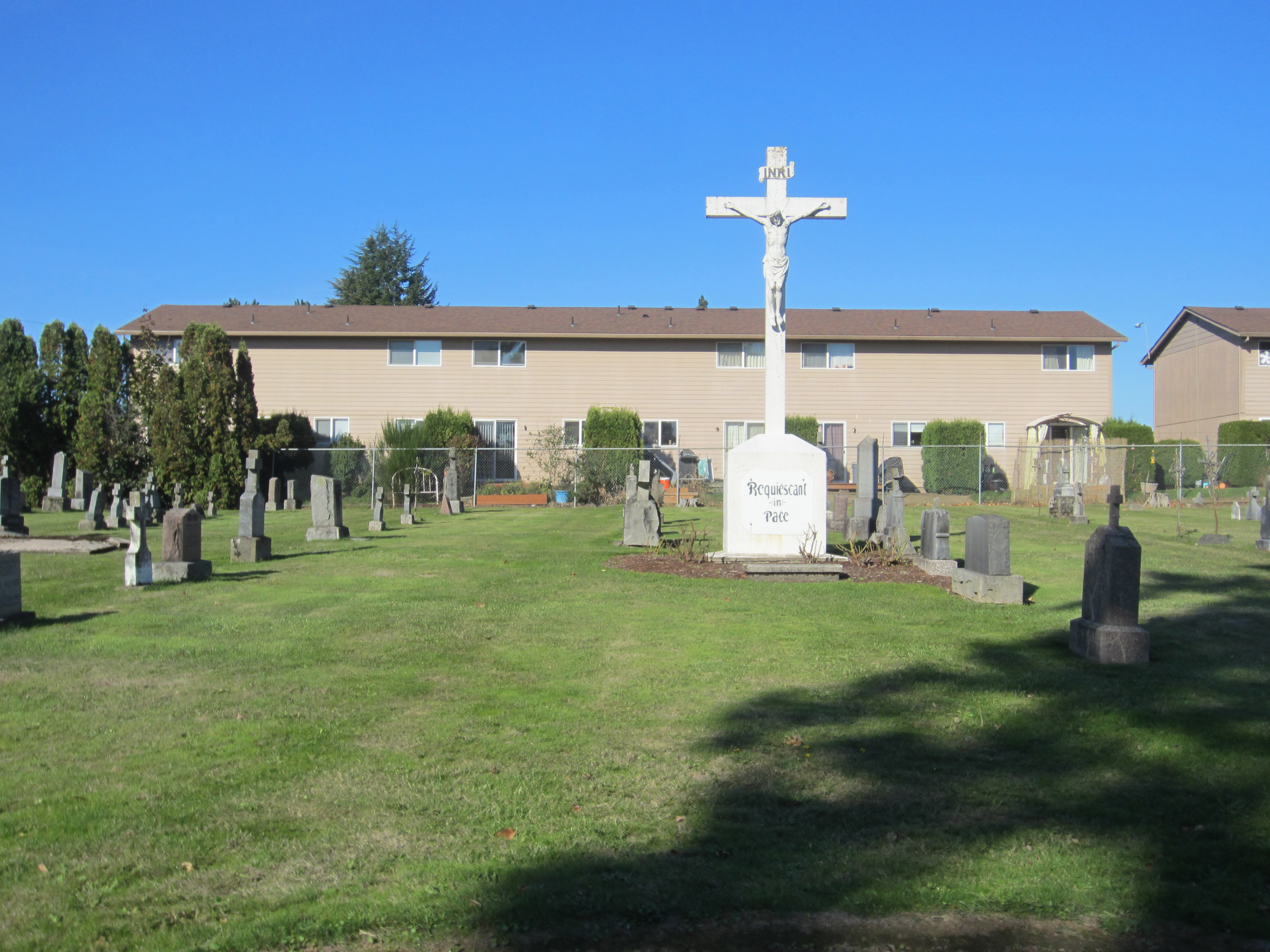

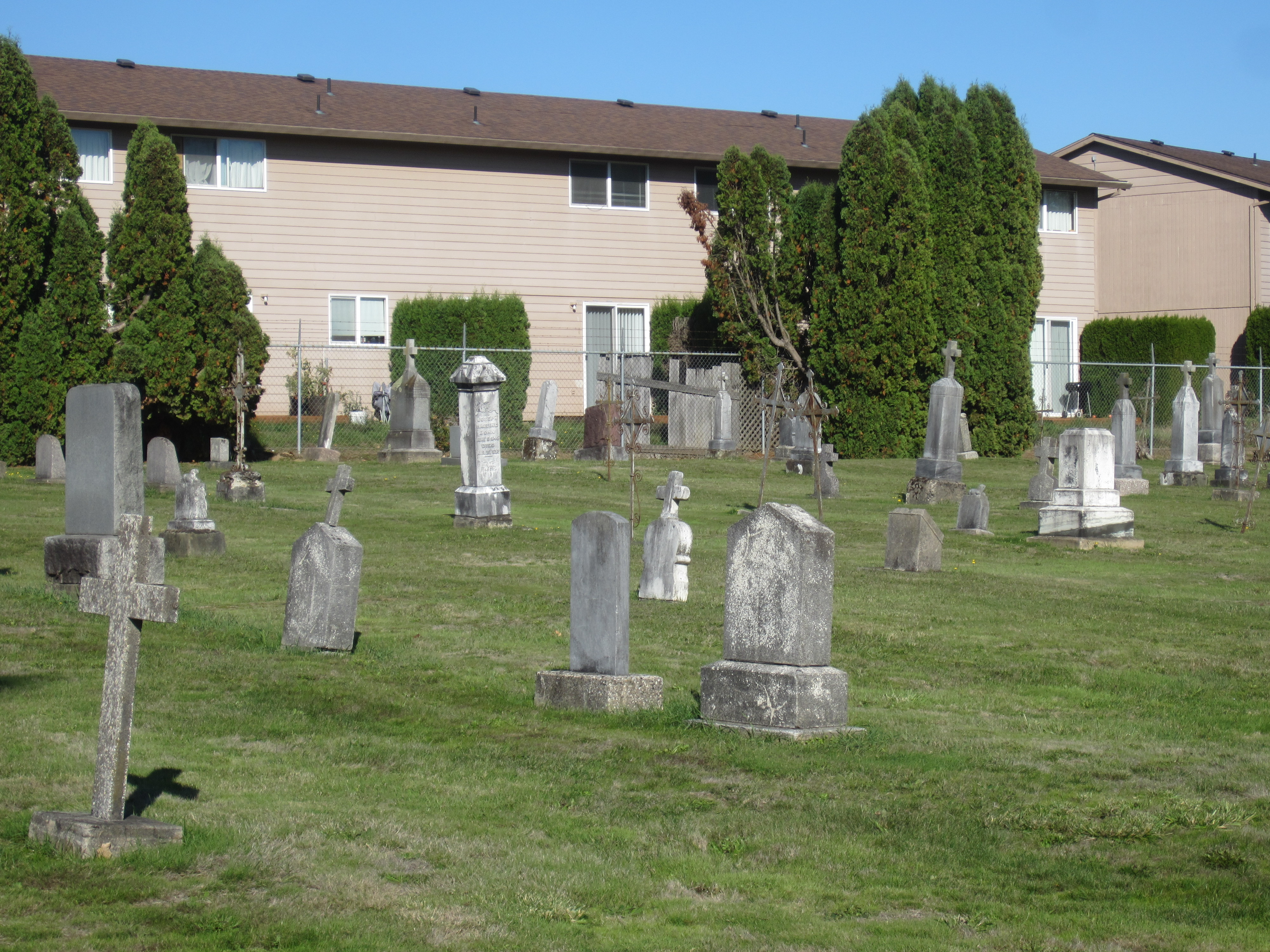

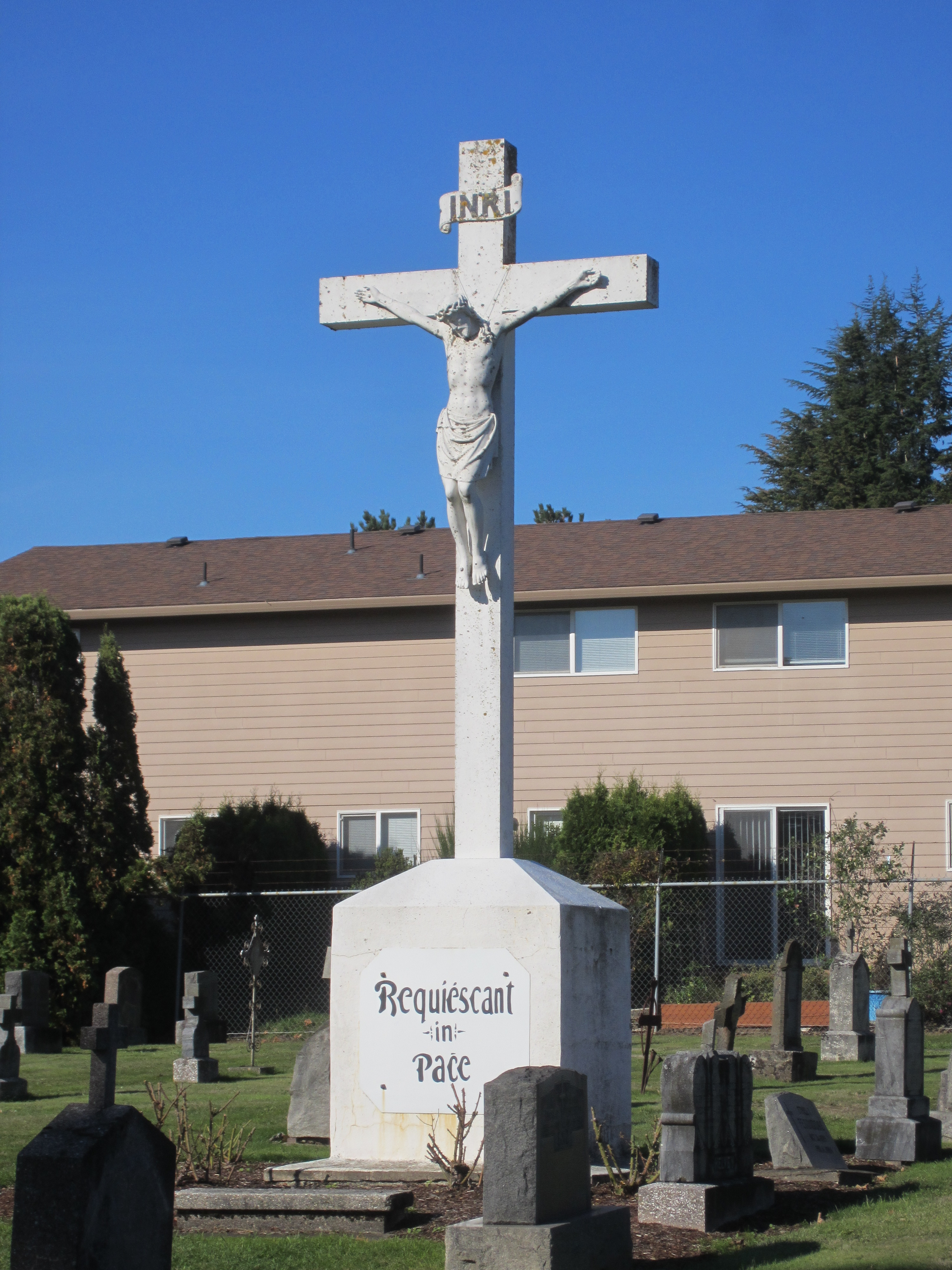
