= White Birch Cemetery =

Cemetery in Gresham, Oregon, U.S.

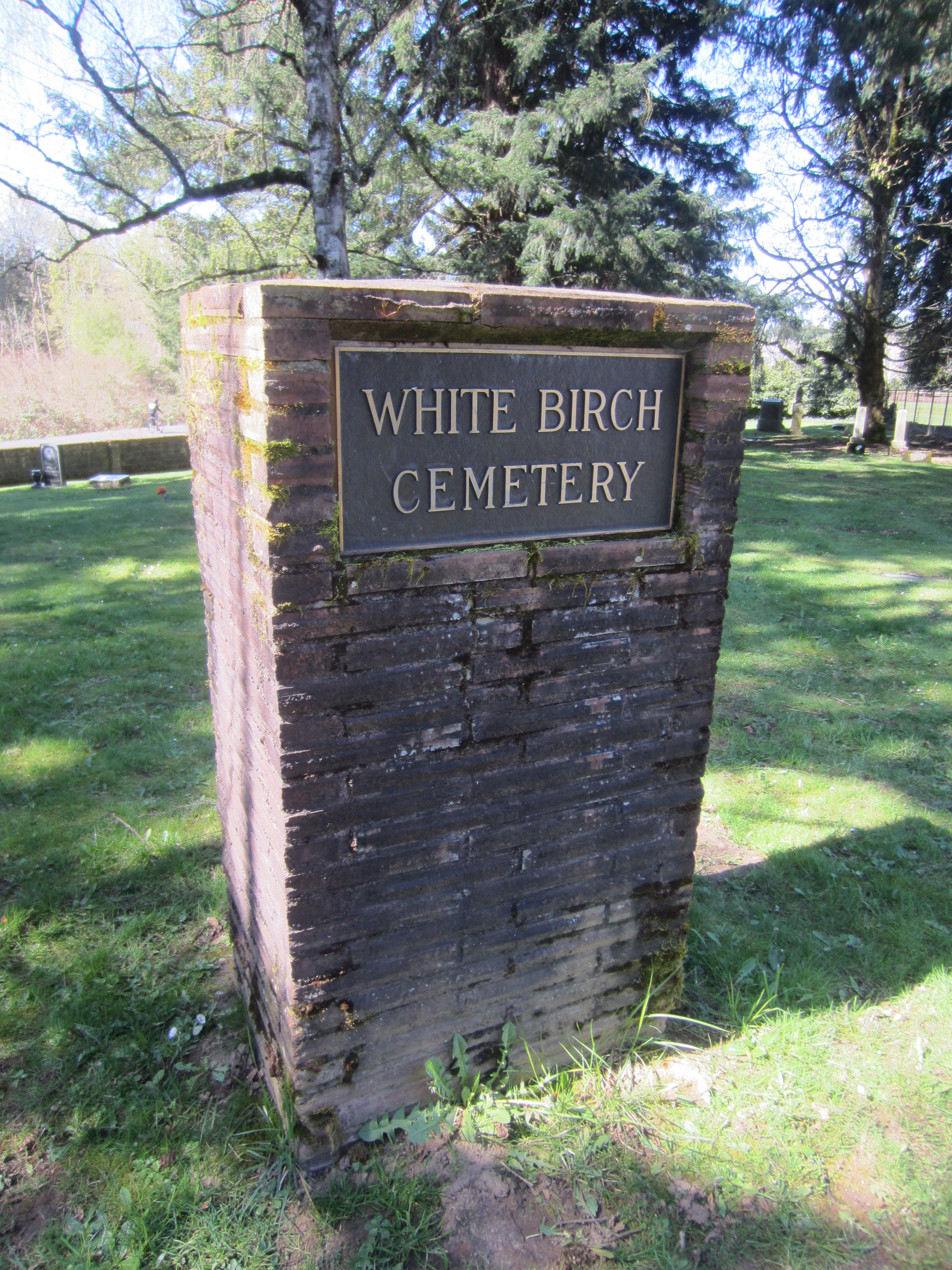

Details
- Location: Gresham, Oregon
- Country: United States
- Coordinates: 45°29′45.5″N 122°26′6″W
- Find a Grave: White Birch Cemetery

White Birch Cemetery is a cemetery in Gresham, Oregon, established in 1889.

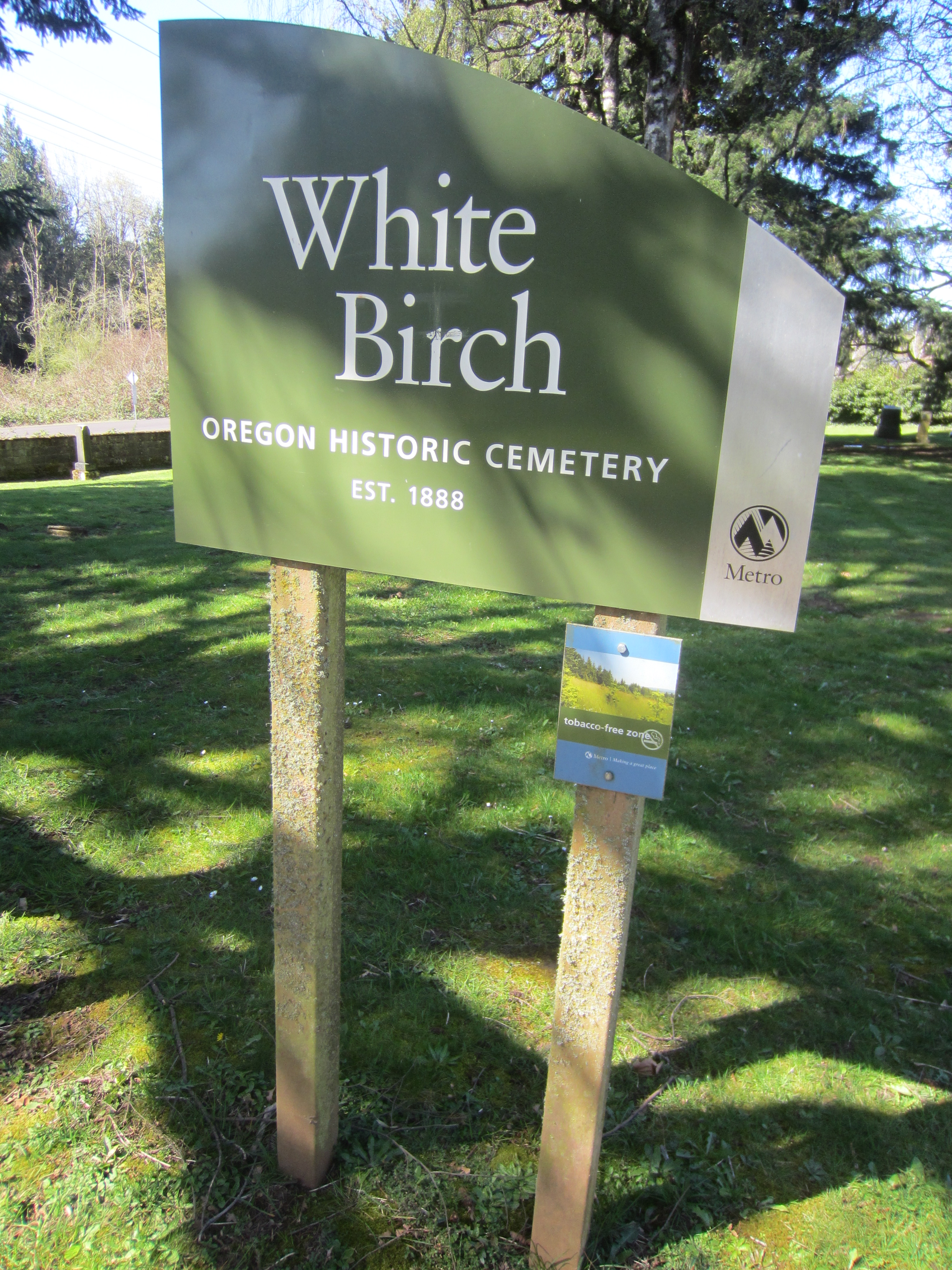

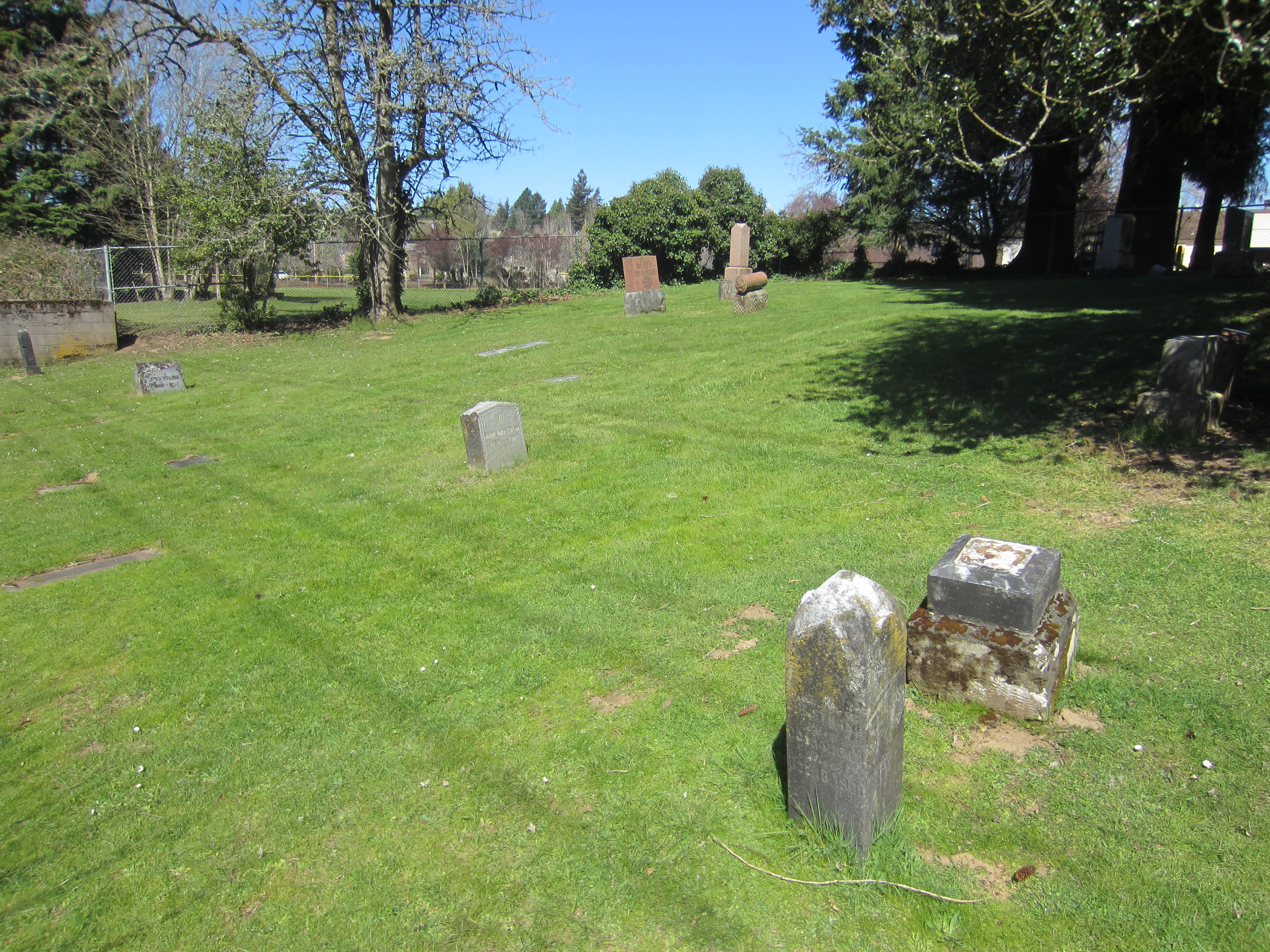

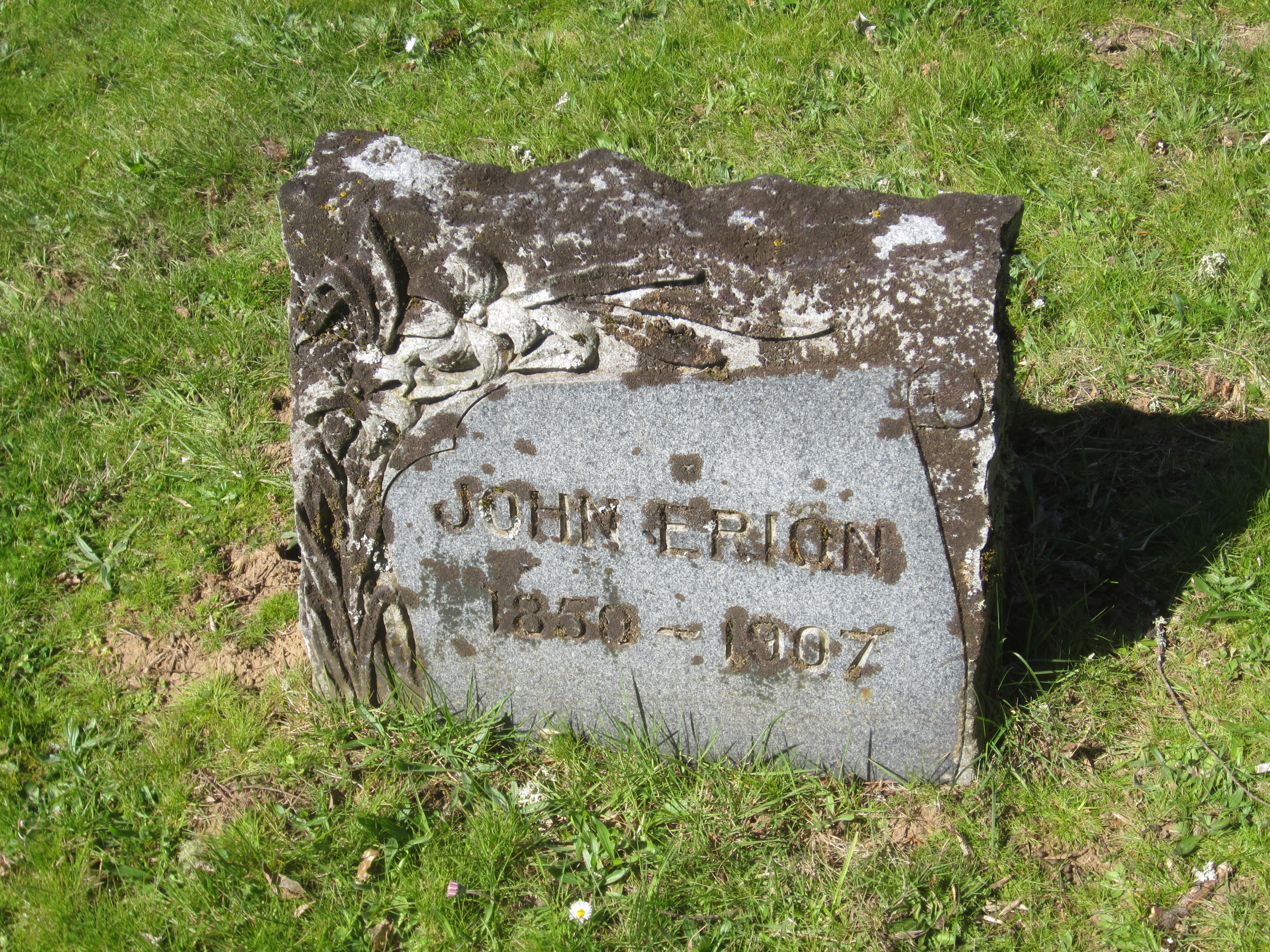

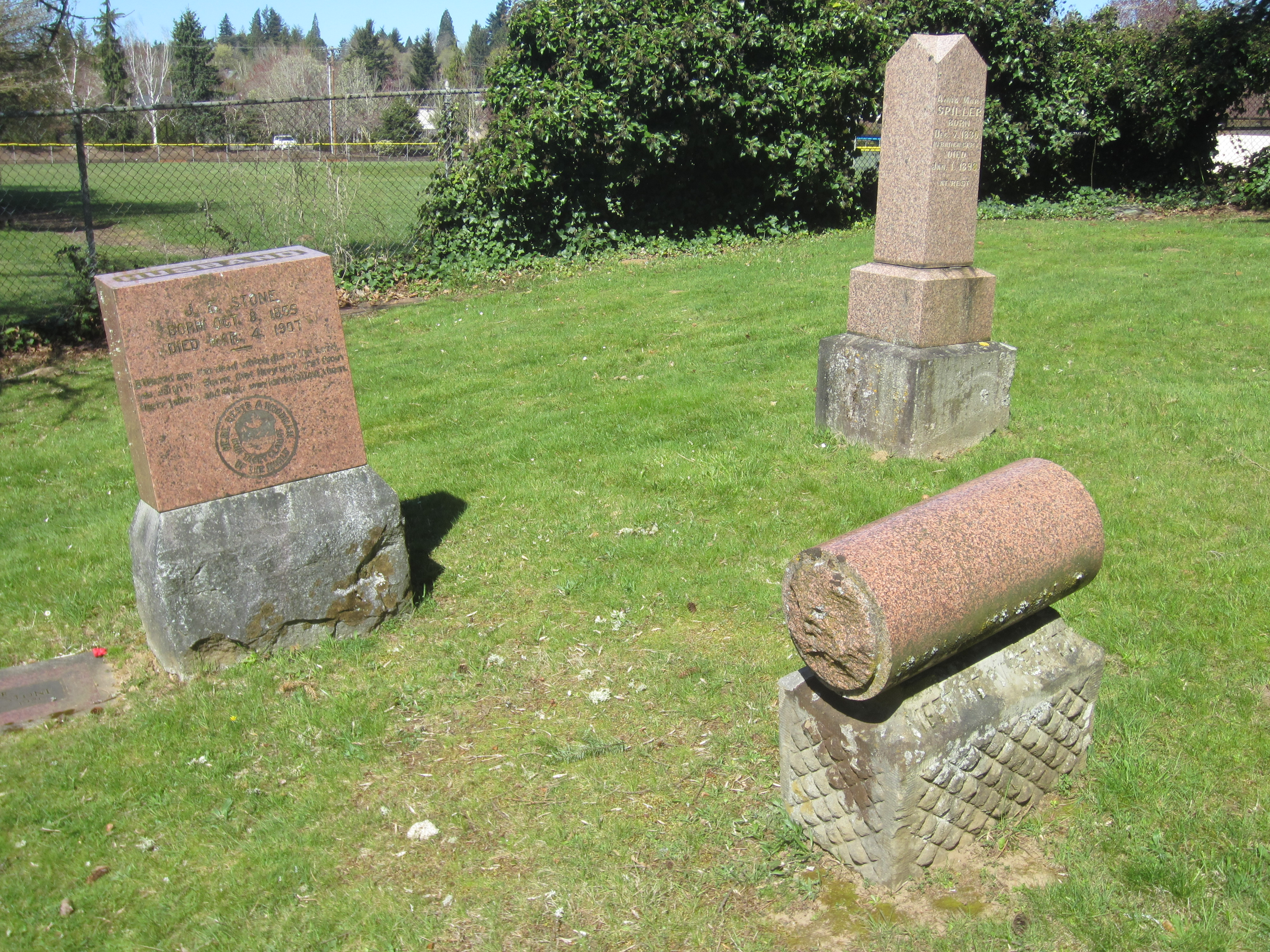

== See also ==
- Escobar Cemetery
- Gresham Pioneer Cemetery
