= List of cemeteries in California =

This list of cemeteries in California includes currently operating, historical (closed for new interments), and defunct (graves abandoned or removed) cemeteries, columbaria, and mausolea which are historical and/or notable. It does not include pet cemeteries.

== Alameda County ==
- Cathedral of Christ the Light Mausoleum, Oakland
- Cedar Lawn Memorial Park, Fremont
- Centerville Pioneer Cemetery (also known as Centerville Presbyterian Cemetery), Fremont
- Chapel of Memories Columbarium, Oakland
- Chapel of the Chimes, Hayward
- Chapel of the Chimes, Oakland
- Dominican Sisters of Mission San Jose Cemetery, Fremont
- Dublin Pioneer Cemetery, Dublin
- Evergreen Cemetery, Oakland
- Holy Sepulchre Cemetery, Hayward
- Lone Tree Cemetery, Fairview
- Mount Eden Cemetery, Hayward
- Mountain View Cemetery, Oakland
- Pleasanton Memorial Gardens Cemetery, also known as IOOF Cemetery, Pleasanton Pioneer Cemetery, Pleasanton
- Roselawn Cemetery, Livermore, also known as Masonic Cemetery
- San Lorenzo Pioneer Memorial Park, also known as San Lorenzo Pioneer Cemetery, San Lorenzo (managed by the Hayward Area Historical Society)
- Saint Augustines Cemetery, Pleasanton
- Saint Mary Cemetery, Oakland

== Amador County ==
- Jackson Pioneer Jewish Cemetery, Jackson

== Calaveras County ==
- Mokelumne Hill Pioneer Jewish Cemetery, Mokelumne Hill
- Pioneer Cemetery (San Andreas, California)

== Contra Costa County ==
- Oakmont Memorial Park, Pleasant Hill
- Rolling Hills Memorial Park, Richmond
- Rose Hill Cemetery, Antioch; part of the Black Diamond Mines Regional Preserve

== El Dorado County ==
- Placerville Pioneer Jewish Cemetery, Placerville
- Placerville Union Cemetery, Placerville

== Fresno County ==
- Ararat Cemetery, Fresno
- Belmont Memorial Park, Fresno
- Mountain View Cemetery, Fresno

== Humboldt County ==
- Sunset Memorial Park, Eureka
- Greenwood Cemetery, Arcata

== Inyo County ==
- Manzanar Cemetery, Manzanar

== Kern County ==
- Bakersfield National Cemetery, Arvin

== Lake County ==
- Lower Lake Cemetery, Lower Lake

== Lassen County ==
- Lassen Cemetery, Susanville (also known as Lassen County Cemetery; and as Susanville New Cemetery)
- Susanville Cemetery, Susanville (closed since 1918, although nearly 100 additional burials occurred since then)

== Los Angeles County ==
- All Souls Cemetery (Long Beach, California)
- Angeles Abbey Memorial Park, Compton
- Angelus-Rosedale Cemetery, Los Angeles
- Artesia Cemetery, Cerritos
- Calvary Cemetery, East Los Angeles
- Cathedral of Our Lady of the Angels Mausoleum, Downtown Los Angeles
- Chapel of the Pines Crematory, Los Angeles
- Chinese Cemetery of Los Angeles, East Los Angeles
- Eden Memorial Park Cemetery, Mission Hills, Los Angeles
- El Campo Santo Cemetery, City of Industry
- Evergreen Cemetery, Los Angeles
- First Jewish site in Los Angeles
- Forest Lawn Memorial-Parks & Mortuaries
  - Forest Lawn Memorial Park Cemetery, Glendale
  - Forest Lawn, Hollywood Hills Cemetery, Los Angeles
  - Forest Lawn Memorial Park, Long Beach
- Grand View Memorial Park Cemetery, Glendale
- Green Hills Memorial Park, Rancho Palos Verdes
- Hillside Memorial Park Cemetery, Culver City
- Hollywood Forever Cemetery, Hollywood
- Holy Cross Cemetery, Culver City
- Home of Peace Cemetery, East Los Angeles
- Inglewood Park Cemetery, Inglewood
- Joshua Memorial Park, Lancaster
- Lincoln Memorial Park Cemetery, Carson
- Long Beach Municipal Cemetery, Signal Hill
- Los Angeles National Cemetery, West Los Angeles
- Mission San Gabriel Arcángel Cemetery, Long Beach
- Mount Sinai Memorial Park Cemetery, Hollywood Hills, Los Angeles
- Mount Zion Cemetery, East Los Angeles
- Oak Park Cemetery, Claremont
- Oakwood Memorial Park Cemetery, Chatsworth
- Odd Fellows Cemetery, Los Angeles
- Portal of the Folded Wings Shrine to Aviation, North Hollywood, Los Angeles
- Rose Hills Memorial Park, Whittier
- San Fernando Mission Cemetery, Mission Hills
- San Fernando Pioneer Memorial Cemetery
- Savannah Memorial Park, Rosemead, California
- Sierra Madre Pioneer Cemetery, Sierra Madre
- Spadra Cemetery, Pomona
- Sunnyside Cemetery, Long Beach
- Valhalla Memorial Park Cemetery, North Hollywood
- Valley Oaks Memorial Park, Westlake Village
- Verdugo Hills Cemetery, Tujunga, Los Angeles
- Westwood Village Memorial Park Cemetery, Westwood
- Woodlawn Memorial Park, Compton
- Woodlawn Memorial Cemetery, Santa Monica

== Mariposa County ==
- St. Joseph Catholic Church, Rectory and Cemetery, Mariposa
- Yosemite Cemetery, Yosemite Village

== Marin County ==
- Mount Olivet Catholic Cemetery, San Rafael
- Mount Tamalpais Cemetery, San Rafael
- Tomales Presbyterian Church and Cemetery, Tomales

== Monterey County ==
- Mission San Carlos Borromeo de Carmelo, Carmel-by-the-Sea, California
- San Carlos Cemetery (Monterey, California)

== Napa County ==
- St. Helena Public Cemetery, St. Helena
- Tulocay Cemetery, Napa

== Nevada County ==
- Grass Valley Pioneer Jewish Cemetery (or Shaar Zedek), Grass Valley
- Nevada City Jewish Cemetery, Nevada City
- Pioneer Cemetery (Nevada City, California)
- Red Dog Cemetery, Red Dog, California.

== Orange County ==
- Anaheim Cemetery, Anaheim
- Christ Cathedral Memorial Gardens, Garden Grove
- Fairhaven Memorial Park, Santa Ana
- Mission San Juan Capistrano Cemetery, San Juan Capistrano
- Pacific View Memorial Park, Corona del Mar
- Yorba Cemetery, Yorba Linda

== Placer County ==
- Colfax District Cemetery, Colfax
- Rocklin Cemetery, Rocklin

== Plumas County ==
- Big Flat Cemetery, Seneca
- Taylorsville Cemetery, Taylorsville
- Whispering Pines Cemetery, Beckwourth

== Sacramento County ==
- Chevra Kaddisha Cemetery, Sacramento; listed as a California Historical Landmark, first Jewish cemetery in the state (now defunct).
- Chung Wah Cemetery, Folsom; on the National Register of Historic Places
- East Lawn Memorial Park, East Sacramento
- Folsom Prison Burial Grounds Cemetery, Folsom
- Home of Peace Cemetery, Sacramento
- New Helvetia Cemetery, East Sacramento; first cemetery in the city (operated 1845 to 1912)
- Sacramento Historic City Cemetery, Sacramento; also known as "Old City Cemetery"
- Sunset Lawn Chapel of the Chimes, Sacramento

== San Francisco County ==
- Golden Gate Cemetery (San Francisco), defunct city-owned cemetery
- Grace Cathedral Columbarium
- Lone Mountain Cemetery, defunct cemetery complex that included Laurel Hill Cemetery, Calvary Cemetery, Masonic Cemetery, and Odd Fellows Cemetery
- San Francisco Columbarium & Funeral Home
- San Francisco National Cemetery
- San Francisco Marine Hospital, was a former psychiatric hospital (operated from 1875 to 1912) with an adjacent cemetery, some of the graves are still visible as of 2006.
- West Coast Memorial to the Missing of World War II

== San Joaquin County ==
- Cherokee Memorial Park and Funeral Home, Lodi
- Stockton State Hospital Cemetery, Stockton
- San Joaquin Catholic Cemetery, Stockton
- Woodbridge Masonic Cemetery, Woodbridge

== San Luis Obispo County ==
- Old Santa Rosa Catholic Church and Cemetery, Cambria

== San Mateo County ==
- Cypress Lawn Memorial Park, Colma
- Golden Gate National Cemetery, San Bruno
- Greenlawn Memorial Park, Colma
- Hills of Eternity Memorial Park, Colma
- Holy Cross Cemetery, Colma
- Holy Cross Cemetery, Menlo Park
- Home of Peace Cemetery, Colma
- The Italian Cemetery, Colma
- Japanese Cemetery, Colma
- Olivet Gardens of Cypress Lawn Memorial Park, Colma
- Salem Memorial Park, Colma
- Skylawn Memorial Park, San Mateo
- Union Cemetery, Redwood City, on the National Register of Historic Places
- Woodlawn Memorial Park Cemetery, Colma

== Santa Barbara County ==
- Santa Barbara Cemetery, Santa Barbara

== Santa Clara County ==
- Alta Mesa Memorial Park, Palo Alto
- Stanford Mausoleum, Stanford University
- Mission City Memorial Park, Santa Clara
- Santa Clara Mission Cemetery, Santa Clara
- Calvary Catholic Cemetery, San Jose
- Oak Hill Memorial Park, San Jose

== Santa Cruz County ==
- Evergreen Cemetery (Santa Cruz, California)
- Oakwood Memorial Park (Santa Cruz, California)
- Santa Cruz Memorial Park, Santa Cruz
- Home of Peace Cemetery (Santa Cruz, California)

== Shasta County ==
- Jewish Cemetery, Shasta

== Solano County ==
- Sacramento Valley National Cemetery, near Dixon

== Stanislaus County ==
- Valley Home Memorial Park, Oakdale

== Sutter County ==
- Sutter Cemetery, Sutter

== Trinity County ==
- Lewiston Pioneer Cemetery in Lewiston Historic District, Lewiston; NRHP-listed

== Tulare County ==
- Tulare Public Cemetery, Tulare
- Smith Mountain Cemetery (Alta Cemetery District), Dinuba

== Tuolumne County ==
- Sonora Hebrew Cemetery, Sonora

== Ventura County ==
- Bardsdale Cemetery, Bardsdale
- Conejo Mountain Funeral Home, Memorial Park and Crematory, Camarillo
- Hueneme Masonic Cemetery, Oxnard
- Mount Sinai Simi Valley, Simi Valley
- Nordhoff Cemetery, Ojai
- Oxnard Japanese Cemetery, Oxnard
- Ronald Reagan Presidential Library, Simi Valley
- Santa Paula Cemetery, Santa Paula
- Simi Valley Public Cemetery, includes El Rancho Simi Pioneer Cemetery, Simi Valley

== Yolo County ==
- Davis Cemetery and Arboretum, Davis

== Yuba County ==
- Marysville Cemetery, Marysville
- Marysville Hebrew Cemetery, Marysville

== See also ==
- List of cemeteries in the United States
- Pioneer cemetery
