= Forest Lawn Memorial Park (Long Beach) =

Cemetery in Long Beach, California

Coordinates: 33.8429°N 118.1692°W

- Interactive map of Forest Lawn Memorial Park

Details
- Established: c. 1921
- Location: 1500 East San Antonio Drive, Long Beach, Los Angeles County, California, U.S.
- Owned by: Forest Lawn Memorial-Parks & Mortuaries
- Website: https://forestlawn.com/parks/long-beach/
- Find a Grave: Forest Lawn Memorial Park

Forest Lawn-Long Beach is a 38-acre funeral home and memorial garden in Long Beach, California, United States. The gardens were established as Sunnyside Memorial Gardens in 1921 by Cecil E. Bryan, Sr., an entrepreneur whose family operated the facility for three generations. Sunnyside was one of the first major cemeteries in Long Beach. Over the years it served the local area, but fell into disrepair by the 1970s. and was purchased in 1978 by Forest Lawn Memorial-Parks & Mortuaries. They renovated the facility, and renamed it Forest Lawn – Sunnyside in deference to its history—it was later changed to Forest Lawn – Long Beach to match their other properties.

The park was built with Spanish Colonial architecture, and has a number of noticeable features. The prominent Spanish Renaissance-style Cathedral Tower was designed by the Bryan family and the architect Clarence L. Jay, and has been a landmark since its construction in 1924–1925. There are elaborately designed doorways and arches, large Spanish windows in art glass, imported marbles, and tiling. Long Beach resident Frank Julious Fisher created the intricate stencils and woodcarvings tracing the walls of the mausoleum. The marble was done by Lohr Marble Company in Pasadena, and restored by them in 1978. This was the first mausoleum to be equipped with Deagan tower chimes and pipe organ, and the only one with an echo organ in conjunction with its regular pipe organ.

The Memorial Chapel, in adobe and red tile architecture, also reflects early California's Spanish and Mexican lineage. Created by Benjamin Mako and his team of artists, the stained glass windows display California history from 1769 to 1909. Beyond the stained glass window there is a carved reredos leading toward the mural interpretation of The Ascension of Christ, created by R. Brownell McGrew.

The Rotunda contains the statue of the mythological figure Danae; the statue hall features busts of Constantine the Great, Charlemagne, St. Augustine, Dante Alighieri, Desiderius Erasmus, William Tyndale, John Knox, John Milton, Thomas Jefferson and Ralph Waldo Emerson. There is also a “Paradise” mosaic, a rendition of Raphael's fresco, and a Foucault pendulum, one of eight in Southern California.

== Notable interments ==
- Art Chapman, ice hockey player
- Ed Roebuck, baseball player
- Edward Killingsworth, architect
- Frank Merriam, politician
- Frank Sully, actor
- James Hilton, novelist
- Ken Block, Rally Driver
- Luana Patten, actress
- Nate Dogg, rapper
- Rickie Sorensen, actor
- Ricky Harris, actor
- Thomas M. Eaton, congressman
- Vera Steadman, actress
- Vern Stephens, baseball player
- William Ward Johnson, congressman

== See also ==
- Long Beach Municipal Cemetery
- Sunnyside Cemetery
