= Rocklin Cemetery =

- Interactive map of Rocklin Cemetery

Details
- Location: 4090 Kannasto Street, Rocklin, California
- Country: United States
- Coordinates: 38.78226°N 121.23447°W
- Type: public
- Size: 28 acres (11 ha)
- No. of graves: approximately 4,500
- Find a Grave: Rocklin Cemetery

Rocklin Cemetery is a historic public cemetery, located at 4090 Kannasto Street in Rocklin, Placer County, California, United States.

== History ==
Rocklin Cemetery's early history is unknown. However, there are two theories; its first burial around 1850, during the Gold Rush-era community of Secret Ravine or alternatively its first burial was in 1864 when a missing railroad worker was found dead. From 1893 to 1903, the Ruhkala family quarry (founded by Finnish immigrant Matt Ruhkala), made granite monuments, building materials and gravestones and was located adjacent of the cemetery and was later moved nearby.

In 1889, the Masons and Oddfellows Lodge acquired the cemetery. Since 1929, Rocklin Cemetery has been operated as a public cemetery.

== Notable burials ==
- Matt Ruhkala (1869–1945)

== See also ==
- List of cemeteries in California
