= Ernest Bankey =

Ernest Edward Bankey Jr.
- Born: August 28, 1920; Cleveland, Ohio, U.S.
- Died: June 10, 2009 (aged 88); Newbury Park, California, U.S.
- Burial place: Conejo Mountain Memorial Park
- Military career
- Allegiance: United States
- Branch: United States Army Air Corps; United States Army Air Forces; United States Air Force Reserve; United States Air Force
- Service years: 1941–1968
- Rank: Colonel
- Conflicts: World War II: Battle of the Bulge
- Awards: Distinguished Service Cross; Silver Star; Distinguished Flying Cross (2); Air Medal (10); Croix de guerre (France)
- Other work: Jet Propulsion Laboratory

Ernest Edward Bankey Jr. (August 28, 1920 – June 10, 2009) was an American World War II flying ace credited with 9.5 aerial victories. He was also an ace in a day, and rose to the rank of colonel in the United States Air Force.

== Early life ==
Bankey was born on August 28, 1920, in Cleveland, Ohio, and was raised in Toledo, Ohio. It was during his youth that he began his interest in planes. He began building model planes from the age of eight. He also won the Soap Box Derby twice, in 1935 and 1936.

== Military career ==
Bankey joined the Army Air Corps at Fort Hayes, Columbus, Ohio, on April 1, 1941.

As a staff sergeant, he taught aerial gunnery techniques in Las Vegas, while awaiting acceptance into Air Cadet School to start pilot training. In July 1943, Bankey gained his commission and pilot wings as part of class 43G at Williams Air Force Base, Arizona. He did his preliminary training in a Stearman PT-13 at Tulare, California, his basic training in a BT-13 Valiant in Modesto, California and advanced training in a T-6 Texan in Phoenix, Arizona.

He joined the 383rd Fighter Squadron as a second lieutenant. His first combat posting was to England with the 364th Fighter Group, 8th Air Force, in February 1944. He was reassigned to the 385th Fighter Squadron.

On December 27, 1944, during the Battle of the Bulge and whilst flying over the Bonn area of Germany, Bankey shot down five enemy planes and shared another. This earned him the designation of "ace in a day". He was also awarded the Distinguished Service Cross and the Distinguished Unit Citation for this sortie. He compiled over 100 sorties and 500 combat hours in two tours of duty. Banks is credited with 9.5 air-to-air kills.

After the war, he returned to the United States, left active duty and joined the Air Force Reserve on April 18, 1946. Bankey was recalled to active duty beginning on March 15, 1953, and then completed Pilot Refresher Training at Graham AB, Florida, followed by Instructor Pilot School at Craig AFB, Alabama.

Bankey served as an instructor pilot and operations officer before serving at the U.S. Air Forces in Europe Weapons Center from July 1957 to September 1958. His next assignment was as a Guided Missile Operations Officer with the 576th Strategic Missile Squadron at Vandenberg AFB, California, from September 1958 to June 1960, followed by service on the staff of Headquarters 1st Missile Division (renamed 1st Strategic Aerospace Division in July 1961) at Vandenberg from June 1960 to April 1963.

His next assignment was as a Missile Test Evaluation Officer with Headquarters Strategic Air Command at Offutt AFB, Nebraska, from April 1963 to November 1966. Col Bankey's final assignment was as Deputy Chief and then Chief of the Evaluation and Capabilities Division with the 3902nd Support Squadron at Offutt AFB from November 1966 until his retirement from the Air Force on March 1, 1968.

== Awards and decorations ==
During his lengthy career, Bankey earned many decorations, including:

Command pilot badge
Distinguished Service Cross
Silver Star
Distinguished Flying Cross with one oak leaf cluster
Air Medal with one silver leaf and three oak leaf clusters
Air Medal (second ribbon required for accouterment spacing)
Air Force Commendation Medal with one oak leaf cluster
Army Good Conduct Medal
American Defense Service Medal
American Campaign Medal
European-African-Middle Eastern Campaign Medal with two bronze service stars
World War II Victory Medal
Army of Occupation Medal

Air Force Longevity Service Award with four oak leaf clusters

Armed Forces Reserve Medal

Small Arms Expert Marksmanship Ribbon

Croix de Guerre with Palm (France)

Bankey was a captain when, on June 26, 1945, he was awarded the Silver Star for actions during World War II. The citation reads:

The President of the United States of America, authorized by Act of Congress, July 9, 1918, takes pleasure in presenting the Silver Star to Captain (Air Corps) Ernest E. Bankey, Jr. (ASN: 0-752095), United States Army Air Forces, for gallantry in action against the enemy while serving as Pilot of a P-51 fighter airplane of the 364th Fighter Group, EIGHTH Air Force, on 16 April 1945. Having furnished fighter escort to a target in Germany, Captain Bankey, with his Squadron, proceeded to an enemy airdrome according to plan. In the face of intense ground fire, he made six sweeps across the field, destroying four and damaging four enemy aircraft on the ground. Realizing that his plane had sustained numerous hits and that he was now alone, he withdrew and set a course for base. On the return journey he observed another airfield and made futile attempts to contact he group leader. Although only two of his guns were operational, he circled the field and as three fighters took off, made a daring attack. Expending the last of his ammunition, he scored strikes on two of the planes which crashed and exploded. Captain Bankey's boldness, disregard for personal safety, and fearless initiative during this action attest to his determination to destroy the enemy at any cost.

== Final years ==
After retirement from the Air Force, Bankley joined the Jet Propulsion Laboratories in California. There he worked on deep space projects. He retired in 1975.

Bankey died on June 15, 2009, in his home in Newbury Park, California. He was buried with full military honors in Conejo Mountain Memorial Park in Camarillo, California.

== Personal life ==
Bankey married Lillian Ruth "Ginny" Kontak on May 2, 1942, in Bowling Green, Ohio. They had four children: sons Dan and Keith, and daughters Sharon and Tina. Bankey has eight grandchildren and seven great-grandchildren. His wife Ginny, died on July 16, 2009; she was in-urned next to her husband.
