= Hua Siong College of Iloilo =

Private Chinese college in Iloilo City, Philippines

- Dalubhasaang Hua Siong ng Iloilo (Filipino); Chinese (Traditional): 怡朗華商學院
- Realm of the Red Phoenix, Birthplace of Excellence, Home of the Champions
- Former names: Iloilo Chinese Vocational School (1912–1927); Iloilo Chinese Primary Commercial School (1927–2013); Iloilo Chinese Commercial High School
- Motto: Diligence, Sincerity, Loyalty, Courage; Philippine Hokkien ( Pe̍h-ōe-jī): 勤(Khûn)、誠(Sêng)、忠(Tiong)、勇(Ióng)
- Type: Private nonsectarian, Coeducational basic and higher education institution
- Established: February 25, 1912; 114 years ago
- Founder: Filipino Chinese Chamber of Commerce of Iloilo
- Chairman: Ian Eric Pama
- President: Robert Uy Po
- Principal: Jose B. Barcelona (Principal - English Dept.) Marivic Parcon (Principal - Chinese Dept.)
- Location: Iznart St., Brgy. Ed Ganzon Iloilo City, Iloilo, Philippines; 10°41′49″N 122°34′08″E
- Campus: *Main Campus: Iznart St., Iloilo City; Satellite Campus: Ledesco Village, La Paz, Iloilo City
- Nicknames: Hua Siong, HSCI
- Sporting affiliations: ILOPRISAA; Milo-SBP ISSA
- Mascot: Red Phoenix
- Website: www.huasiong.edu.ph
- Location in the Visayas Location in the Philippines

Hua Siong College of Iloilo or HSCI (simplified Chinese: 怡朗华商学院; traditional Chinese: 怡朗華商學院; pinyin: Yílǎng Huá Shāng Xuéyuàn; Pe̍h-ōe-jī: Î-lóng Hoâ-siong Ha̍k-īⁿ), commonly referred to as Hua Siong, is a private college located Iloilo City, Philippines. Founded by the Filipino Chinese Chamber of Commerce of Iloilo as a preparatory school in 1912, it is the first Chinese school outside of Manila (second in the Philippines).

Hua Siong offers academic courses from basic education all the way up to tertiary levels in the programs of business and information and computing sciences.

The education system of the school is based mainly in Mandarin, Filipino English languages. Hua Siong has two campuses: the main campus on Calle Iznart (City Proper), and Ledesco Village in La Paz, Iloilo City.

== History ==
Hua Siong College of Iloilo is the second-oldest Filipino-Chinese school in the Philippines, founded in 1912 by the Iloilo Chinese Chamber of Commerce. Originally named Iloilo Chinese Vocational School, it was located in the Yu Tiak Ha Building on Aldeguer Street in . A year later, the school was renamed Iloilo Chinese Primary Commercial School with 60 students.

In 1918, the Chamber of Commerce acquired a piece of land along Iznart Street. By 1927, the school was called Primary Commercial School and later became Iloilo Chinese Commercial High School.

In 1932, more classrooms were implemented, instructional materials and equipment were provided, new curricula in the Elementary and High School were offered, and a Kindergarten course was also introduced to the college.

=== During World War II ===
During the Japanese occupation of the Philippine in World War II, among those who stood up against the Japanese in Iloilo City were the school teachers and students, who formed anti-Japanese Patriotic Groups. The group encouraged the local Chinese community by staging drama performances. Being the leading member of the Anti-Japanese Forum, constituted principally by the local Chinese, school teachers frequently organized discussions on current events.

When Japanese aggressors reached Iloilo, some of the anti-Japanese organizers, including members of the board of trustees, were reportedly detained, tortured and executed. Their remains were buried in a Chinese Cemetery.

The war left the school in ruins. The board of trustees secured financial support from residents of Gigante Island, who assisted in rebuilding the school. Classes reopened in November 1949 in temporary nipa hut classrooms. Later, a new school building, Yu Guang Lou (Fisherman Hall), was inaugurated, named in honor of the Gigante fishermen and residents who contributed to its construction.

=== Restoration ===
In 1950, “Yee Bin Lou” (Iloilo Shore Hall) was established and the following year, “Min Chiang Lou” (Manila River Hall) was inaugurated. The halls were named after contributors regions.

In December 1952, many Chinese teachers were detained and even mass deported across the country, as they were suspected to be communists. By 1955, after courses in Chinese Senior High School reintroduced, HSCI became a fully-pledged high school in 1958 where the first Senior High School and second Batch of English Secondary students graduated simultaneously.

=== The fire ===
On 7 February 1966, a large fire struck Iloilo City Proper – the biggest Iloilo had experienced. Almost one-third of the commercial districts of the city were burned to the ground. HSCI was burnt down. To continue the study of the 900 students, the board of trustees decided on the resumption of classes a few days after the fire.

The school was transferred to a rented building in Guanco Street. The board of trustees, the Iloilo Chinese Chamber of Commerce, and the school formed a School Fund Drive Committee. The Overseas Chinese Daily Publications Corporation quartered in Manila offered to help in the fund drive.

The construction of the first school building started in July 1967, was completed in May 1968, and put into use in June of the same year.

=== Recent events ===
In 1975, HSCI was recognized under the name of Iloilo Central Commercial High School or ICCHS. During this time, enrollees increased to 1800. Because of the rapid increase of population, two more buildings were built. The Cho Tiak Hall and the Po Kim Bee Hall were renovated in 1984.

HSCI was awarded as the Grand Slam Champion in basketball.

The Alumni Association sponsored a “Light for Progress” movement- rallying alumni, parents and friends from all walks of life throughout the country to raise funds for the procurement of an adjacent lot (with an area of 1,225 square metres (13,190 sq ft)) upon which a beautiful Alumni Park and a modernized Kindergarten Department were constructed. These facilities were turned over to the school during its 75th Foundation Day.

In 1992 the Board of Trustees began construction of a school building adjoining the Antonio Uy Si Kai stage. The new five-storey building houses the school canteen in the ground floor, which sells books and other school materials and snacks. The ten classrooms at each level answered the perennial problem of the lack of classrooms.

The second floor has a T.H.E. Room on the second floor, a Speech Laboratory and Computer Rooms at the third and fourth level. On the fifth floor is the Alumni Hall with a Conference and Audio-Visual rooms.

As of 1996, the student population had increased to 2,000.

Each year HSCI has participated in activities undertaken by the Department of Education, Culture and Sports, by the private sector and organizations in events like sports, cultural and academic competitions. Graduates in past years have passed 100% in the National Secondary Assessment Test (NSAT).

The school announced the opening of college business courses during the 2013 Chinese New Year Festival of Iloilo. The school will be renamed Hua Siong College of Iloilo, Inc. (HSCI).

== Campuses ==
=== Main campus ===
The Main campus is located in Iznart Street, Iloilo City. The main and original Hua Siong.

=== Ledesco campus ===
The Ledesco campus is located in the Ledesco Villages, being in a subdivision that is distant from the city, most of its students live in the dorm or the surrounding village. Ledesco campus has a parking lot, a swimming pool, two basketball courts, a football field, and a dorm.

== Notable alumni ==
- Jose Mari Chan - famous Ilonggo singer.
- Alfonso A. Uy - first President of Filipino-Chinese Chamber of Commerce from Visayas and Mindanao.
- James Yap - basketball player and celebrity.
- Edgar Sia - Chinese-Japanese-Filipino businessman and founder of Mang Inasal, DoubleDragon Properties, CityMall and MerryMart.
- Angelia Ong - Miss Earth winner.
- Yves Dignadice - PBA Player

Preceded by Philippine Tiong Se Academy; April 15, 1899	Oldest Chinese School in the Philippines; Second; February 25, 1912	Succeeded by Manila Patriotic School; November 11, 1912
