= William Erwin Willmore =

William Erwin Willmore (either 1844 or 1845 – January 16, 1901) was an English-born American headmaster and the founder of a small colony named after him, Willmore City in 1876. This piece of land, roughly 4000 acres, partitioned from the former Los Cerritos ranchero, was bought by Jotham Bixby, who helped found what would initially become the city of Long Beach, California. Willmore City was initially incorporated as a neighbourhood of the city of Long Beach in 1886.

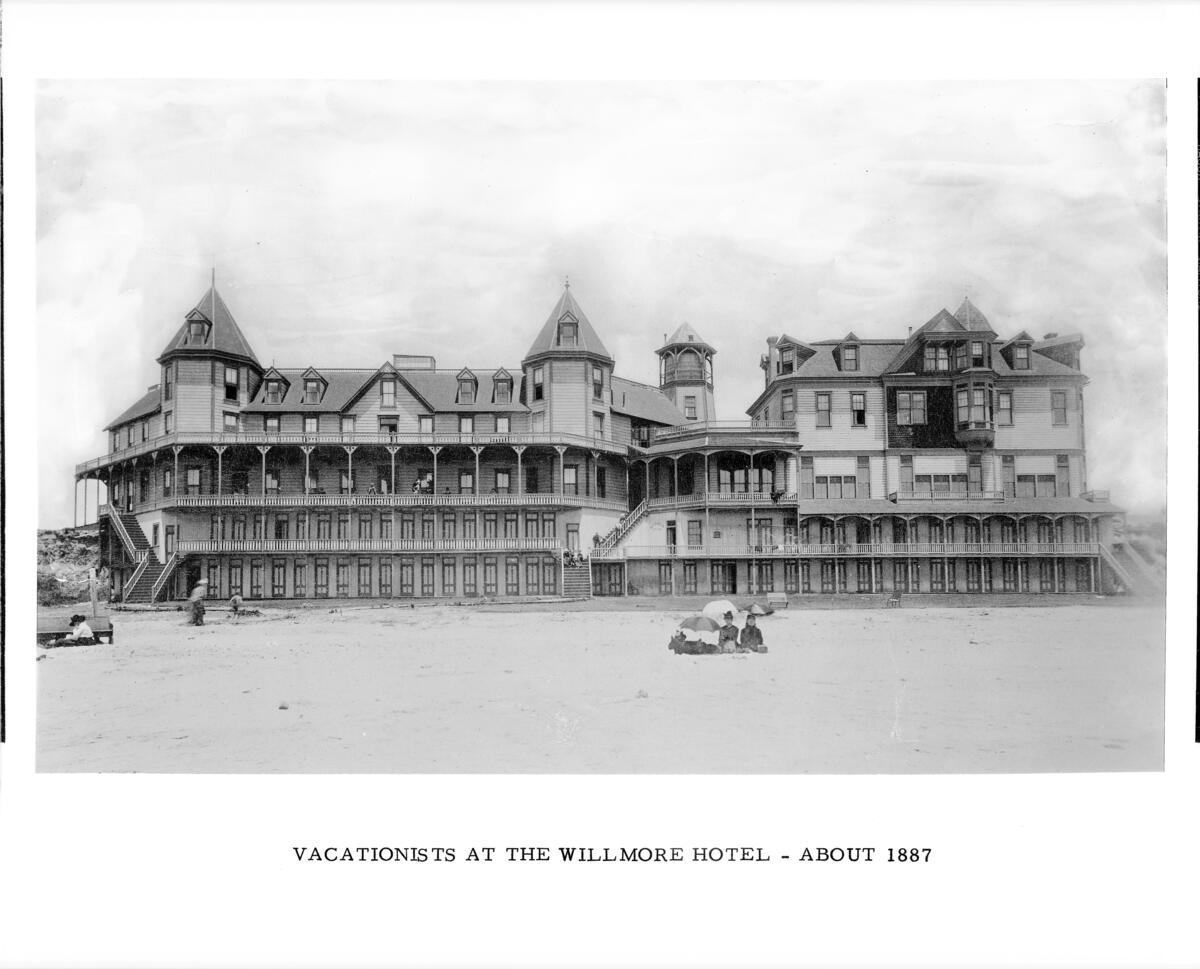
The Willmore Hotel in Long Beach, c. 1887

Mr. Willmore was born in England, supposedly in Sheffield, and moved to California in 1855 after the local magistrate seized his family's estate as a result of a government dispute with estate taxes that were due to the British crown. After several years of diligent planning of his colony, Mr. Willmore became a senior manager of the California Immigrant Union, an organisation founded in 1869 to promote the Willmore City settlement on the partitioned lands of the Los Cerritos ranchero, that was later purchased by Jotham Bixby in Southern California. Mr. Willmore intended to create a thriving farm community on the prime oceanside real estate in Southern California, but his aspirations for expansion to build a city were not realised until after his death. Mr. Willmore died a pauper. William Erwin Willmore is buried at Long Beach Municipal Cemetery, at the northwestern corner of Orange Avenue and Willow Street in the city of Long Beach.
