= California Immigrant Union =

The California Immigrant Union was an organization founded in 1869 to promote the settlement of California by people from the Eastern United States and from Europe.

The boosterism organization appears to have been active through at least 1875.

== See also ==
- 1870s in California−related topics
- William Erwin Willmore
