= Long Beach Municipal Cemetery =

Cemetery in Signal Hill, California

- Interactive map of Long Beach Municipal Cemetery

Details
- Established: c. 1901
- Location: 1151 East Willow Street, Signal Hill, Los Angeles County, California, U.S.
- Coordinates: 33.80447°N 118.17692°W
- Type: Public
- Owned by: City of Long Beach
- Size: 4.3 ha (11 acres)
- Website: Official website
- Find a Grave: Long Beach Municipal Cemetery

Long Beach Municipal Cemetery, is a cemetery established under its current title c. 1901 and located at the northwest corner of Willow Street and Orange Avenue in Signal Hill, California. It was formerly known as Long Beach Signal Hill Cemetery, and as Long Beach Cemetery.

== History ==
It is located next door, and east of Sunnyside Cemetery. It is believed to have been originally established as early as the mid-19th century as a burial ground for employees of the Bixby land companies. Many of the Municipal Cemetery's records were destroyed in a 1936 fire.

== Notable burials ==
Many of the early pioneer families of the city are buried here. Other burials include:

- William Erwin Willmore, founder of Willmore City
- Alexander H. Jones, politician who served as a Congressional Representative from North Carolina
- Milton F. Neece, died 1878, oldest known grave

== See also ==
- List of cemeteries in California
