= Manila Patriotic School =

Private Chinese school in Manila, Philippines

Coordinates: 14°36′11″N 120°58′48″E

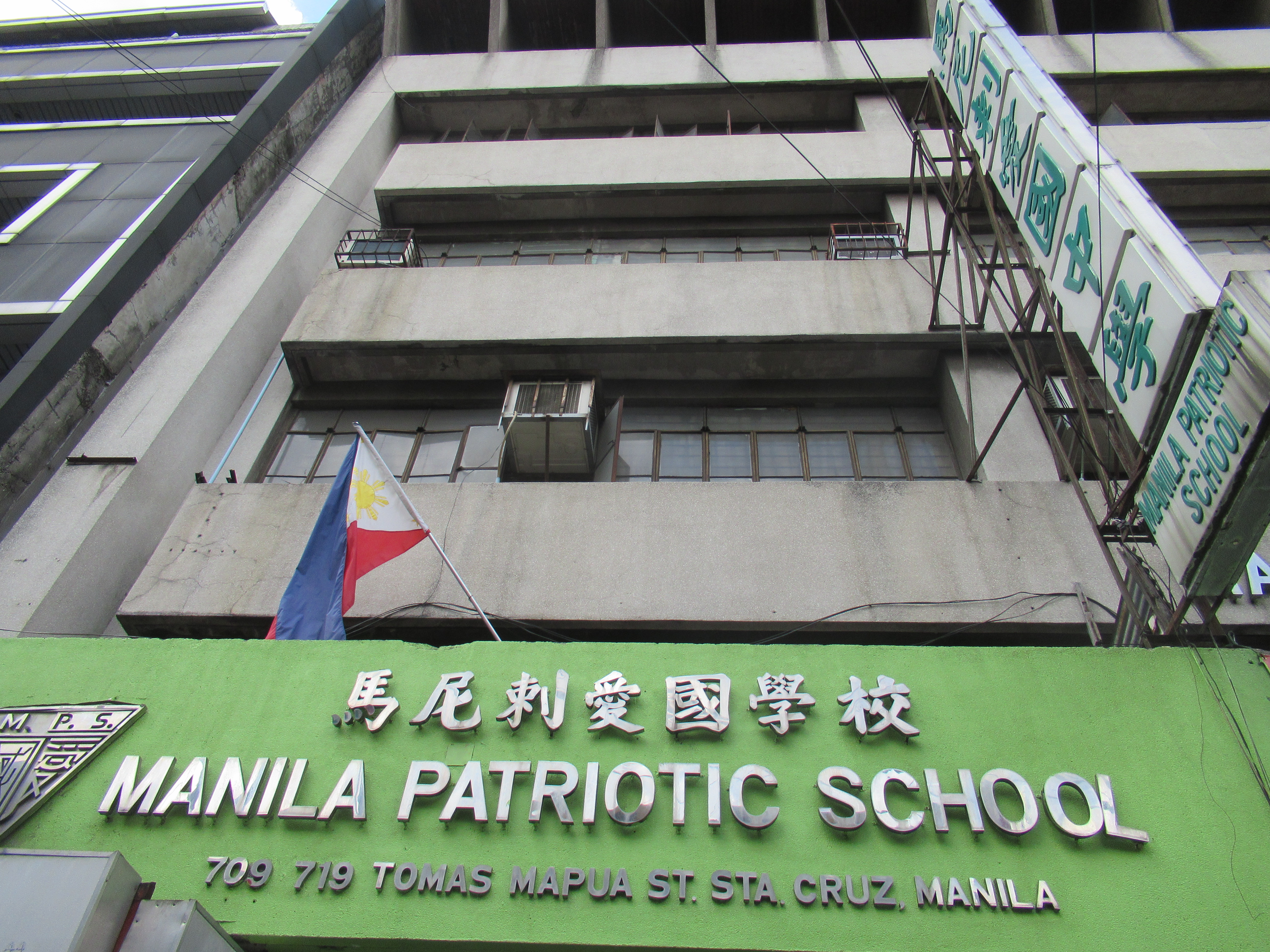

Information
- Established: 1912; 113 years ago

Manila Patriotic School (Chinese: 马尼剌爱国中学) is a Cantonese-established Chinese school that offers Mandarin classes, located in No. 701 T. Mapua Street, Santa Cruz, Manila, Philippines. It was founded in November 1912, and is recognized as second of the oldest Filipino Chinese schools in Binondo, Manila next to Tiong Se Academy. Private, non-sectarian and funded by alumni association of the school. In November 2024, the school celebrate 112th founding Anniversary and third oldest Filipino Chinese school in the Philippines next to Hua Siong College of Iloilo (formerly Iloilo Central Commercial High School). Its sister school is the Baguio Patriotic High School.

| Preceded by Iloilo Central Commercial High School; February 25, 1912 | Oldest Chinese School in the Philippines; Third; November 11, 1912 | Succeeded by San Pablo Chung Hua School; June 1915 |
