= Anaheim Cemetery =

Cemetery in Anaheim, California

Details
- Established: c. 1866
- Location: 1400 East Sycamore Street, Anaheim, Orange County, California, U.S.
- Coordinates: 33.84218°N 117.89915°W
- Type: Public
- Size: 16 acres (6.5 ha)
- No. of graves: Roughly 12,500
- Find a Grave: Anaheim Cemetery

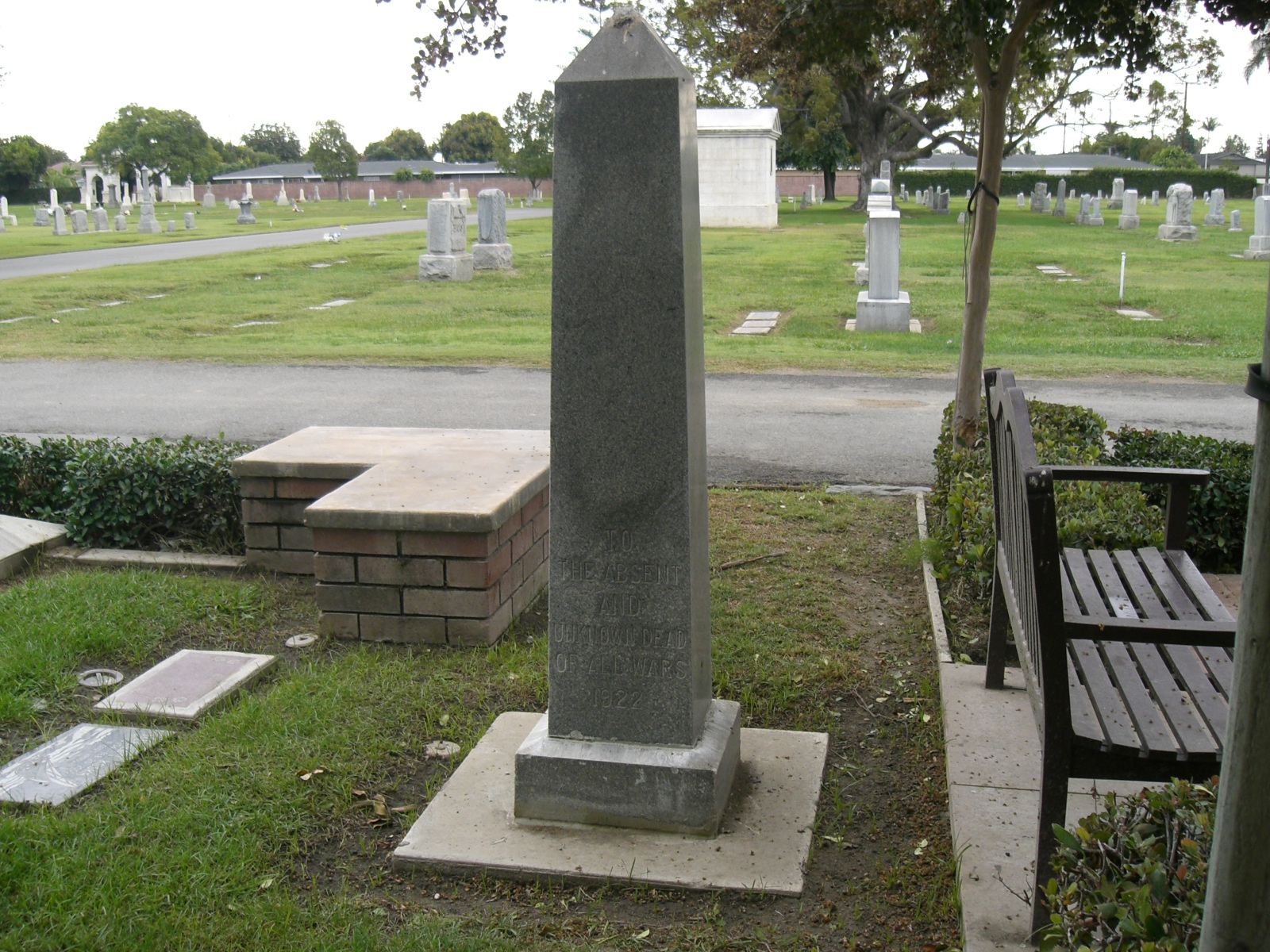
Grand Army of the Republic monument, Anaheim Cemetery, Orange County

Anaheim Cemetery is a public cemetery established by German immigrants in c. 1866 in Anaheim, Orange County, California. Since 2002, it has had a historical marker issued by the county.

== History ==
Anaheim Cemetery was founded in 1866, or 1867. Founding trustees of this cemetery included Theodore Schmidt, an immigrant from Bielefeld, Germany; and John Peter Zeyn, a merchant from San Francisco. The Pioneer Gate was erected in 1915, and donated by Fredrick A. Hartmann.

The earliest graves were of the German immigrant population, and some of the early German tombstones are intricately carved. Many of the early leaders of Anaheim and Orange County are interred at this cemetery.

== See also ==
- List of cemeteries in California
