= Chinese Cemetery =

Chinese Cemetery is a name given to many cemeteries around the world, generally in English speaking countries that have or had a significant ethnic or immigrant Chinese community.

Some notable cemeteries sometimes referred to as "Chinese Cemetery" are:

== Canada ==
- Chinese Cemetery at Harling Point, in Oak Bay near Victoria, British Columbia
- Kamloops Chinese Cemetery

== East Timor ==
- Chinese cemetery of Dili

== Malaysia ==
- Kuala Lumpur Chinese Cemetery

== Pakistan ==
- Chinese Cemetery (Danyor), Gilgit-Baltistan

== Philippines ==
- Manila Chinese Cemetery

== United States ==
- Chinese Cemetery (Idaho), near Warren, Idaho
- Chinese Cemetery of Los Angeles, California
- Chung Wah Cemetery, Folsom, California
- Waldo Chinese Cemetery, listed on the National Register of Historic Places in Josephine County, Oregon
