= Calvary Catholic Cemetery (San Jose, California) =

Cemetery in San Jose, California

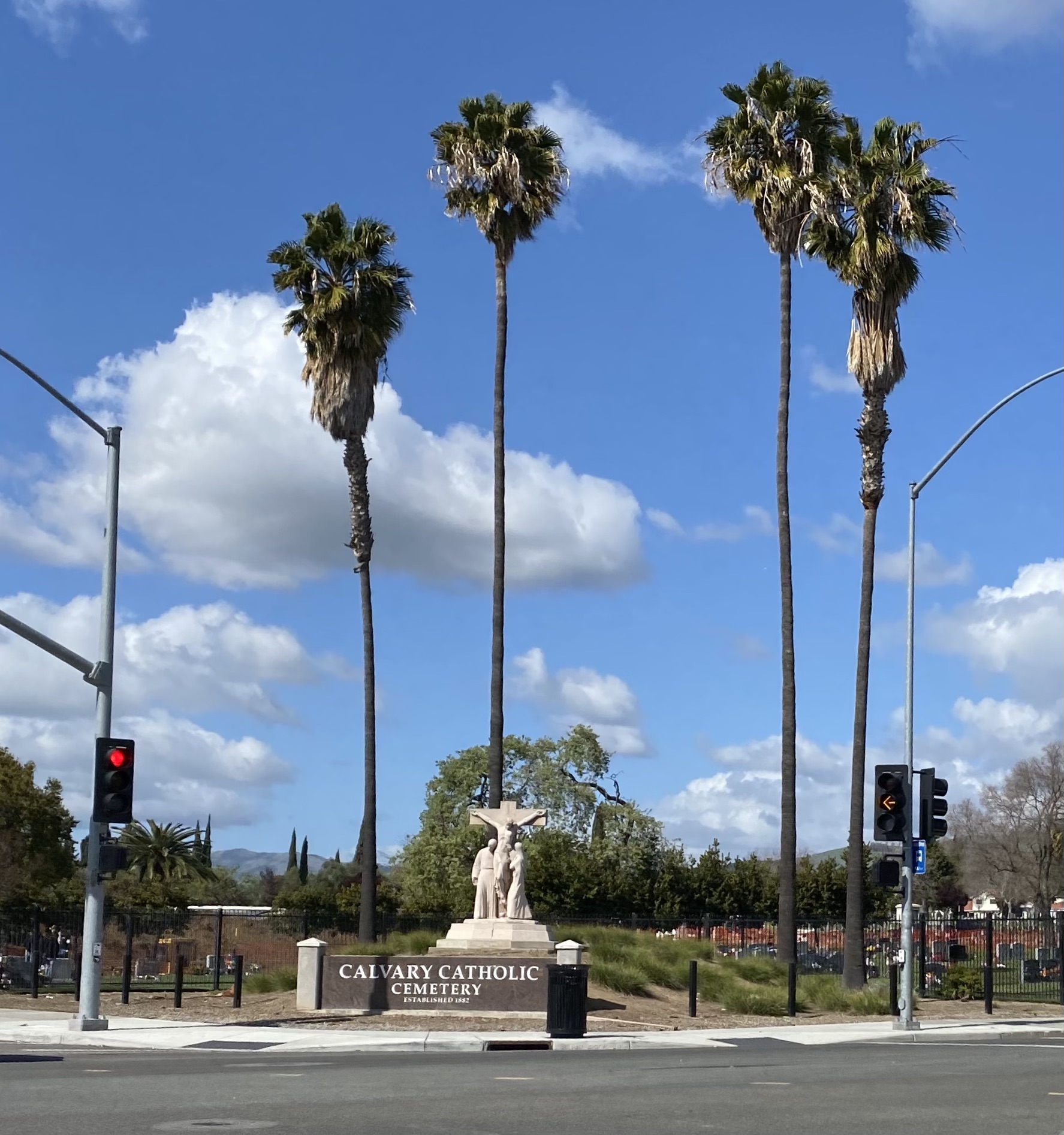
- Interactive map of Calvary Catholic Cemetery

Details
- Established: November 17, 1882
- Location: 2650 Madden Avenue, San Jose, California, United States
- Coordinates: 37.36488°N 121.83936°W
- Type: Catholic
- No. of graves: approx. 13,500
- Website: www.catholiccemeteriesdsj.org/contact/locations/calvary-san-jose/

Calvary Catholic Cemetery is a Catholic cemetery, founded in 1882 in the Alum Rock neighborhood of San Jose, California. It is owned by the Diocese of San Jose and run by Catholic Funeral & Cemetery Services San José and sits on 16 acres (6.5 ha).

== Notable burials ==
- Bertha Boronda (1877–1950) American criminal
- Louis Pellier (1817–1872) French-born American horticulturist and viticulturist, pioneer of the prune industry in San Jose

== See also ==
- List of cemeteries in California
