= Bembridge House =

Historic house in California, United States

- Green-Rankin-Bembridge House
- U.S. National Register of Historic Places
- Long Beach Historic Landmark
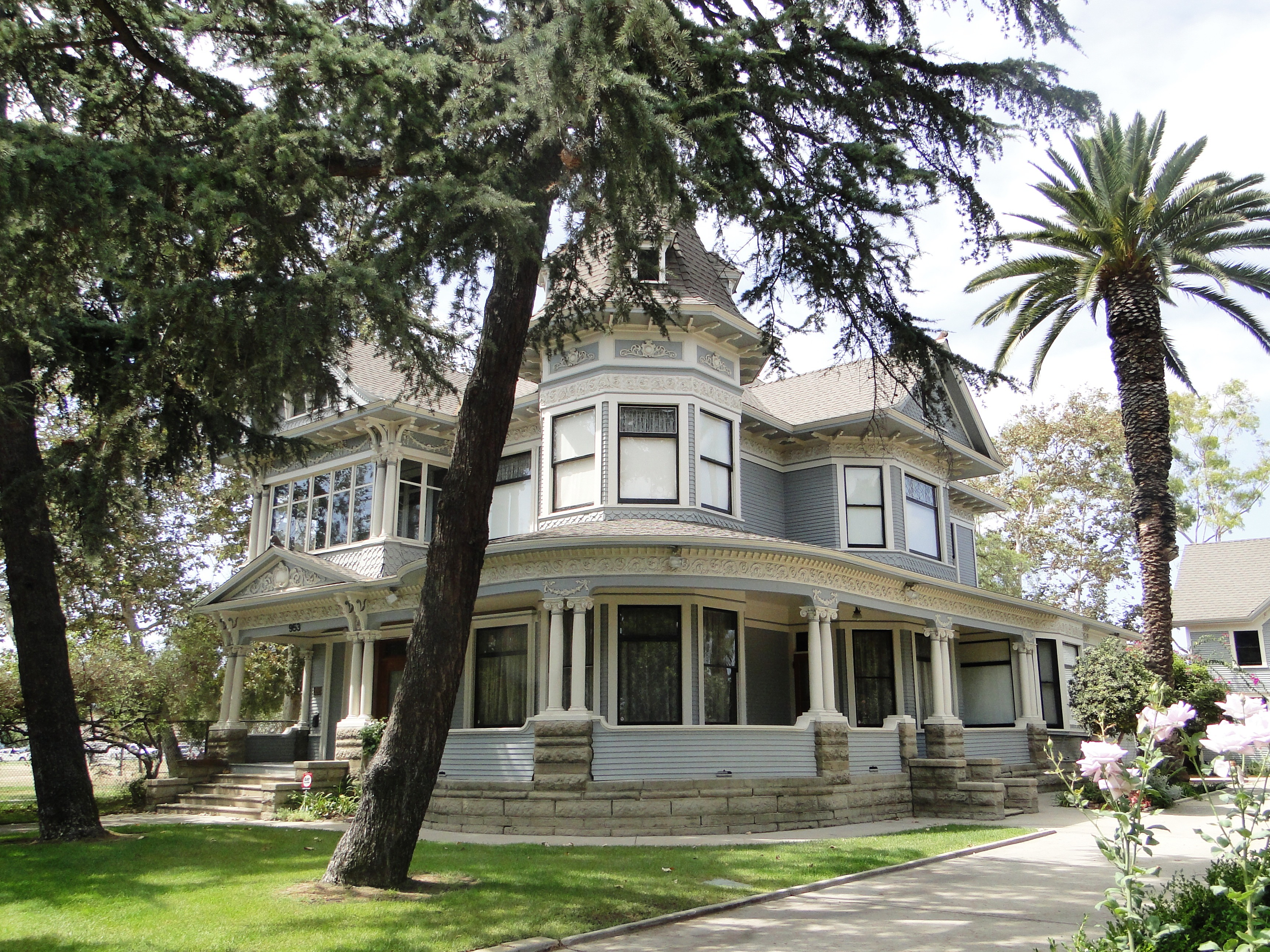
- Bembridge House in Long Beach, California, U.S.

- Location within the Los Angeles metropolitan area Location within California Location within the United States
- Location: 953 Park Circle Dr, Long Beach, California
- Coordinates: 33°46′45″N 118°12′4″W
- Area: Less than one acre
- Built: 1906
- Architectural style: Queen Anne, Victorian
- Website: https://www.lbheritage.org/bembridge-house/visit/
- NRHP reference No.: 05000002
- Added to NRHP: February 10, 2005

Bembridge House, also known as Green-Rankin-Bembridge House, is a registered historic building located across from Drake Park in the Willmore neighborhood of Long Beach, California. The ornate and well-preserved Queen Anne Victorian house was built in 1906. Musician and school teacher Dorothy Bembridge lived in the house from 1918 until she was murdered there in 1999. The house was acquired by Long Beach Heritage in 2000.

== Description ==
Bembridge House, located at 953 Park Circle Drive, Long Beach, California, is a Queen Anne Victorian house that was built in 1906. It has 18 rooms, and has been preserved with its original high ceilings, woodwork, and many of the original furnishings. It is considered the most ornate Victorian residence in Long Beach with hand-carved woodwork, stained and leaded glass, and a tiled fireplace. In 1981, the Los Angeles Times described the house as follows: "It is the city's only perfectly preserved Queen Anne mansion, an intricate arrangement of turrets, pillars, angles, beveled Tiffany glass windows, and white-on-blue scrollwork reminiscent of Wedgwood." Long Beach Heritage calls Bembridge House "the single most important example of this style of architecture remaining in Long Beach today", and notes that it is considered by many to be "the most significant residential historic landmark structure" in Long Beach.

== History ==
The house was built in 1906 by Stephen and Josephine Green. He was one of the founders of City National Bank, a wealthy businessman who came to Long Beach from Seattle and Los Angeles. Green planted exotic shrubs and flowers around the house and also built an aviary for his collection of foreign birds and a barn where he kept Shetland ponies.

Green was reportedly an unpopular man who had legal disputes with his neighbors. He reportedly suffered "a stroke of apoplexy" and died at the house after an encounter with a neighbor. His funeral was held at the house.

Thomas Rankin purchased the house in 1918 following Green's death. The house remained in the Rankin family for more than 80 years. After the death of Thomas Rankin, the house was inherited by his children, Dorothy Bembridge and Neil Rankin.

Dorothy Bembridge was a musician and a Long Beach school teacher until her retirement in 1968. Bembridge lived in the house starting in 1918 and noted that the interior was never renovated. She believed the curtains and soft floors created "a perfect acoustical environment" for frequent piano concerts held at the home.

In 1969, the house was threatened with demolition when the City of Long Beach sought to expand the adjacent Drake Park. At the time, historical preservationists lobbied to save the structure. Bembridge sought to have it preserved as a music center. In comments to a local newspaper, she said:

"I pray it can be saved. It's a wonderful old house — as solid as the Rock of Gibraltar. There's not a break in the foundation; not a crack in the walls. It's absolutely the only one of its kind in town that has not been altered. It would have special charm as a music center. The tower serves as a natural megaphone, making the acoustics remarkable. Many say they have never heard anything like the sounds that ring out from the Steinway in this old house."

In 1981, the Long Beach Cultural Heritage Committee designated Bembridge House as a Long Beach Historic Landmark. It was among the second group of structures to receive the designation. At the time of the designation, Bembridge told the Los Angeles Times that she was "content at last that the home she's lived in since 1918 will be preserved in all its magnificence."

In 1999, Bembridge was strangled at the house at age 89. Her body was discovered in the backyard on November 4, 1999. Daniel William Borunda, a 51-year-old man who had done odd jobs for Bembridge and had been sent to prison for burglarizing her home in 1990, was eventually convicted of Bembridge's murder and sentenced to 60-years-to-life in prison. Borunda had been released from prison in October 1999, a few weeks before the murder. Police and prosecutors asserted that the motive was burglary and revenge.

After Bembridge's death, Long Beach Heritage purchased the house in 2000 for $325,000. The group has restored the house to its original state and it is open for tours.

In 2002, Long Beach Heritage received a $72,000 grant from the J. Paul Getty Trust to develop a master plan to preserve the main house, carriage house and aviary, and to restore landscaping and for seismic strengthening and improved access for the disabled.

Bembridge House, located at 953 Park Circle Drive, Long Beach, California, was also listed on the National Register of Historic Places in February 2005.

== See also ==
- List of City of Long Beach Historic Landmarks
- National Register of Historic Places listings in Los Angeles County, California
