= Conejo Mountain Funeral Home, Memorial Park and Crematory =

Cemetery in Camarillo, California

Coordinates: 34°11′04″N 119°00′06″W

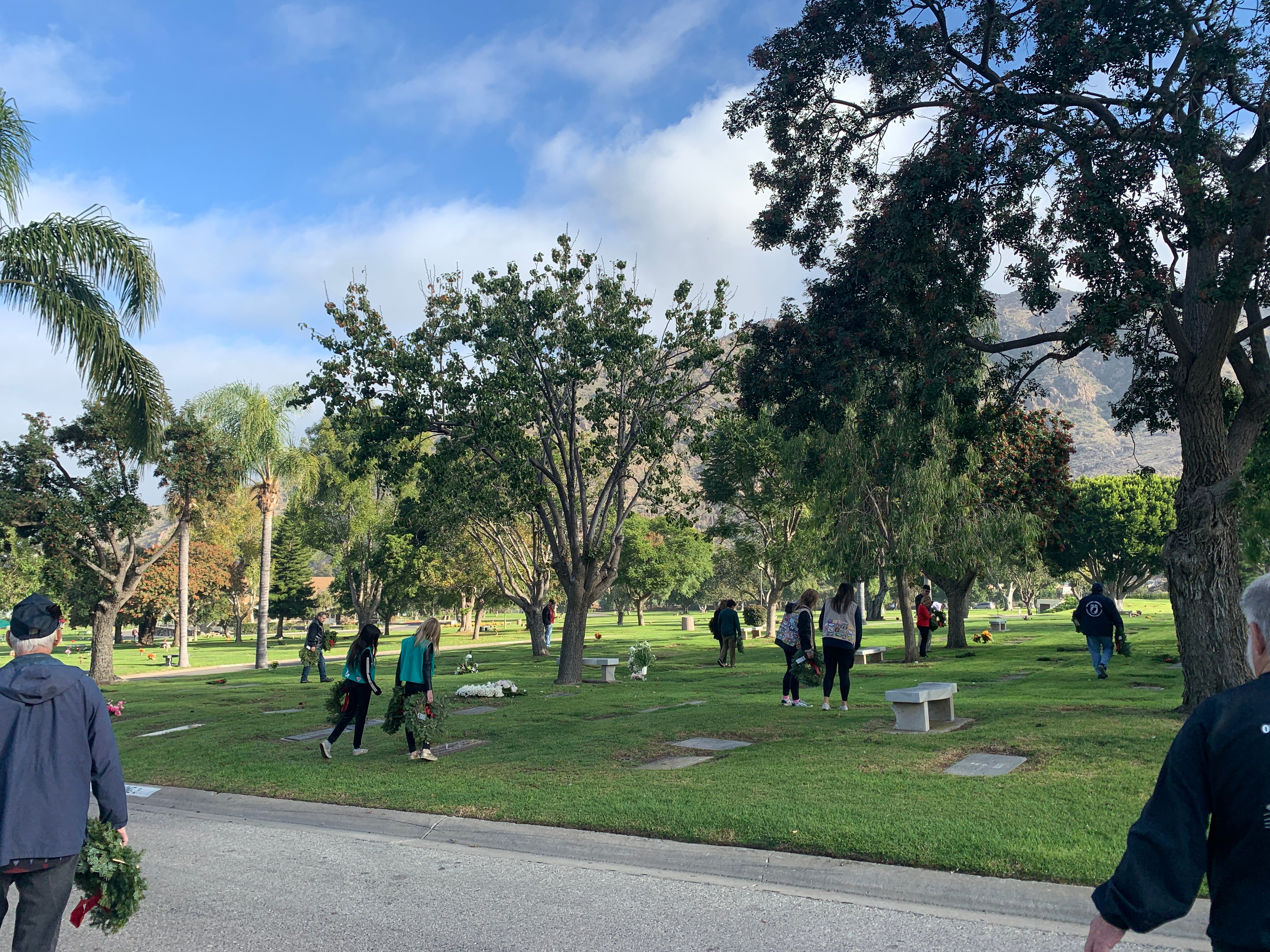
Conejo Mountain Memorial Park in 2020.

Conejo Mountain Funeral Home, Memorial Park and Crematory is a funeral home and cemetery in Camarillo, Ventura County, California, established in 1965.

== Background ==
The original cemetery was a way of fighting off developers who proposed to buy chunks of property owned by Camarillo rancher Mary Smith, known for being opinionated and a woman of action. Mrs. Smith "soaked the farm" to raise $100,000.00 needed to get the cemetery project off the ground. "I just had no use for subdividers..."

The Smith Ranch, begun in 1936 by J.V. (Jake) and Mary Smith. With the passing of Jake in 1949, Mary had farmed the ranch herself with the help of farmhands. Originally 800 acres (3.2 km^{2}), the property today only consists of the 119 acres (0.48 km^{2}) of the cemetery. Due to the generosity of Mary Smith, the Camarillo Sanitary District treatment plant takes up a portion of the original 800 acres (3.2 km^{2}).

The historic Chapel of the Islands, built in 1942 and was originally named Mary Star of the Sea Catholic Church in Port Hueneme, California. In 1962 this church was part of the 33-acre (130,000 m^{2}) Urban Renewal Project in Port Hueneme and had to be relocated or lost forever. In 1966 Mary Smith's bid to buy the church was accepted and the church was moved to the cemetery in February 1966 using portable aircraft landing strips to its new home in the middle of the former bean field turned cemetery.

Mary Smith died in October 1992 and was quoted, "I pray the good Lord doesn't send me to the city to finish my days. When they move me, I hope they move me feet first. I would rather die with my boots on than off."

Since 1965, the cemetery has constructed mausoleum buildings and a state of the art funeral and cremation facility was dedicated in May 2007.

== Notable burials ==
- L. Macon Epps (1920–2012), engineer, inventor, author, and poet.
- Don Iwerks (1929-2026), Disney Executive and Founder of Iwerks Entertainment
- Emil Sitka (1914–1998), an actor who worked with The Three Stooges.
- Frank B. McDonald (1899–1980), film director.

== See also ==
- List of cemeteries in California
