= The Italian Cemetery (Colma, California) =

Cemetery in Colma, California

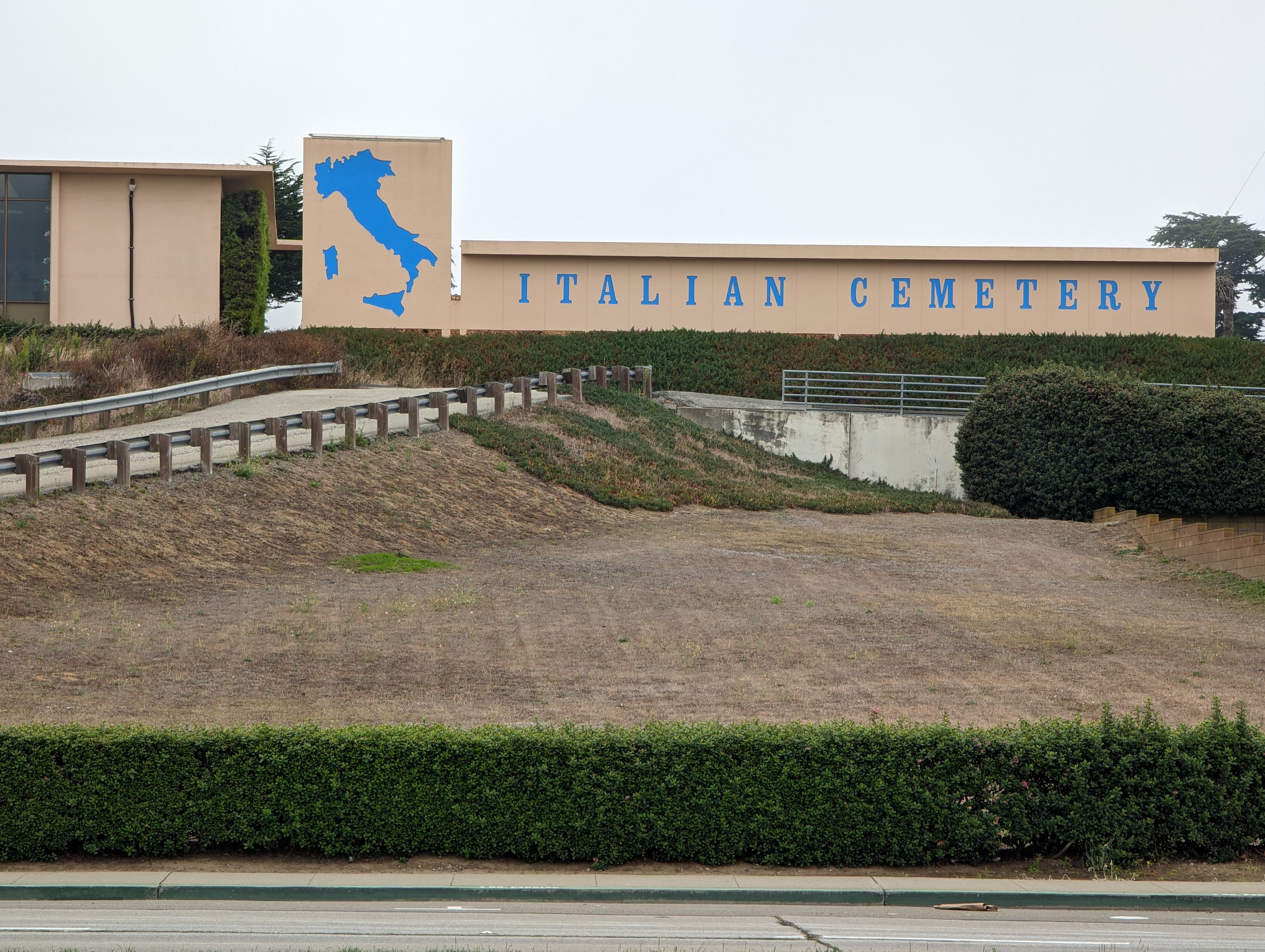
- Sign facing El Camino Real, featuring a map of Italy, Sicily, and Sardinia

Details
- Established: 1899; 126 years ago
- Location: Colma, California
- Country: United States
- Coordinates: 37.6824°N 122.4606°W
- Type: Non-sectarian
- Owned by: La Società Italiana di Mutua Beneficenza
- Website: www.italiancemetery.com
- Find a Grave: The Italian Cemetery

The Italian Cemetery was founded in 1899 and is located at 540 F Street in Colma, California, initially serving the Italian community of the San Francisco Bay Area.

== History ==
La Società Italiana di Mutua Beneficenza (the Italian Benevolent Society) maintained a section of City Cemetery near Point Lobos in San Francisco, which were granted by the Board of Supervisors in June 1879. Eighteen years later, in June 1897, the Board of Supervisors passed a resolution prohibiting new burials within the city limits of San Francisco by January 1898. The Society filed suit against the city, but it was dismissed. Later that year, the Society applied for a permit to establish a new Italian Cemetery in the Villa Homestead Association of Colma; neighboring property owners protested, and the permit was denied, setting a precedent for where cemeteries could be placed.

On December 31, 1898, the Society purchased a property on F Street in Colma for the new Italian Cemetery; since then, it has expanded to both sides of F Street, covering 35 acres (14 ha) in total. John (Giovanni) Fugazi, a prominent San Francisco banker, sponsored a monument for the new cemetery, selecting a design by Zocchi.

The Receiving Vault is one of the oldest structures onsite; it was designed by John A. Porporato and completed in 1904. Porporato's initial plans for a mortuary chapel were accepted in 1902 and shown in 1903.

In 1909, San Francisco announced it was planning to convert Golden Gate (City) Cemetery into a park; a decade later, in 1919, John McLaren began preparing to move the remains from the old Italian Cemetery. An appropriation of $7,500 was made by the Board of Supervisors to purchase the land and expand the golf course in Lincoln Park, which drew protests; ultimately, the bodies were relocated to Colma.

Many of the early records were lost following an arson on August 4, 1923, when the cemetery office was burned and numerous headstones were overturned. In 1978, the cemetery was reorganized as an independent, non-profit corporation.

The expansion, north of F Street, contains a public mausoleum and chapel designed by Robert K. Overstreet and Arthur Stern Studios, which won American Institute of Architects awards in 1987.

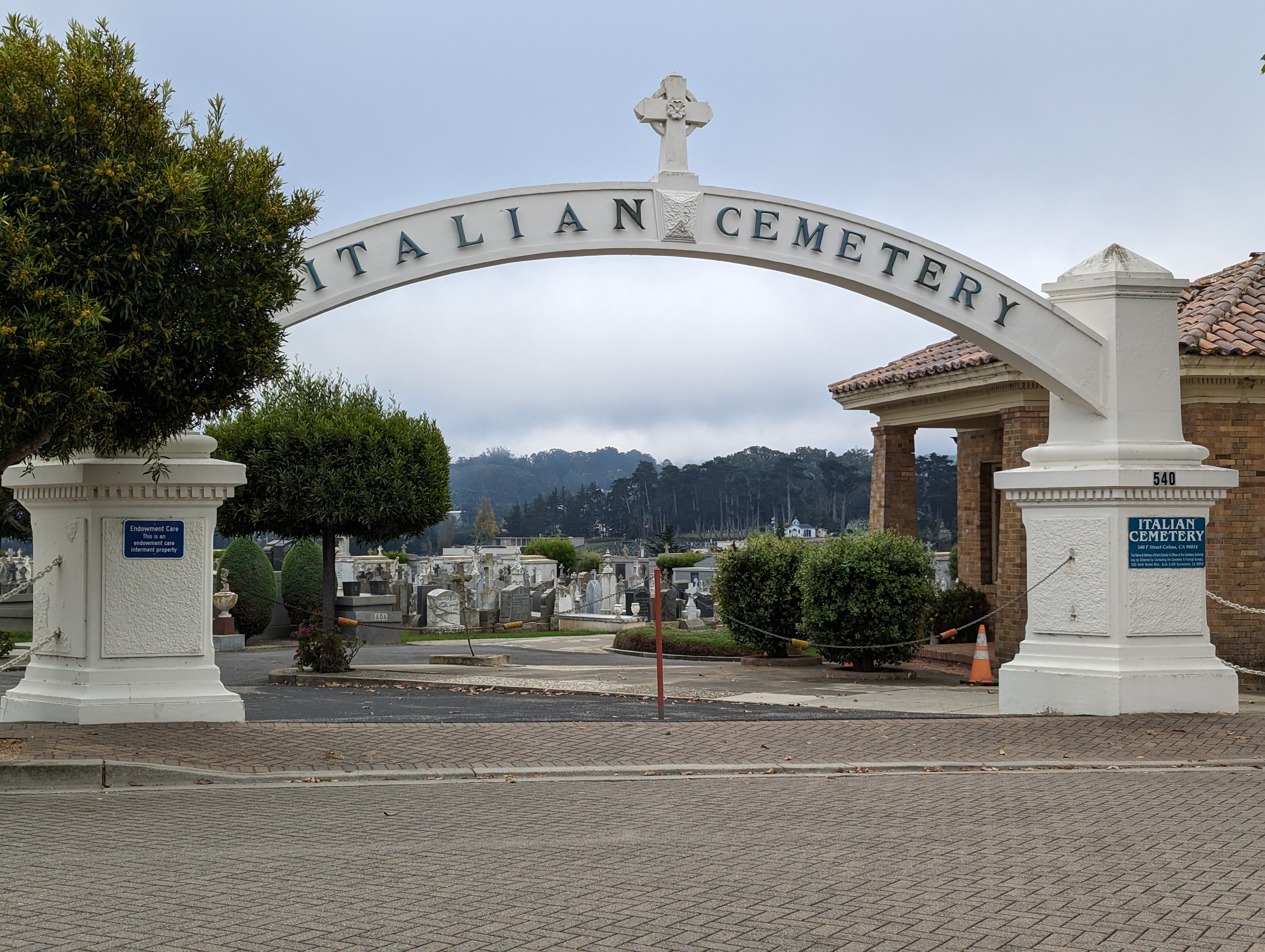
Archway over entrance from F Street

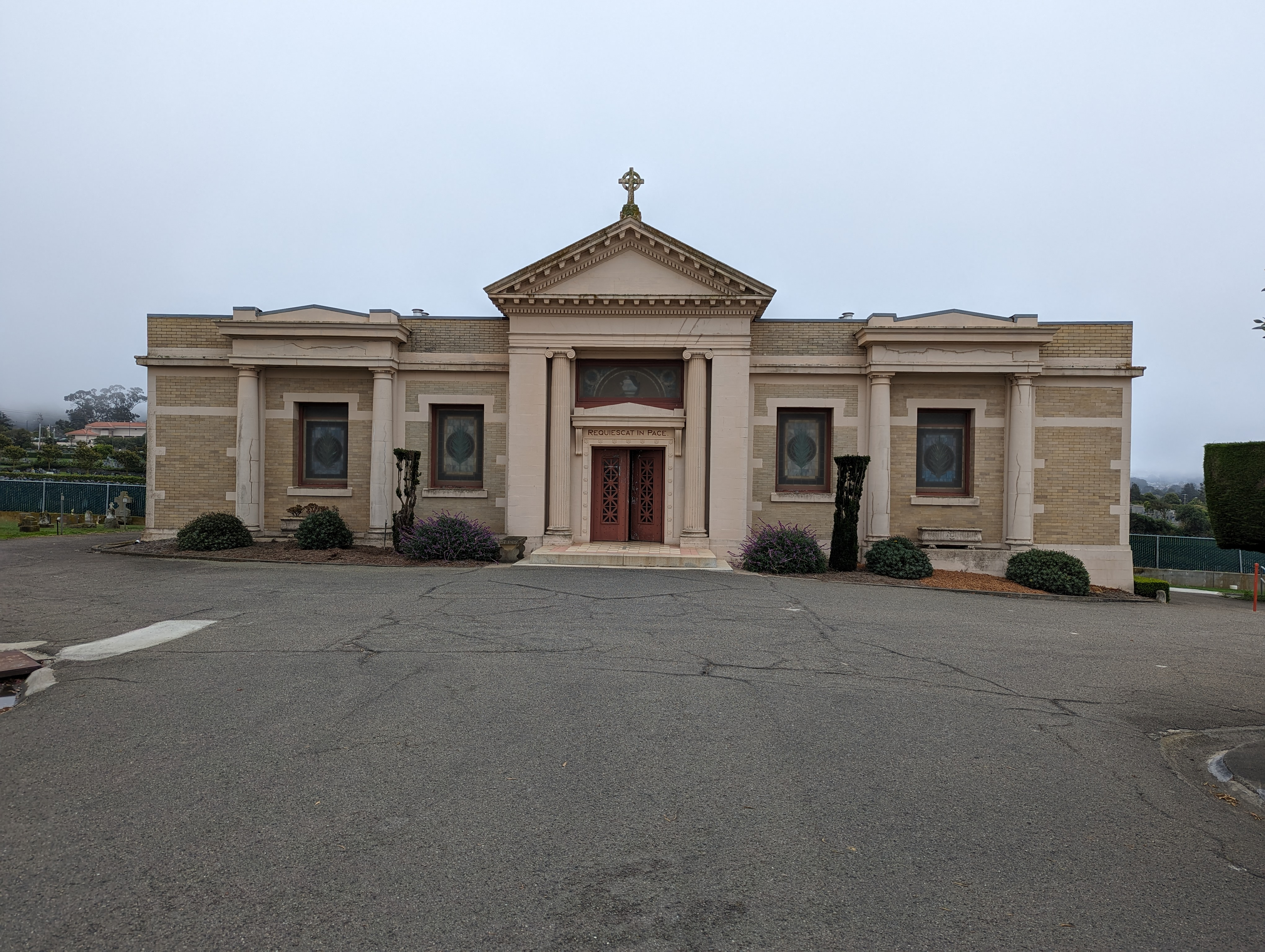
Receiving Vault, designed by John A. Porporato

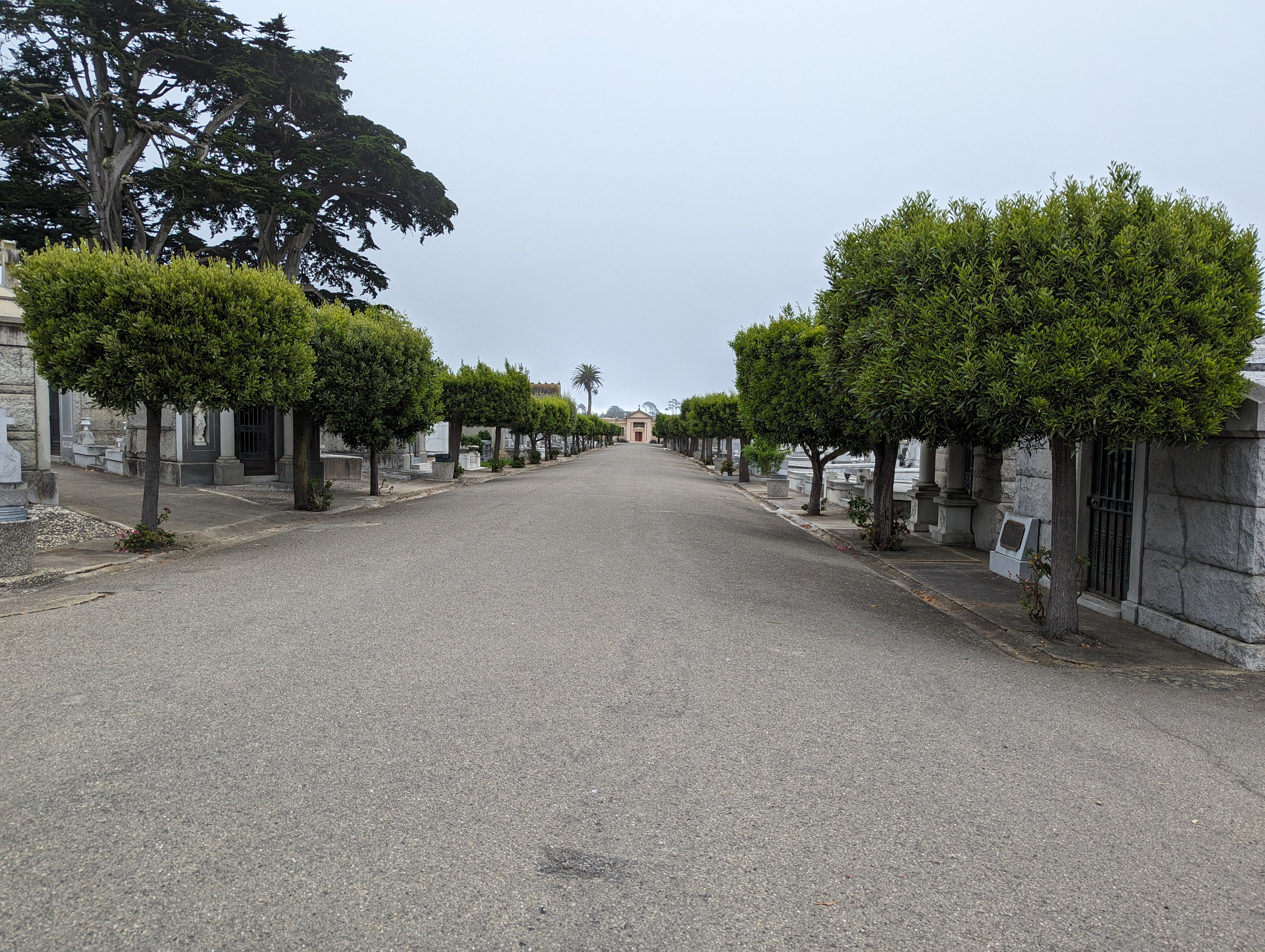
Tree-lined Colombo Avenue

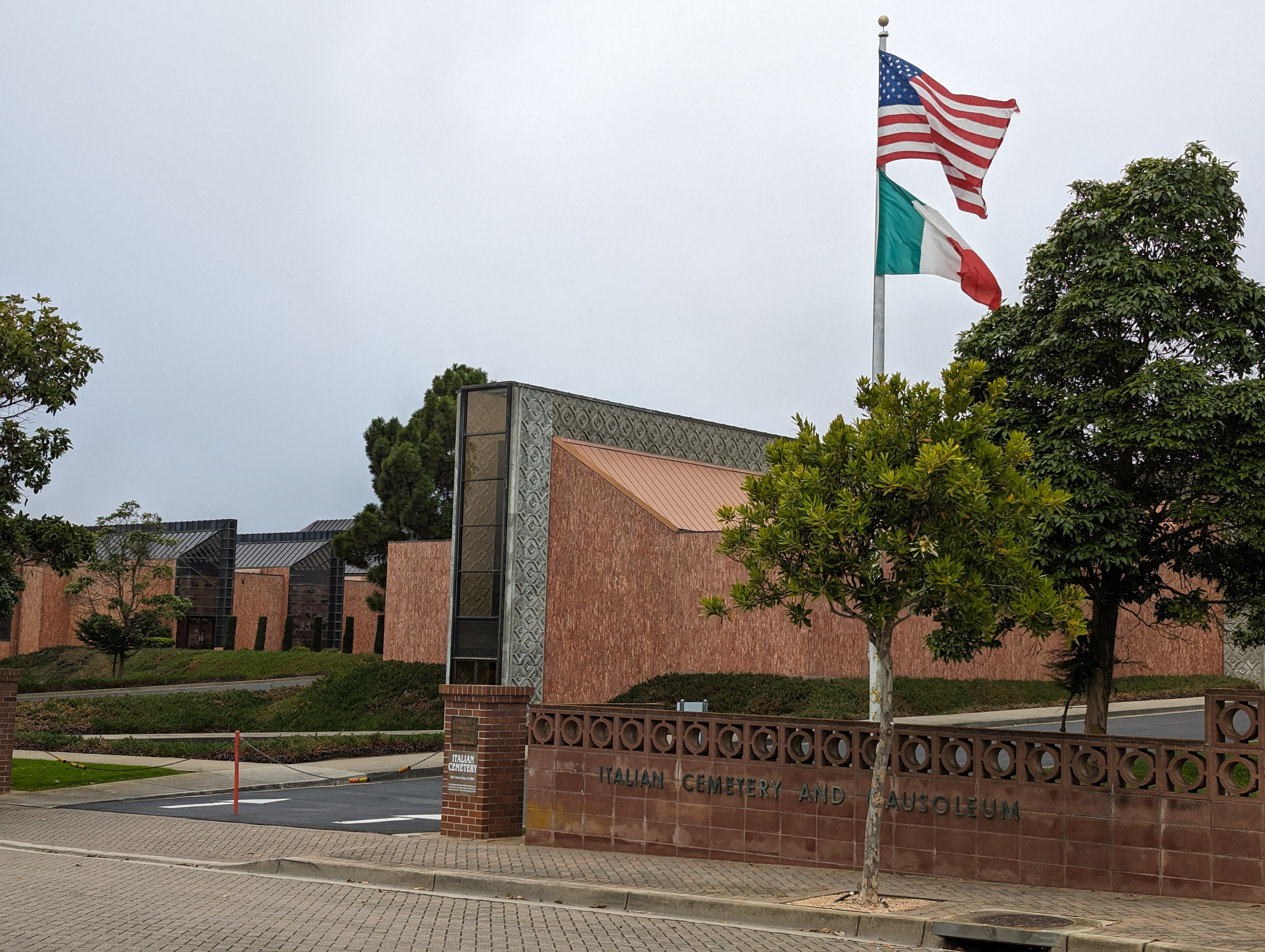
Modern mausoleums north of F Street

== Notable burials ==
- Fred Apostoli (1913–1973), boxer
- Brian Bianchini (1978–2004), model and actor
- Jay Lawrence (1924–1987), actor
- Joe Orengo (1914–1988), Major League Baseball player
- Robert S. Pastorino (1940–2013), diplomat
- Kevin Restani (1951–2010), National Basketball Association player
- Cal Tjader (1925–1982), Latin Jazz musician

== See also ==
- List of cemeteries in California
