= Old Santa Rosa Catholic Church and Cemetery =

Historical site in San Luis Obispo County, California, US

- U.S. National Register of Historic Places
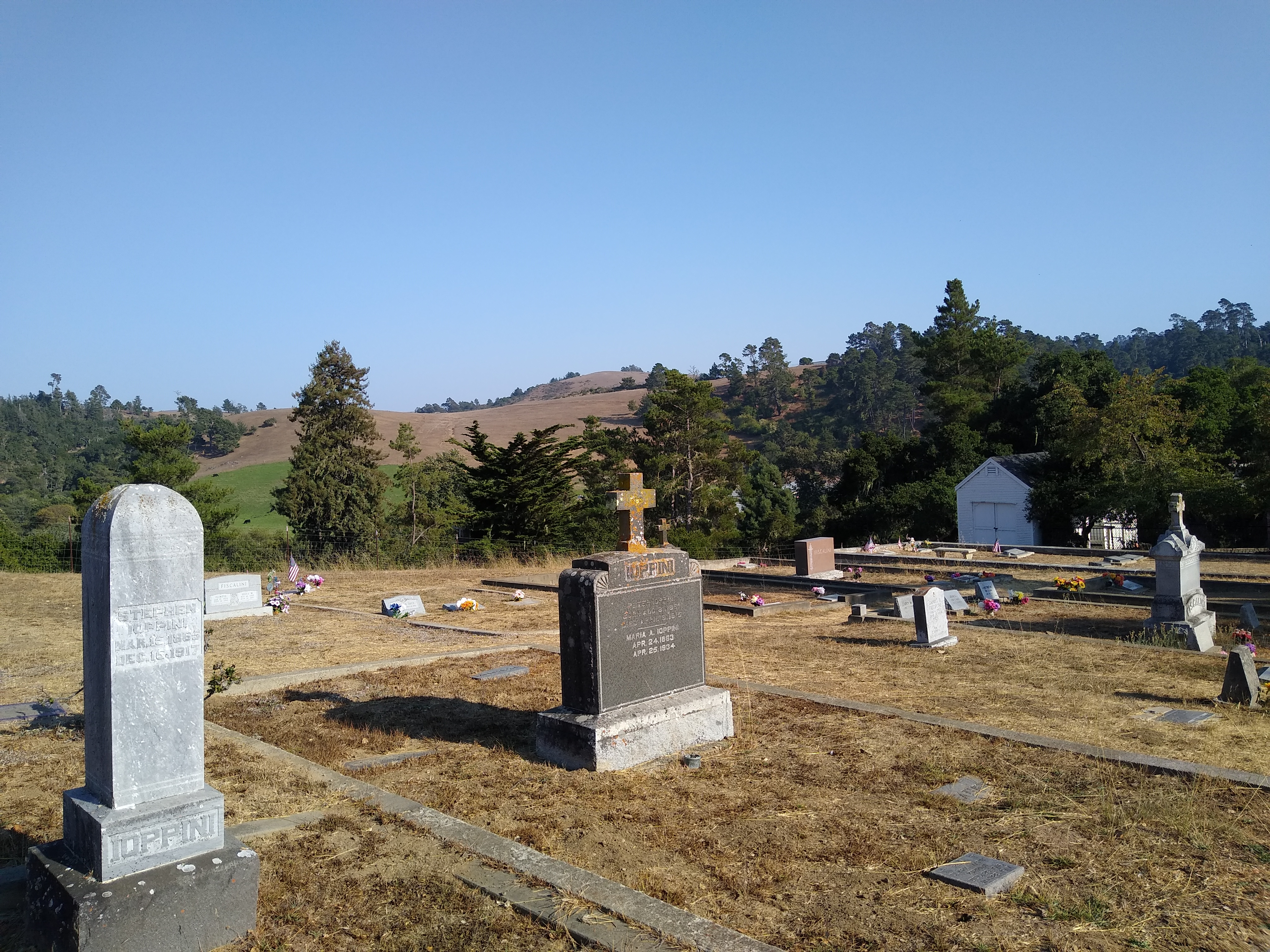
- Old Santa Rosa Cemetery

- Location within California Location within the United States
- Location: Main St., Cambria, California
- Coordinates: 35°33′58″N 121°04′53″W
- Area: 2.5 acres (1.0 ha)
- Built: 1870–71
- NRHP reference No.: 82000990
- Added to NRHP: October 29, 1982

The Old Santa Rosa Catholic Church and Cemetery is a historic church building and cemetery on Main Street in Cambria, San Luis Obispo County, California. Built from 1870 to 1871, the church was the first in Cambria and is one of the oldest remaining buildings in the town. The church has a simple Classical Revival design with clapboard siding, a gable roof, a boxed cornice and frieze, and an arched entrance topped with a fanlight. The church's cemetery is behind the church building.

The church was added to the National Register of Historic Places on October 29, 1982.
