= Colfax District Cemetery =

Cemetery in Place County, California

Coordinates: 39°05′55″N 120°56′55″W

The Colfax District Cemetery is a cemetery in Colfax, Placer County, California, at 180 N. Canyon Way.
