= Willmore, Long Beach, California =

Coordinates: 33.778°N 118.200°W

Willmore
- Neighborhood of Long Beach
- Interactive map of Willmore
- Country: United States
- State: California
- County: Los Angeles
- City: Long Beach

Willmore is a neighborhood in Long Beach, California. It is adjacent to Downtown Long Beach.

== History ==
The neighborhood is named after a forerunner of Long Beach, Willmore City. The township was developed by William E. Willmore on 4000 acres leased from Jotham Bixby and Rancho Los Cerritos in 1881. In 1884, the Rancho reclaimed the land for non-payment and resold the area to the Long Beach Land and Water Company.

Drake Park is named for Col. Charles Rivers Drake, who donated the park's land in 1904. Drake developed the precursor of The Pike amusement zone, and established the Virginia Country Club.

The Willmore City Heritage Association was founded in 1976.

== Architecture ==
- George L. Hoodenpyl - Windham House (The Lord Mayor's Inn), a California Craftsman built for the first mayor of Long Beach, Charles H. Windham
- Bembridge House

== Gallery ==
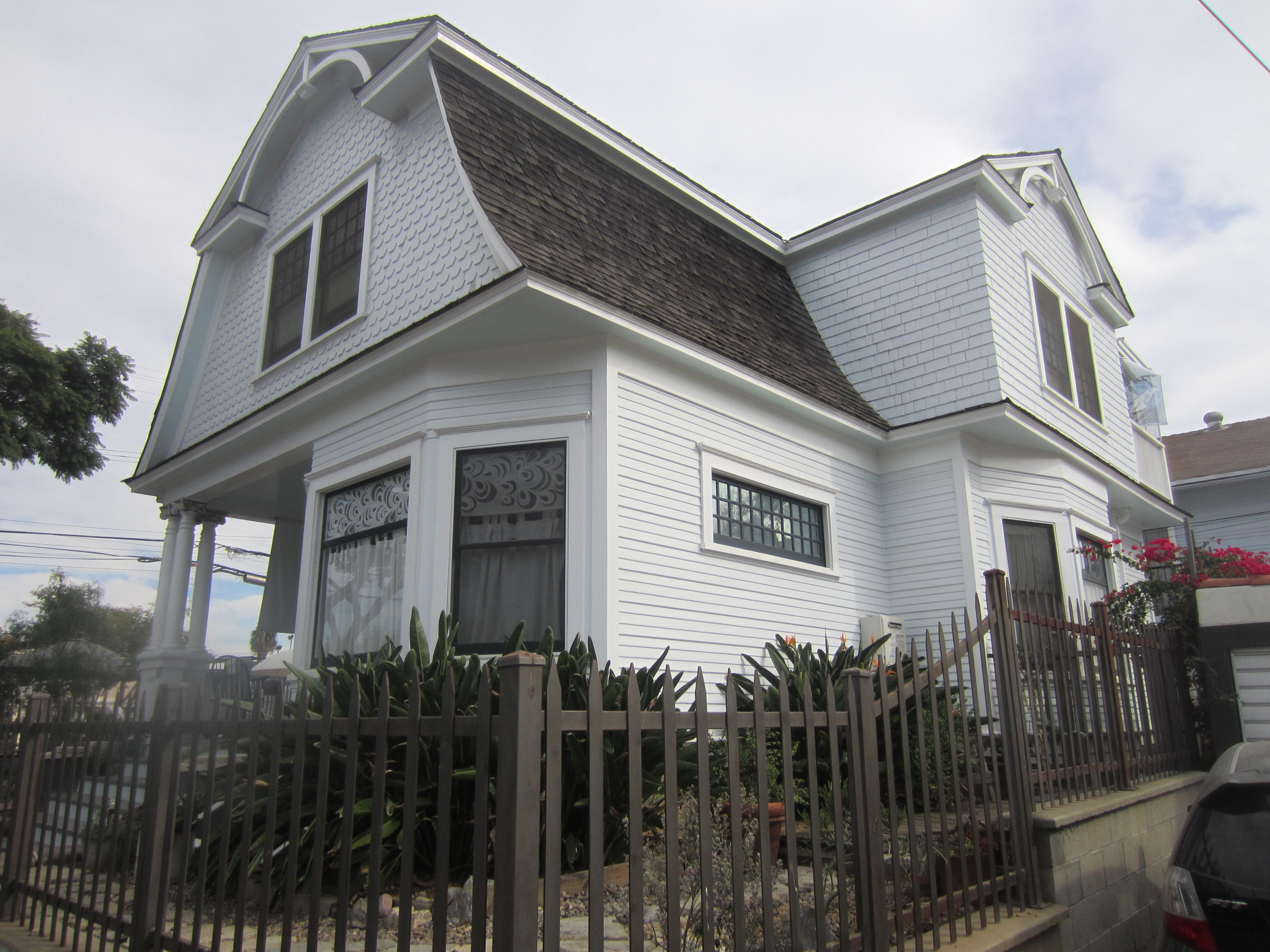
Flossie Lewis House

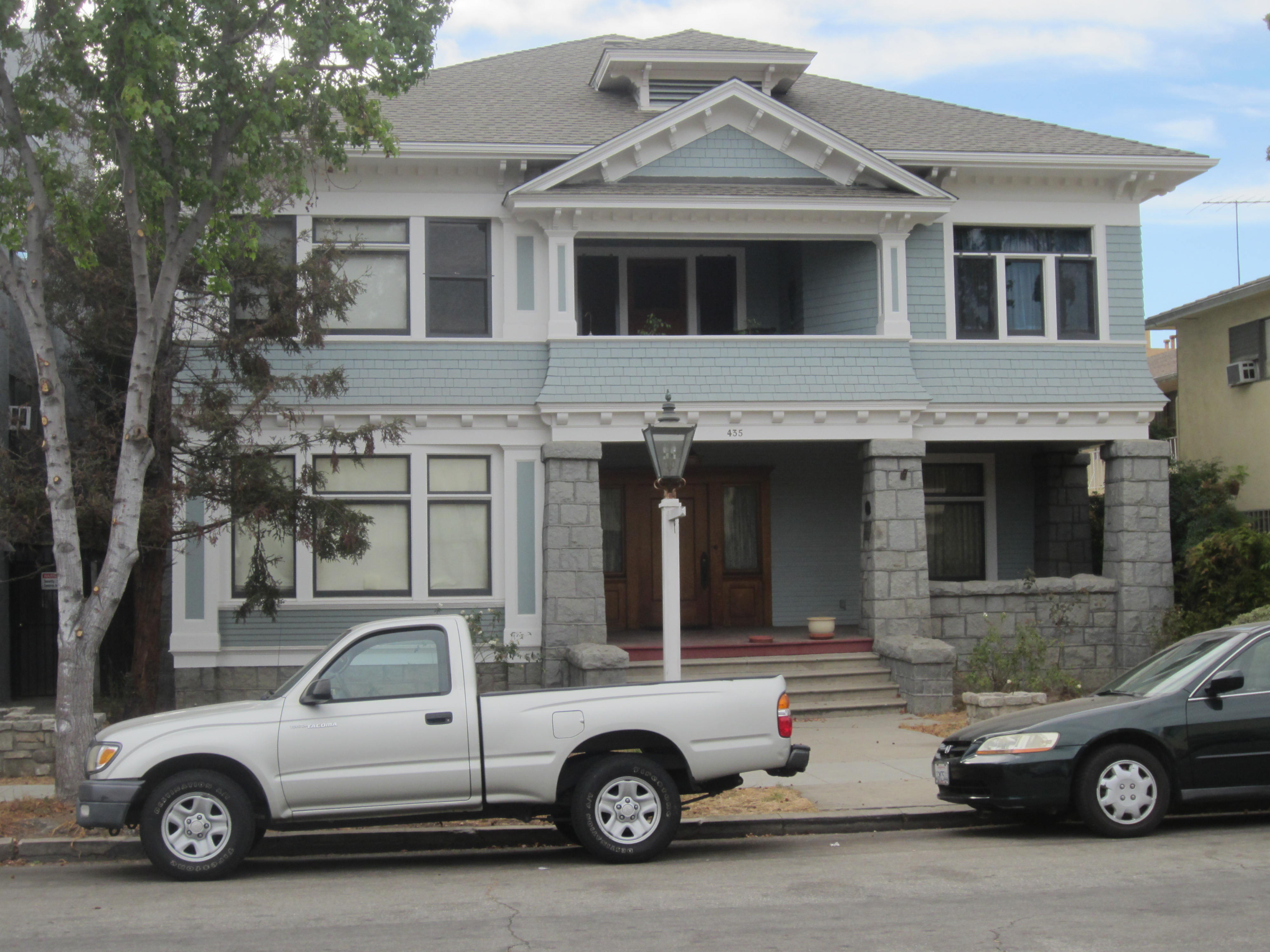
Lord Mayor's Inn

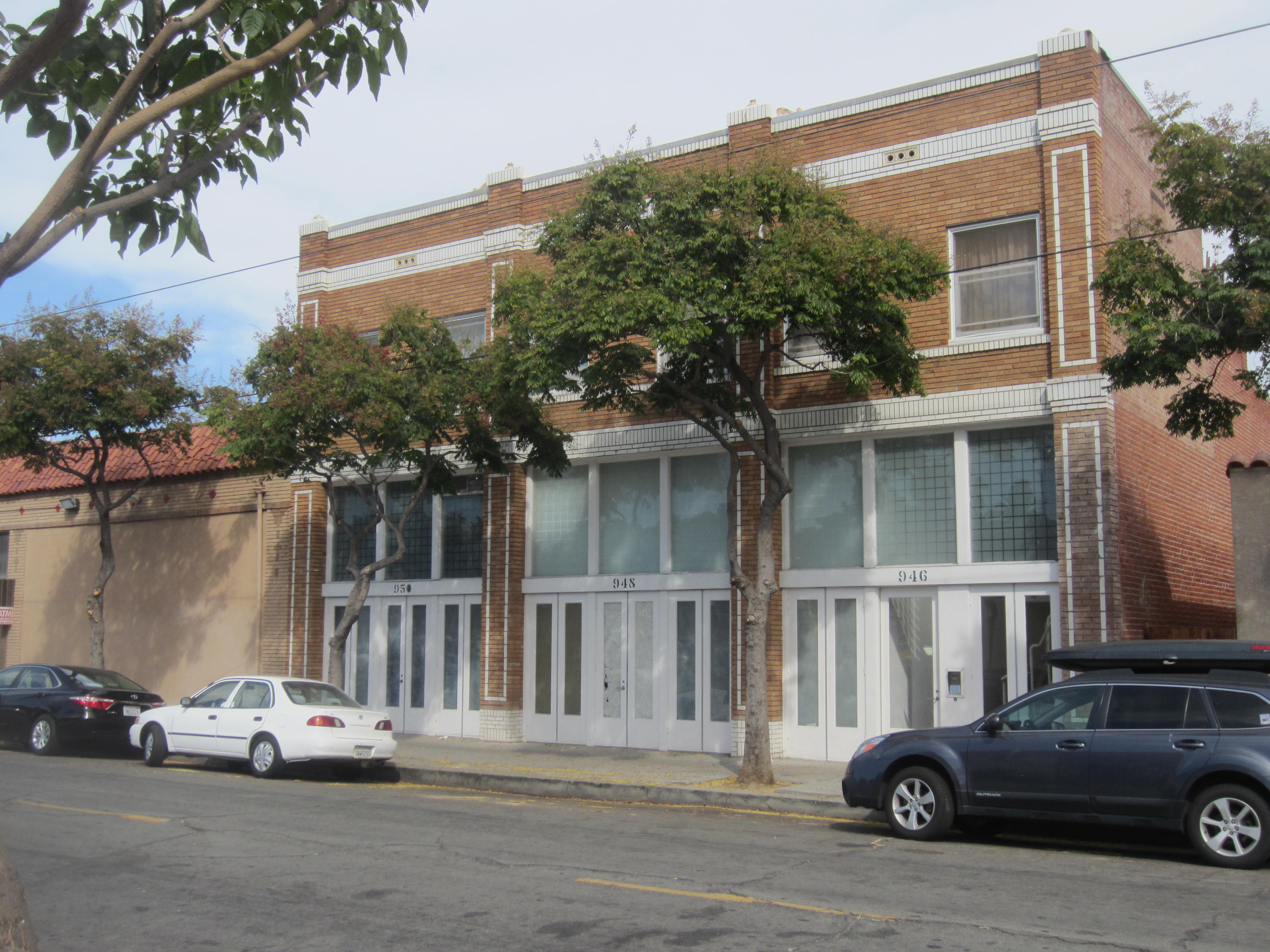
Home Market

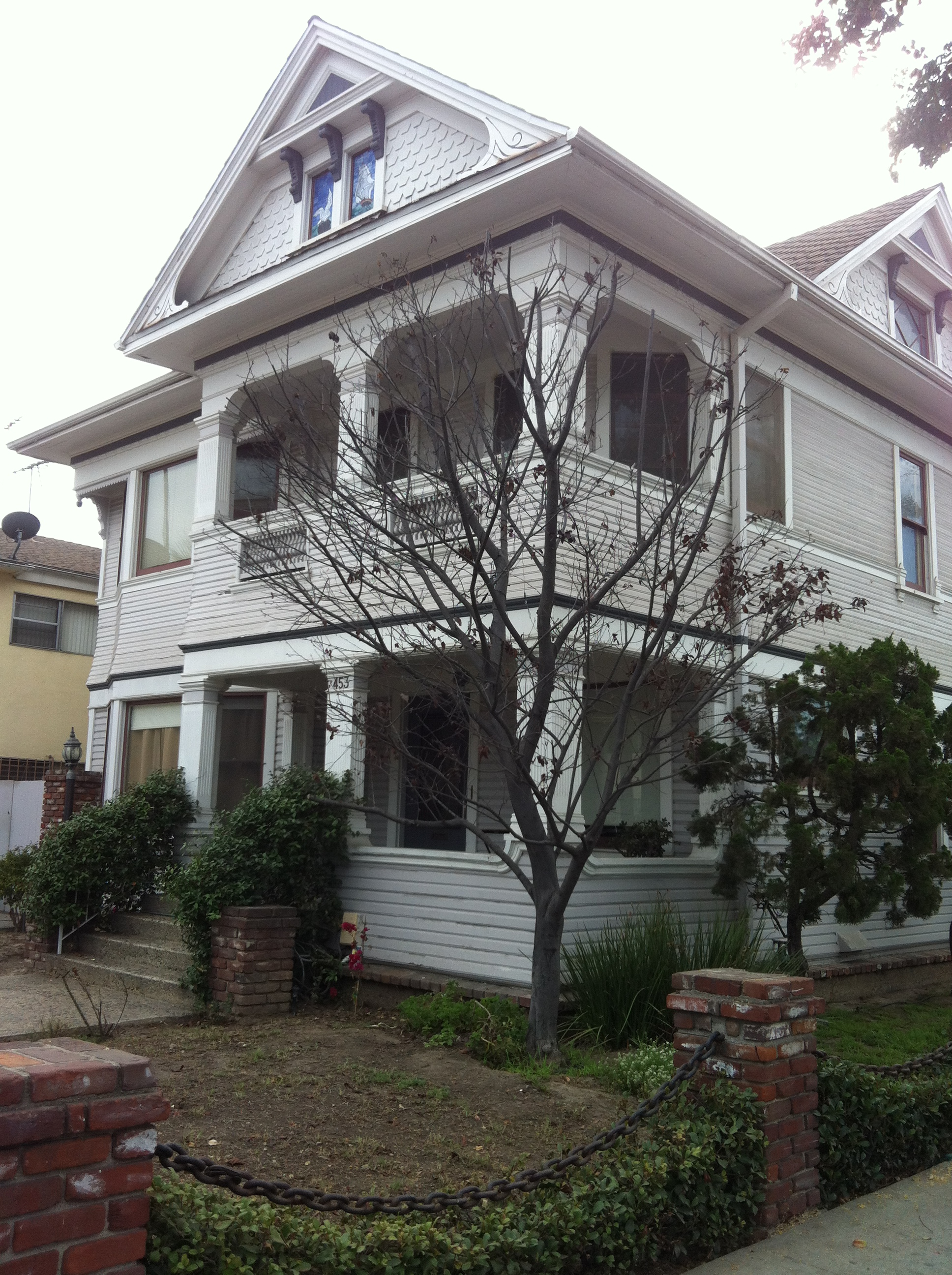
A residence

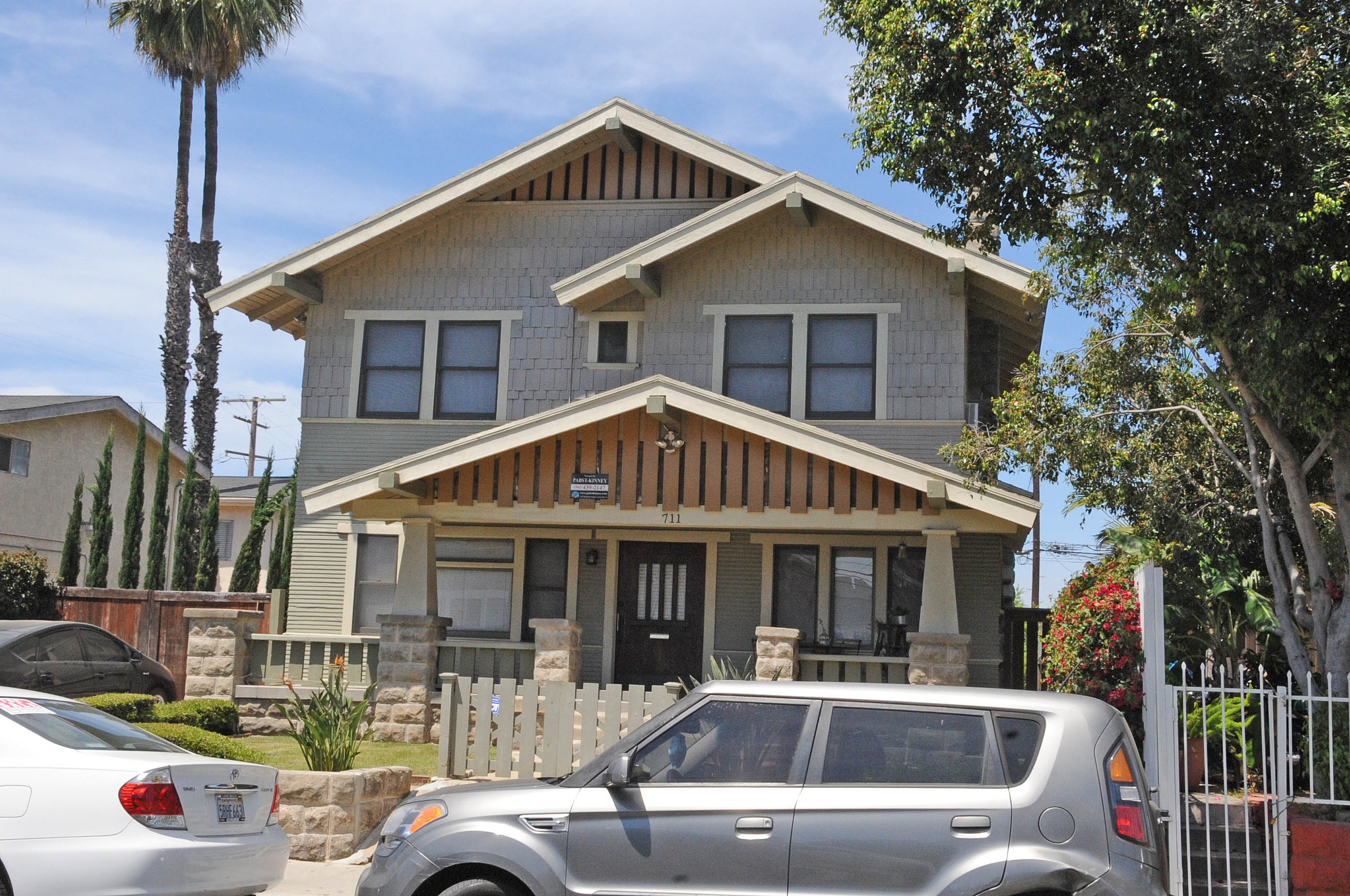
Joseph and Carrie Torrey House, 1911

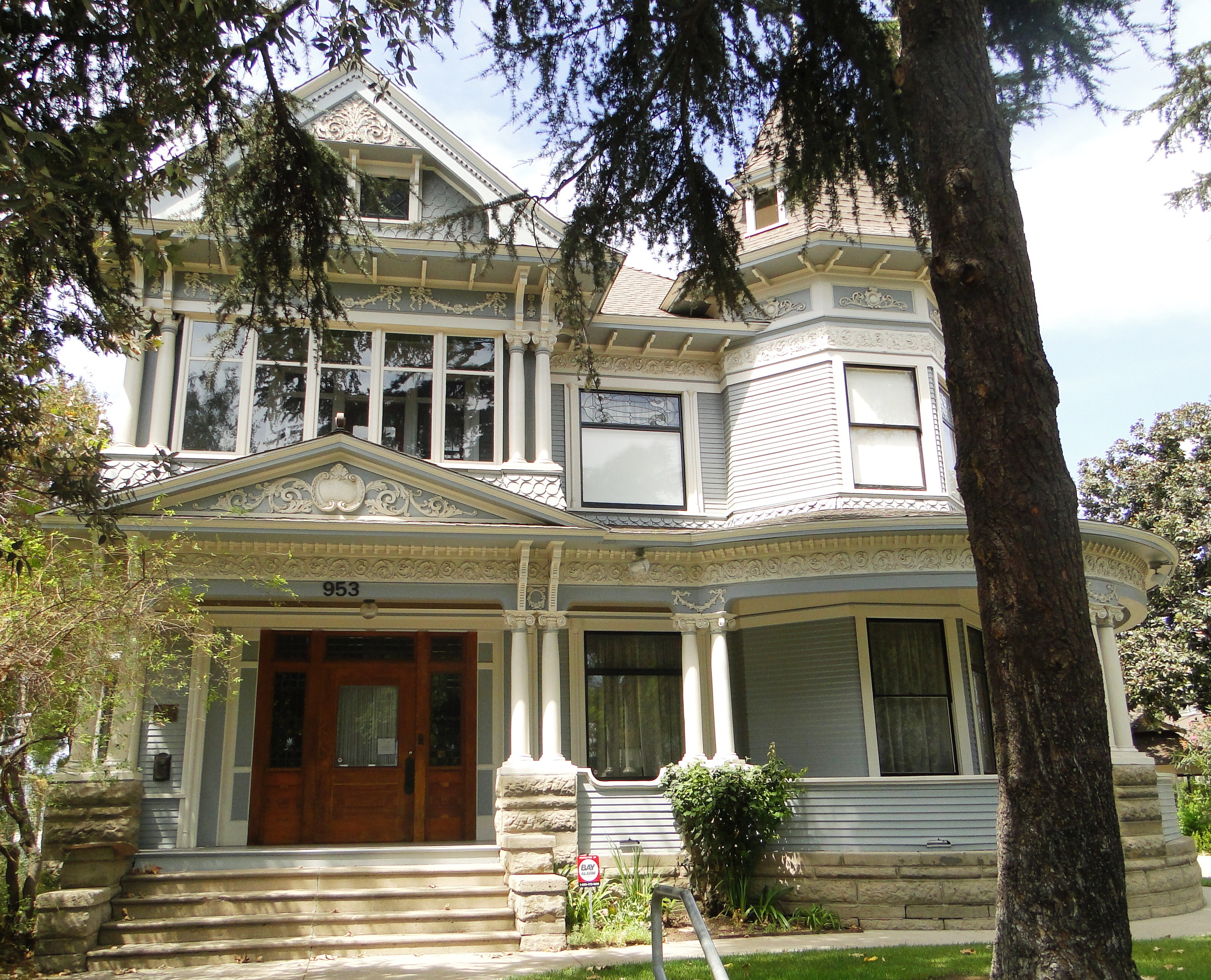
Bembridge House

== See also ==
- Neighborhoods of Long Beach, California
