= L. Macon Epps =

American poet (1920–2012)

Luther Macon Epps (January 16, 1920 – August 30, 2012) was an American engineer, inventor, author and poet. He studied Aeronautical Engineering at North Carolina State University, graduating in 1940. As an engineer and manager he worked for the Grumman Aerospace Corporation for 37 years. Most notably he worked on the Apollo Lunar Module as the Assistant Program Manager, but he also had other positions. As an inventor he received a patent in 1978 for a "combined water heater and sauna room heater device". He was a lifelong member of the Rotary International. After his retirement, Epps founded the I-Cubed Corporation, which specialized in new innovations and part-time jobs for other retired engineers. Just a few days before his death, he ended second place in a writing contest in the retirement community University Village Thousand Oaks.

== Bibliography ==
Epps authored numerous books, among which were short stories, children's stories, books on designs, books on spiritual traditions and his memoirs.

=== Books ===
- Little girls in cross-stitch: Designs, Green Apple Co, 1979
- For and About Children, Green Apple, 1981
- Universal Spiritual Thoughts: Comparative Quotations on Twenty Virtues from Nine Spiritual Traditions, 1st Book Library, 3 October 2003, with co-author William N. Garlington
- Senior Short Stories: Written By A Senior For Other Seniors, CreateSpace Independent Publishing Platform, 30 December 2008
- Old Granddad's Children's Stories, CreateSpace Independent Publishing Platform, 12 April 2009
- Looking Back 90 Years: True Experiences—1924 To 2009, CreateSpace Independent Publishing Platform, 17 January 2010

=== Pamphlets ===
- Think Snow- Graphed Designs on Snow Skiing, Green Apple Co, 1981
- Prayer Rug (Design in Counted Cross Stitch, 8171), P.M. Designs, 1981
- Christmas Gift Children Counted Cross Stitch Craft Book (Book #522), Green Apple Company, 1998
