= Sunnyside Cemetery =

Cemetery in Long Beach, California

- Interactive map of Sunnyside Cemetery

Details
- Established: c. 1906
- Location: 1095 E. Willow Street, Long Beach, Los Angeles County, California, U.S.
- Coordinates: 33°48′19″N 118°10′44″W
- Type: Public
- Owned by: City of Long Beach
- Website: https://www.longbeach.gov/park/park-and-facilities/directory/long-beach-municipal-cemetery/
- Find a Grave: Sunnyside Cemetery

Sunnyside Cemetery, is a cemetery established in 1906 in Long Beach, California.

It is adjacent to Long Beach Municipal Cemetery. The cemetery encountered financial troubles in the 1990s when its owner, Dean A. Dempsey, stole over half the cemetery's endowment fund.

== Notable burials ==
- Nelson W. Ward
- C.J. Walker, President of the Board of Trustees of Long Beach, and founder of Farmers and Merchants Bank

== See also ==
- List of cemeteries in California
