= R. Brownell McGrew =

American artist

Ralph Brownell McGrew (6 September 1916 – 17 June 1994) was an artist noted for his landscapes of the Western United States and portraits of Native American individuals. Navajo friends dubbed him "The Man Who Paints the Old."

== Early life and education ==
When he was eight-years-old, his family moved to Southern California, where he took art classes at Alhambra High School under Lester Bonar, a landscape painter in oil and watercolor. From 1936 to 1940 McGrew attended the Otis College of Art and Design in Los Angeles. He said Ralph Holmes, in particular, had a "profound and decisive influence" on him. "He taught entirely by principle; by creating a sort of ambient aesthetic," McGrew once wrote. "Never once in my years with him did he demonstrate or teach technique. It’s a slow way to learn, but if one’s patience and money hold out; probably the best."

== Career ==
McGrew spent the World War II years designing and drafting material for Firestone. He also made portraits of prominent Southern Californians as well as scenic backgrounds for motion picture studios including M.G.M. and Columbia. After falling in love with the deserts around Los Angeles, McGrew began to make painting trips through the Southwest. He once said that his end goal in painting was "to paint as well as he could, in order to communicate the infinite thrill and rapture of God’s creation."

In 1946, he was the first recipient of the John F. and Anna Lee Stacey Scholarship Fund, which let him focus on landscapes. McGrew lived for 17 years in New Mexico and from 1978 until 1986 in Cottonwood, Arizona. For more than 30 years, McGrew traveled the back roads of the Hopi and Navajo reservations, to which he was introduced in the mid-1950s by the Western artist Jimmy Swinnerton. "The effect was somewhat like what must have happened when Degas saw his first ballet dancer," one biographer wrote.

McGrew’s paintings, some of which have realized tens of thousands of dollars at auction, are not literal depictions. "I am an Impressionist in the classical sense," he once said. "Reality comes from the suggested rather than from the detailed or the finished. My paintings are not exact copies of any of the scenes I see."

His favorite models were elderly men of character, such as depicted in "Navajo Man with Turquoise Headband". He called them "long hairs" – men who had lived full lives whose faces told the story of sun and perseverance. Unlike many artists of the day, he always paid his models for their time.

== Collections ==
- Eiteljorg Museum of American Indians and Western Art
- Gilcrease Museum
- National Cowboy and Western Heritage Museum
- Phoenix Art Museum
- Collection of Barry Goldwater
- Collection of Walter Bimson, founder of Valley National Bank of Arizona

== Awards and citations ==
- 1946, the first recipient of the John F. and Anna Lee Stacey Scholarship Fund
- 1982 Tucson Festival Artist of the Year
- Original member of the National Academy of Western Art in Oklahoma
- 1969-1994 member of Cowboy Artists of America Inc.

== Personal life ==
McGrew was born September 6, 1916, in Columbus, Ohio. His marriage to Barbara Ann Froning lasted from 1938 until his death from complications of cancer in Tucson.
