= Tomales Presbyterian Church and Cemetery =

Historic site in Marin County, California, US

- U.S. National Register of Historic Places
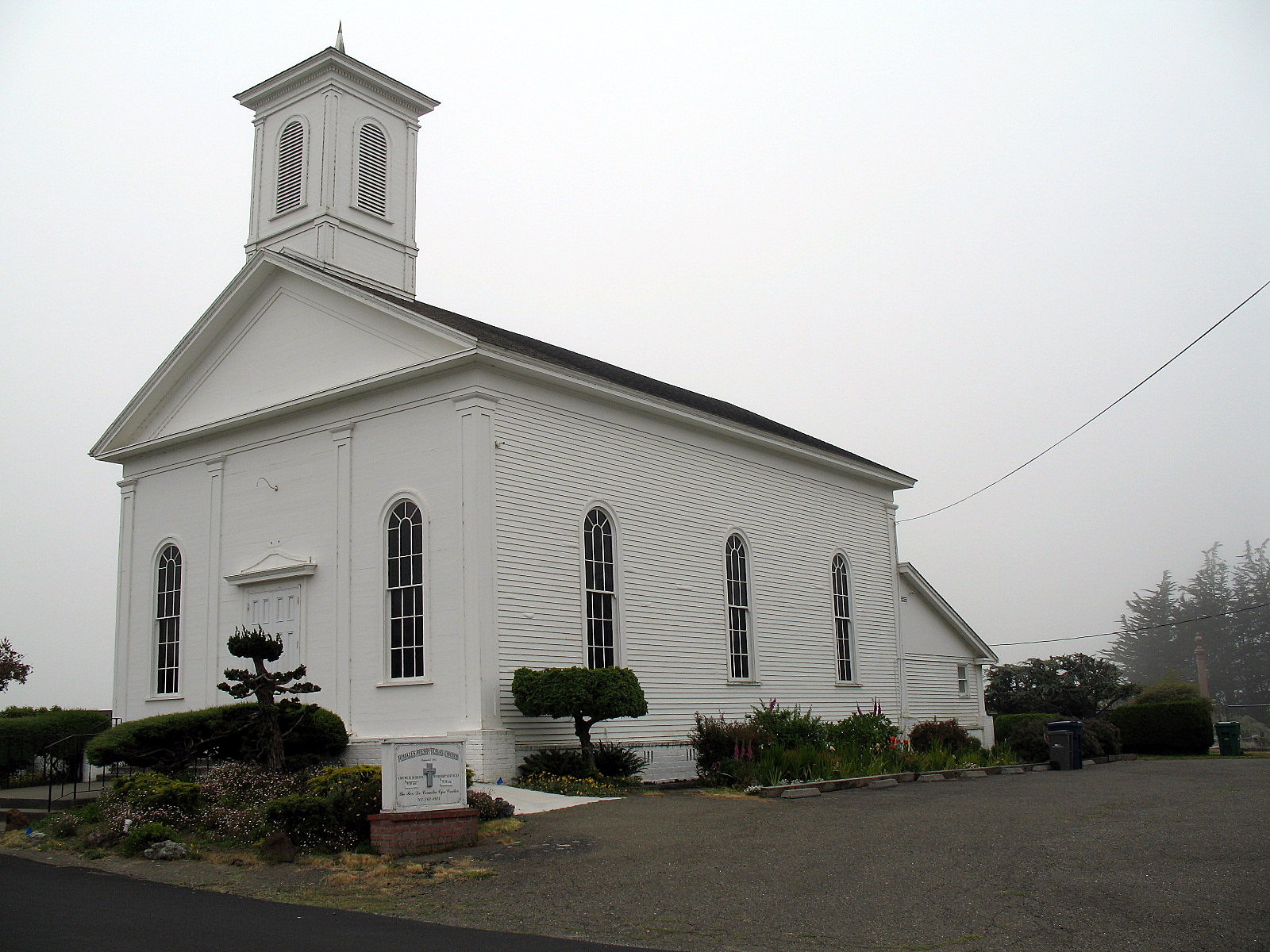

- Location within California Location within the United States
- Location: 11 Church Street, Tomales, California
- Coordinates: 38°14′44″N 122°54′26.7″W
- Area: 2 acres (0.81 ha)
- Built: 1864 (cemetery); 1868 (church)
- NRHP reference No.: 75000437
- Added to NRHP: August 1, 1975

The Tomales Presbyterian Church and Cemetery is located at 11 Church Street in Tomales, California, United States. It was listed on the National Register of Historic Places in 1975.

== History ==
The church was originally known as the Old School Presbyterian Church of Tomales. It is a historic Presbyterian church built in 1868. It is a simple white frame building, 53 by 35 feet (16 m × 11 m) in plan. It has a bell tower which rises more than 50 feet (15 m) and holds a church bell made by Rumsey and Company in Seneca Falls, New York.

The building replaced another which burned in a fire just before its planned dedication in 1866. It was the first Protestant church in Marin County. The present church survived the 1906 earthquake and two fires which destroyed many buildings in Tomales, and it is the oldest surviving Protestant church building in the county.

Its adjacent cemetery was opened in 1864, and was legally separate until deeded to the church in 1944; it was originally known as the Protestant Cemetery.

The church and cemetery were used in the 1995 film Village of the Damned.
