= Secret Ravine, California =

Coordinates: 38.8186°N 121.1244°W

Secret Ravine (also Auburn Station) is a former settlement in Placer County, California. Secret Ravine is located 3 miles (4.8 km) southwest of Newcastle. In 1854, the Secret Ravine Post Office is "near the Hawes Ranch." Elisha Hawes lived in Township 9, the 1860 census shows him continuing to receive mail at the Secret Ravine Post Office. Placer County records show that Elisha Hawes and his family sold the ranch in 1867, and that it was located on Secret Ravine near the intersection of what is now I-80 and Rocklin Road, in the area commonly called China Gardens.

== History ==
The Secret Ravine post office opened in 1854, changed its name to Auburn Station for a period in 1863 before changing back, and closed finally in 1868. Auburn Station was the Eastern Terminus of the Sacramento, Placer and Nevada Railroad, that town was active 1861 through 1863, at which time the railroad ceased to exist, the result being the Placer County Railroad War.

== Location ==
To find the site of Auburn Station today (as of 2013), go to the intersection of Auburn Folsom Road and Whiskey Bar Road. Proceed east 1/10 of a mile. Look to the left. The open ground is where the town used to be, according to the Placer County tax records.
