= Chung Wah Cemetery =

Historic cemetery in Folsom, California

- U.S. National Register of Historic Places
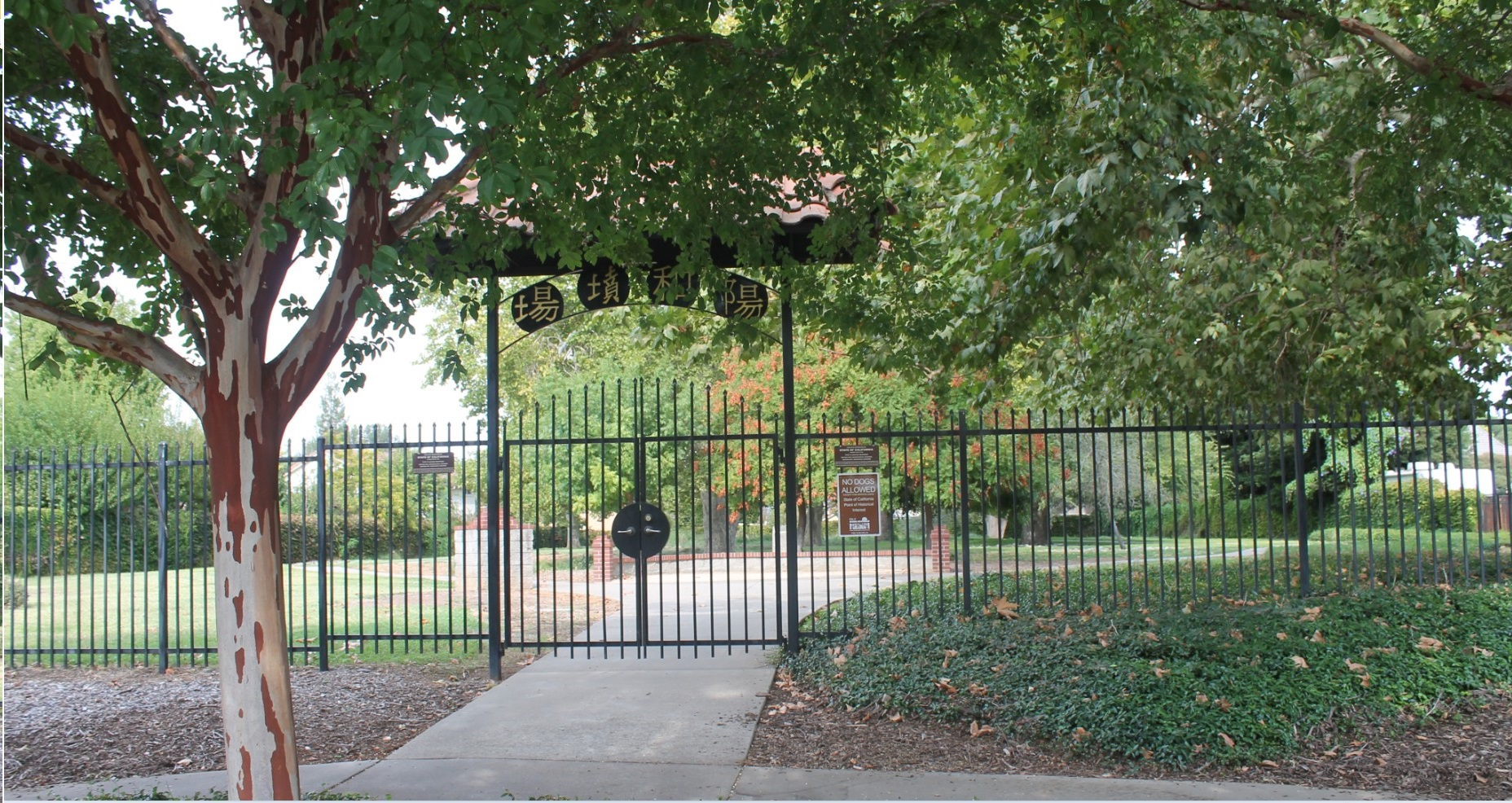
- Entrance to the cemetery

- Location within California Location within the United States
- Location: 1201 Forrest Street, Folsom, California
- Coordinates: 38°40′24″N 121°11′01″W
- Area: 2.6 acres (1.1 ha)
- Built: 1906
- Architectural style: Shrine/vault
- NRHP reference No.: 95000999
- Added to NRHP: August 21, 1995

The Chung Wah Cemetery, also known as China Mission-Chung Wah Chinese Cemetery, in Folsom, California is a cemetery from 1906.

The city of Folsom had a thriving Chinese community of about 3,000 that was drawn by the gold mining in the area. The size and shape of the cemetery suggests that it was not planned well. Graves were reportedly dug wherever there was room, with no specific orientation or layout. The Chung Wah cemetery served Chinese immigrants of the Heungshan dialect while another local cemetery, Yeong Wo was built by people from the Chungshan district. It was listed on the National Register of Historic Places in 1995.

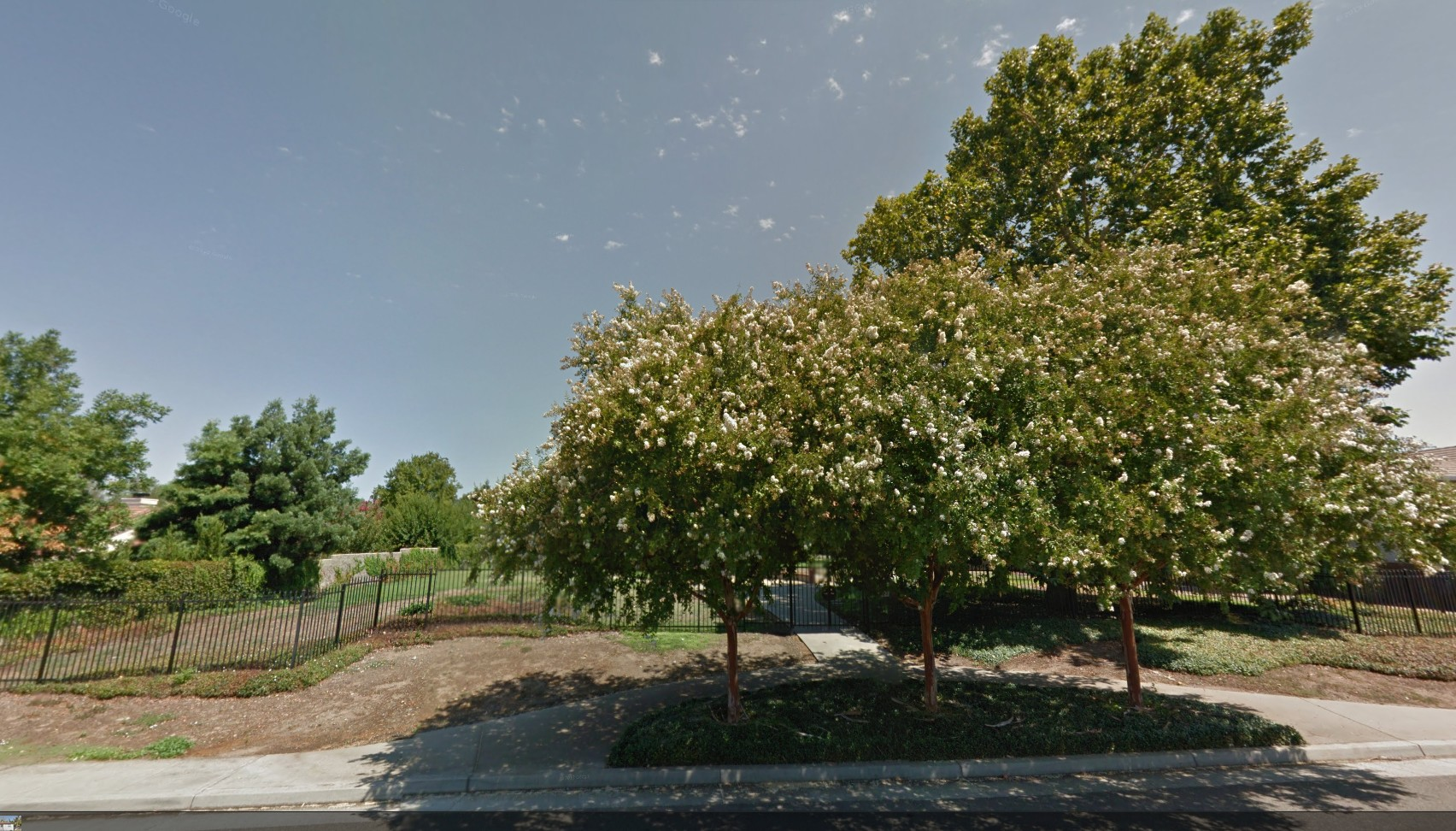
Chung Wah Cemetery
