= Outside Lands =

Area of western San Francisco

Coordinates: 37°46′7.25″N 122°28′53.74″W

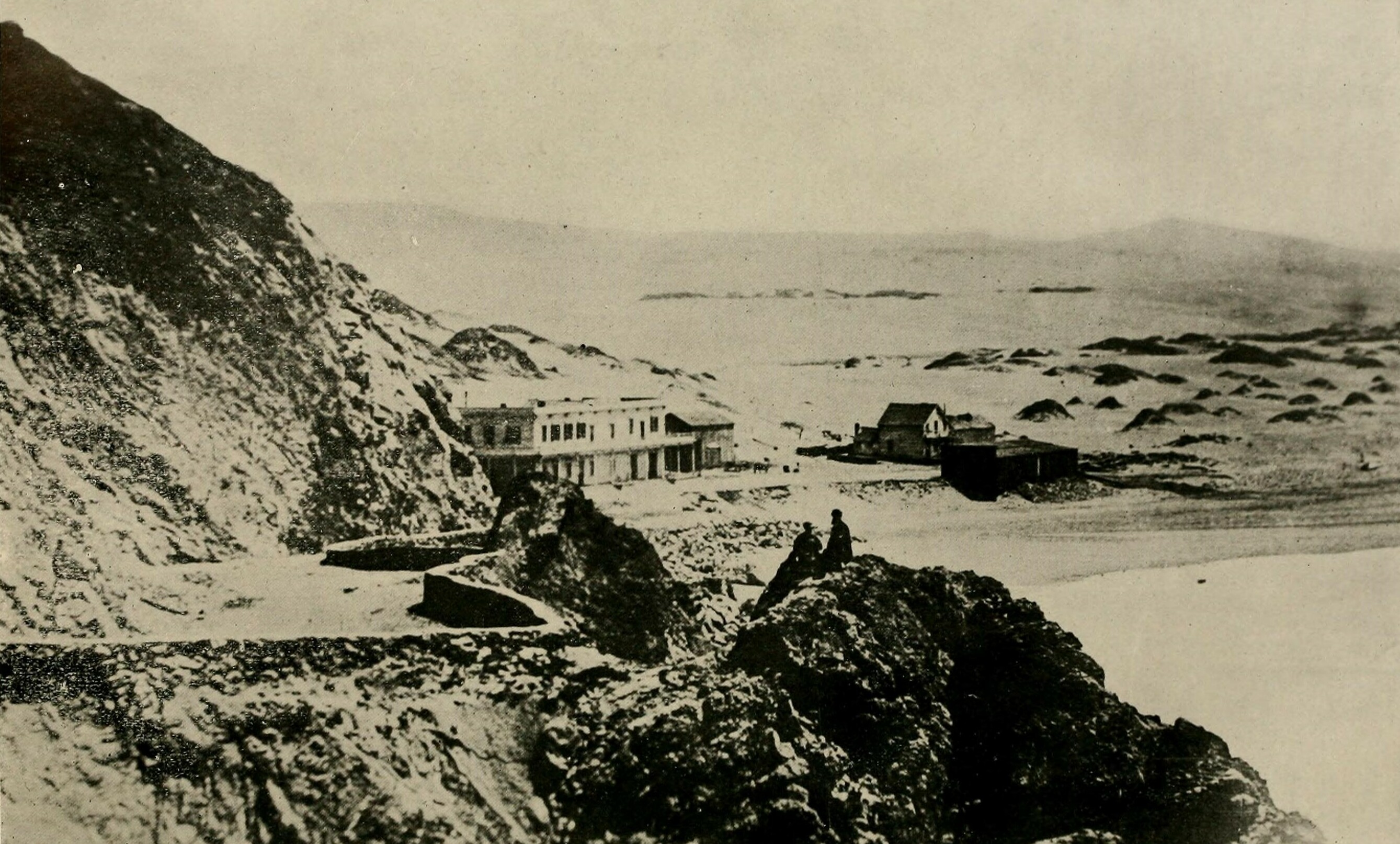
“The sand dunes of Golden Gate Park before they were converted into a garden; view from the old Seal Rock House, taken in 1865”

Outside Lands was the name used in the 19th century for the present-day Richmond District and Sunset District on the West Side of San Francisco. With few roads and no public transportation, the area was covered by sand dunes and was considered inaccessible and uninhabitable. Today, after extensive development, the area consists of Golden Gate Park, Ocean Beach, and well-developed neighborhoods.

== History ==
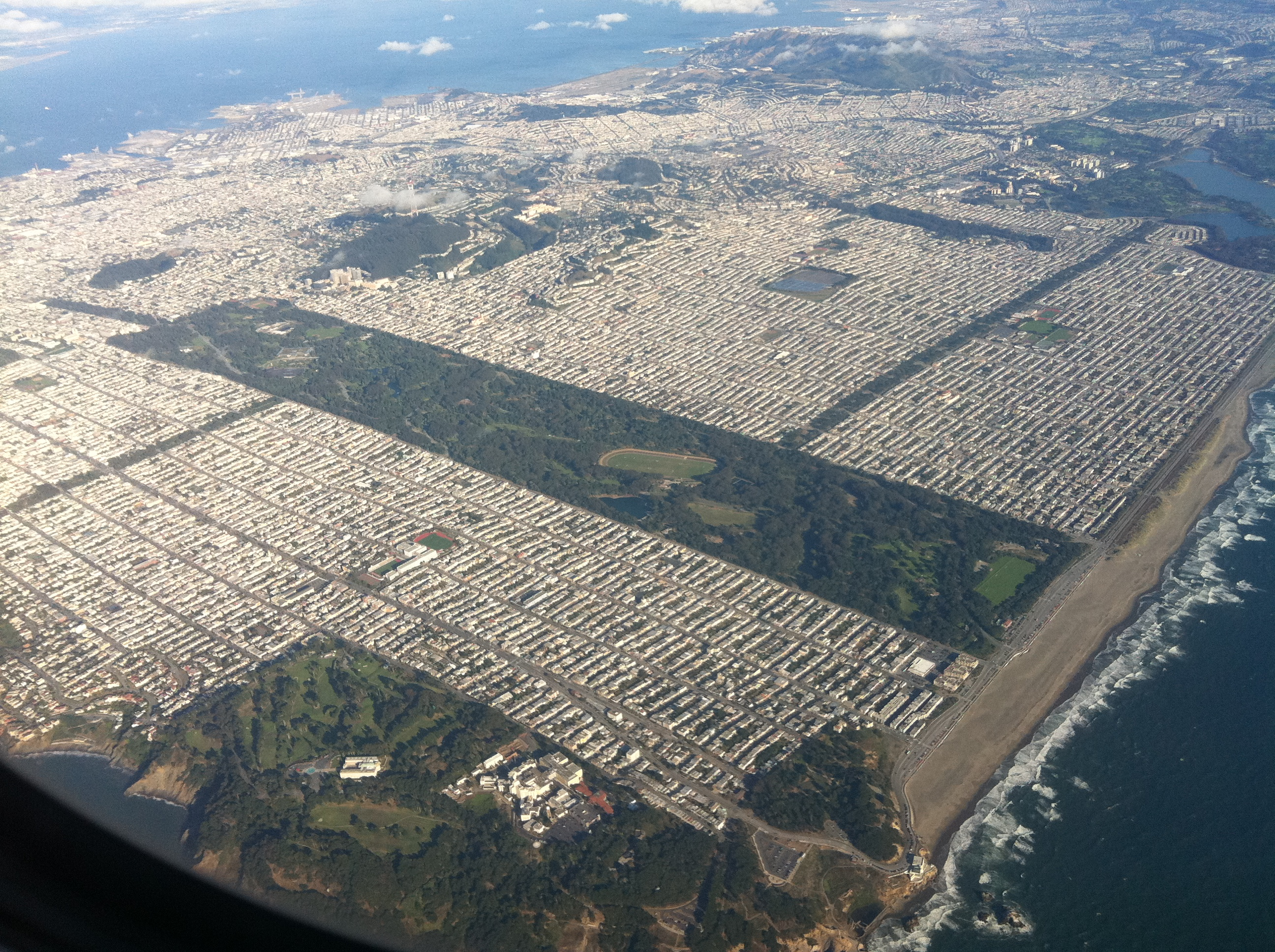
The Outside Lands in 2011 shown from the northwest, with Lands End and the Richmond District in the foreground, then Golden Gate Park (the rectangle) and the Sunset District at center-right

Like all of California, the Outside Lands were a Mexican possession until the Treaty of Guadalupe Hidalgo in February 1848 ceded it to the United States. The area was U.S. government land at the time of the gold rush. The City and County of San Francisco, which was growing rapidly, desired the land and petitioned for it in the 1850s. After years of court battles, on March 8, 1866, Congress passed an Act ending the litigation and settling the title to the Outside Lands against the claims of squatters. During the course of lengthy litigation over the Outside Lands, local politicians, led by Frank McCoppin, and residents of San Francisco, rallied for the establishment of a public park in the western quarter of the city. Mayor Henry P. Coon worked with a three-member special committee of the Board of Supervisors, which had surveys and maps made of all the Outside Lands, at a cost of $12,000. Their report recommending subdivision into blocks and a reservation for a park was submitted to the Board on May 18, 1866. Suitable portions were also to be set aside for public squares, fire-engine house lots, school lots and hospitals. The committee also proposed an arrangement whereby squatters could donate a portion of their claims for a public park in return for clear title to the remainder of their lands. The proposal won Supervisor McCoppin the Mayor’s office, and gained the approval of the state legislature.

== Creation of Golden Gate Park ==
On April 4, 1870, the state legislature passed “An Act to provide for the improvement of Public Parks in the City of San Francisco” Soon after, the newly formed park commission advertised bonds to fund park improvements. Enough bonds were sold to finance a topographical survey of Golden Gate Park and its approach. Surveyor and engineer William Hammond Hall won the contract to survey park land, completed his report on February 15, 1871, and in August of the same year, was appointed as engineer of the park. Initial work completed in 1871 included grading, fencing, drainage and irrigation work, and development of a park nursery. In 1872, 22,000 hardy and quick-growing trees were planted, park roads were built, and visitors began to arrive by the thousands.

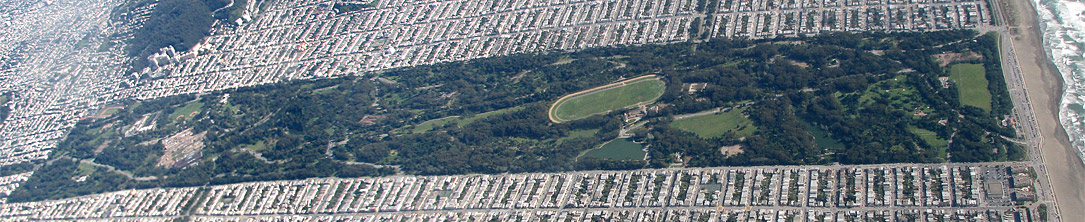
Aerial view of today's Golden Gate Park, which was once known as the Outside Lands
