= James Van Ness =

7th mayor of San Francisco, from 1855 to 1856

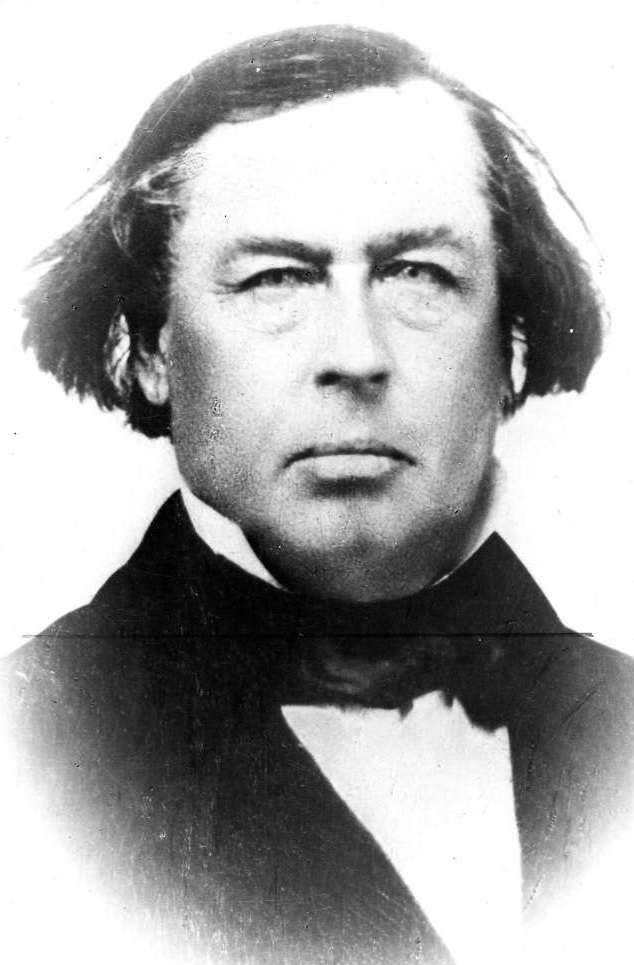

7th Mayor of San Francisco
- In office July 1, 1855 – July 7, 1856
- Preceded by: Stephen Palfrey Webb
- Succeeded by: George Whelan

Personal details
- Born: 1808 Burlington, Vermont
- Died: December 28, 1872 San Luis Obispo, California
- Party: Democratic Party
- Spouse: Caroline Frances James Lesley (m. 1836; died 1858)
- Children: 2
- Parent(s): Cornelius P. Van Ness; Rhoda Savage
- Relatives: John P. Van Ness (uncle); William P. Van Ness (uncle)
- Education: University of Vermont (BA, MA)

James Van Ness (1808 – December 28, 1872) was an American politician who served as the 7th mayor of San Francisco from 1855 to 1856.

== Early life and education ==
James Van Ness was born in Burlington, Vermont, in 1808. He was the son of Dutch-American Cornelius P. Van Ness (1782–1852), who served as governor of Vermont; and Rhoda Savage (d. 1834), his first wife. He was the nephew of U.S. Representative John Peter Van Ness and William Peter Van Ness, a federal judge.

Van Ness attended Norwich University and graduated from the University of Vermont, receiving a Bachelor of Arts degree (1825) and a Master of Arts (1831). He later studied law and became an attorney, practicing in Vermont and Georgia before relocating to California.

== Career ==
As a San Francisco alderman, he sponsored the "Van Ness Ordinance", which ordered all land within the city limits that was undeveloped at that time (that is, west of Larkin Street and southwest of Ninth Street) to be surveyed and transferred to their original deedholders. Because there were many fraudulent deedholders at that time, this law led to many lawsuits for many years.

In 1855, Van Ness was elected mayor as a Democrat. However, his administration proved ineffectual in the face of three major crises that arose. First, his election was called into question following allegations of irregularities in the outcome. Then, on November 18, 1855, Charles Cora fatally shot U.S. Marshal William H. Richardson. Cora sought the safety of the sheriff at the city jail, and Van Ness pleaded with the mob that had surrounded the jail to disperse. Another high-profile murder occurred on May 14, 1856, when James P. Casey shot newspaper editor James King of William after King wrote an unfavorable article about Casey. After King died on May 20, the Vigilantes reformed, tried Cora and Casey, and convicted them of murder.

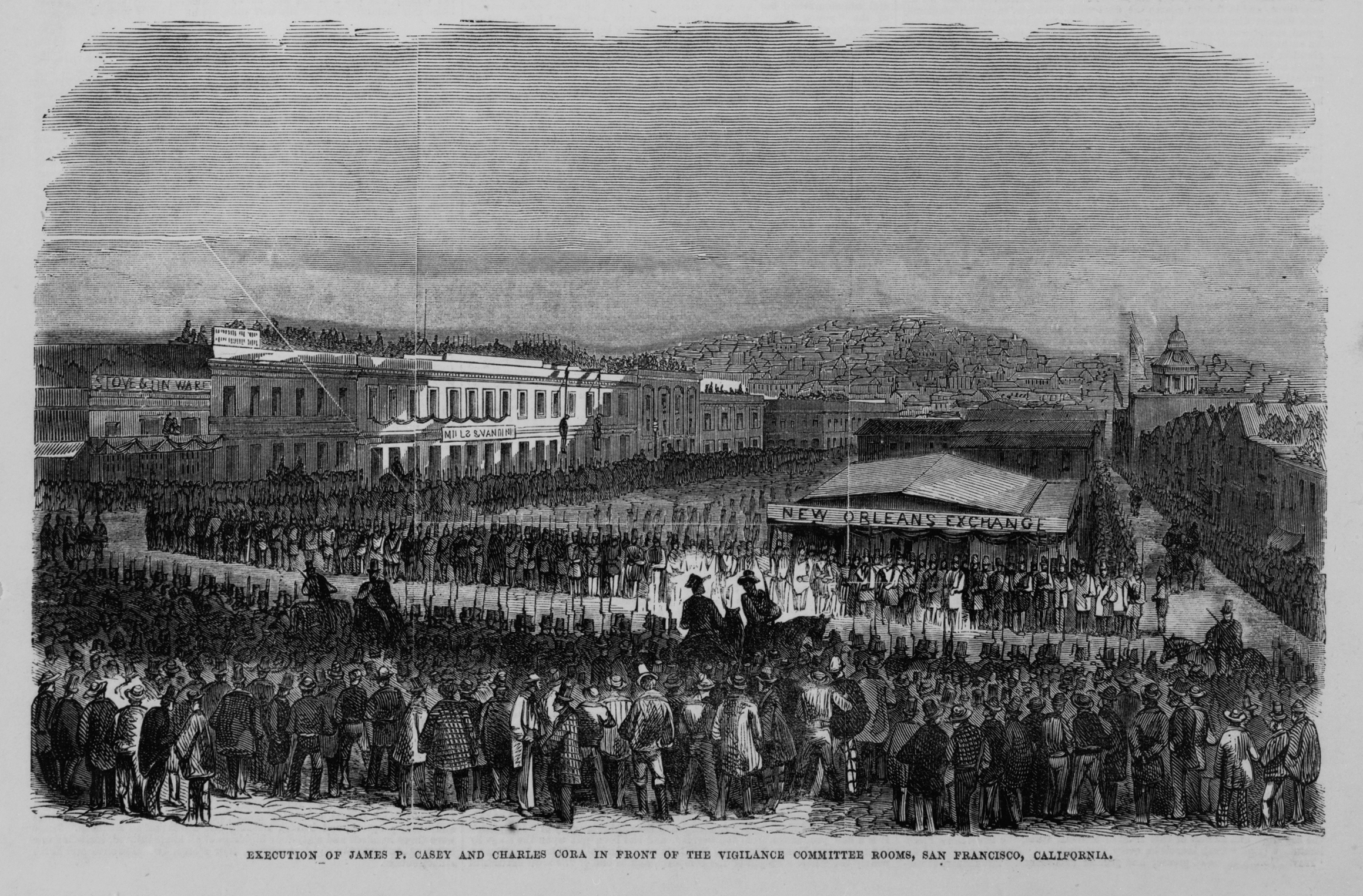
The hanging of Cora and Casey

Van Ness tried in vain to have California Governor J. Neely Johnson send state militia forces into the city to stop the executions. Ultimately, he watched helplessly as the Vigilantes executed Cora and Casey.

Van Ness left office in July under the terms of the Consolidation Act (passed by the state legislature on April 29, 1856), which provided for the merger of the city and county governments into one unit. The Van Ness Ordinance was the first step in the formation of the Western Addition district.

Van Ness would be the last mayor to be referred to as such during his term until 1862. Until then, the mayor would be known as the "president of the board of supervisors"

In 1860, he moved to San Luis Obispo County to practice law and, in 1871, became a state senator.

== Personal life ==
In January 1836, Van Ness married Caroline Frances James Lesley (1808–1858). Together, they had two children:

- Eliza Bird Van Ness (1838–1901), who married Frank McCoppin (1834–1897), an Irish-born San Francisco mayor
- Thomas Casey "T.C." Van Ness

Van Ness died on December 28, 1872, in San Luis Obispo, California.

=== Honors ===
Van Ness Avenue is named in his honor, as are streets in Santa Cruz, Los Angeles, and Fresno.
