= Ephraim Willard Burr =

American banker and politician (1809–1894)

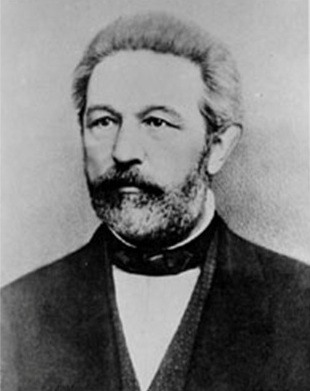

9th Mayor of San Francisco
- In office November 15, 1856 – 1859
- Preceded by: George J. Whelan
- Succeeded by: Henry F. Teschemacher

Personal details
- Born: March 7, 1809 Warren, Rhode Island, U.S.
- Died: July 20, 1894 (aged 85) San Francisco, California, U.S.
- Party: People's Party
- Relations: Alice Burr (granddaughter)

Ephraim Willard Burr (1809–1894) was an American businessman, banker and politician. He served as the first elected President of Board of Supervisors of the City and County of San Francisco, California, from 1856 to 1859.

== Early life ==
Burr was born on March 7, 1809, in Warren, Rhode Island. He was a Protestant.

As a young man, he worked for a whaling company which sent him west. After losing his crew while docked in San Francisco—many sailors were lured away by the prospect of finding gold during the Gold Rush—Burr stayed put and opened a grocery store. His family moved to California to be with him.

The venture proved so successful that he opened California's first savings union, the San Francisco Accumulating Fund Association.

== Politics ==
He entered politics in 1855 when he petitioned the San Francisco Common Council to curb open-stream pollution caused by local slaughterhouses. Burr stated that the pollution caused cholera to enter the streams, causing three deaths—including that of his son.

=== Mayor of San Francisco ===
Burr was soon noticed by the Vigilante movement, who recommended him as the People's Party candidate for mayor. He was elected mayor on November 4, 1856, and took office on November 15 of that year. The Consolidated Act of 1856 had recently passed, where San Francisco merged the city and county government. Burr entered office under this new city charter, that significantly weakened his powers. However, this restriction did not stop him from cutting city spending. Nor did this loss of authority stop Burr from reforming the Office of City Treasurer; he changed the salary from a percentage of the city receipts to a fixed wage to stop graft.

He also proposed a plan to make the San Francisco Board of Supervisors overlords of the city debt, and to make the city attorney the overseer of the city's legal matters, which were previously handled by outside attorneys.

== Retirement ==
After leaving office, Burr devoted himself to business interests. His primary one was the Savings and Loan Society, which he became president of 1857, while he was mayor. He was also president of the San Francisco Fire Insurance Company from 1861 to 1866.

== Final appearance and death ==
He would make his final public appearance in 1891 when the Board of Supervisors sought to extend Van Ness Avenue to the San Francisco Bay. He wanted to stop the expansion since the extended route went through his property.

He died in San Francisco on July 20, 1894. His estate was valued at six million dollars.

== Legacy ==
Burr had loaned $30,000 to build the now-famous San Francisco cable car system, before retiring in 1879. He also built the Burr Mansion in 1875 for his son, which is a San Francisco Designated Landmark and listed on the National Register of Historic Places.

Allyne Park located at corner of Green Street and Gough Street (next to the McElroy Octagon House) in San Francisco, was named for the house owned by oil magnate John Winslow Allyne and his wife Mary Newell Allyne (née Burr), who was Burr's daughter. Around 1963, the Allyne house was donated to the city which tore down the house and created the park.

== Sources ==
- Heintz, William F., San Francisco's Mayors: 1850-1880. From the Gold Rush to the Silver Bonanza. Woodside, CA: Gilbert Roberts Publications, 1975. (Library of Congress Card No. 75-17094)
