= George J. Whelan =

American politician

8th Mayor of San Francisco
- In office July 8, 1856 – November 14, 1856
- Preceded by: James Van Ness
- Succeeded by: Ephraim Willard Burr

Personal details
- Profession: Lawyer, politician

George J. Whelan (fl. 1856) was an American politician and lawyer. He served as the Mayor of San Francisco in from July 8 to November 15, 1856. He was chosen mayor by justices of the peace who were acting as the County Board of Supervisors. His brief term was marred by the vigilance movement, Chinese immigration issues, collecting back taxes from the city's most prominent citizens of the day, and uncooperative elected officials. His last act as mayor was to give a farewell address in which members of the soon-to-be-inaugurated Burr administration refused to attend.

During his term, the San Francisco City and County governments merged into one unit. He would later return to practicing law.

== San Francisco's least-documented mayor ==
Whelan was the least-documented person ever to hold the office. No photographs or drawings of him are known to exist today. His name does not appear in any San Francisco city directories after 1860. For many years afterwards, many official listings of San Francisco officeholders refused to even acknowledge him as a former mayor. For example, the 1862–1863 volume of San Francisco's Municipal Reports list James Van Ness' successor as E.W. Burr – with an asterisk after Burr's name. In another example, Oscar Shuck's official listing of all San Francisco city officeholders up to 1894 mentions Whelan as once being president of the County Board of Supervisors – but not as mayor.

== San Francisco District Attorney ==
Whelan had served as District Attorney for San Francisco County.

== Sources ==
- Heintz, William F., San Francisco's Mayors: 1850–1880. From the Gold Rush to the Silver Bonanza. Woodside, CA: Gilbert Roberts Publications, 1975. (Library of Congress Card No. 75-17094)
