= Alice Burr =

American photographer (1883–1968)

- Born: 1883
- Died: 1968 (aged 84–85)
- Education: San Francisco Art Institute
- Style: Photography
- Movement: Pictorialism
- Relatives: Ephraim Willard Burr (grandfather)

Alice Burr (1883–1968) was an American photographer associated with the pictorialist movement. She was San Francisco-based.

== Early life and education ==
Alice Burr was born in 1883. Her grandfather was Ephraim Willard Burr, former mayor of San Francisco. She lived in the Burr family home, the Burr Mansion on 1772 Vallejo Street in Cow Hollow, San Francisco until her death. Her studio, an Arts and Crafts-style structure built in 1916 solely for her use, was located on an adjacent property.

In 1916, Burr studied at the Clarence Hudson White School of Photography in New York with White himself, whose 30-week course of study emphasized personal vision and style over any particular school or movement. Burr also attended the California School of Design (now San Francisco Art Institute), where she studied a range of studio arts, including painting, drawing, and printmaking, but it is not known whether she pursued this training prior to her course of study in New York.

In the 1920s and 1930s, Burr, her youngest sister Marian, and two female cousins traveled extensively across Europe, Asia, African continents and to Australia and Japan together.

== Work ==
Burr primarily made portraits and images of nature, and additionally captured scenes around San Francisco and during her many travels abroad. In her home studio, she experimented with the bromoil and autochrome processes.

== Recognition ==
In her application to join the San Francisco Society of Women Artists (SFSWA; founded 1877), one of the oldest arts organizations in California, Burr noted that she had exhibited student work at the De Young Museum and at the San Diego Museum of Art.

In 1927, Burr was elected president of the California League of Women Voters.

Burr's accomplishments as a photographer were examined in the 1998 exhibition Alice Burr: A California Pictorialist Rediscovered held at the Davison Art Center at Wesleyan University, curated by Thomas Weston Fels with support from Jeanne Slate Overstreet and her late husband Alan Burr Overstreet, the artist's nephew. The exhibition, which traveled to the Albin O. Kuhn Library & Gallery at University of Maryland (2001), California Historical Society (2005) and Santa Barbara Museum of Art (2006), was accompanied by a catalog.

== Collections ==
Burr's work is held in the following permanent collections:

- Clark Art Institute, Williamstown, Massachusetts (four photographs)
- Fine Arts Museums of San Francisco, San Francisco, California
- California Historical Society, San Francisco, California
