= Mayor of San Francisco =

Chief executive of San Francisco, California, US

Mayor of the City and County of San Francisco
- Seal of San Francisco

- Flag of San Francisco

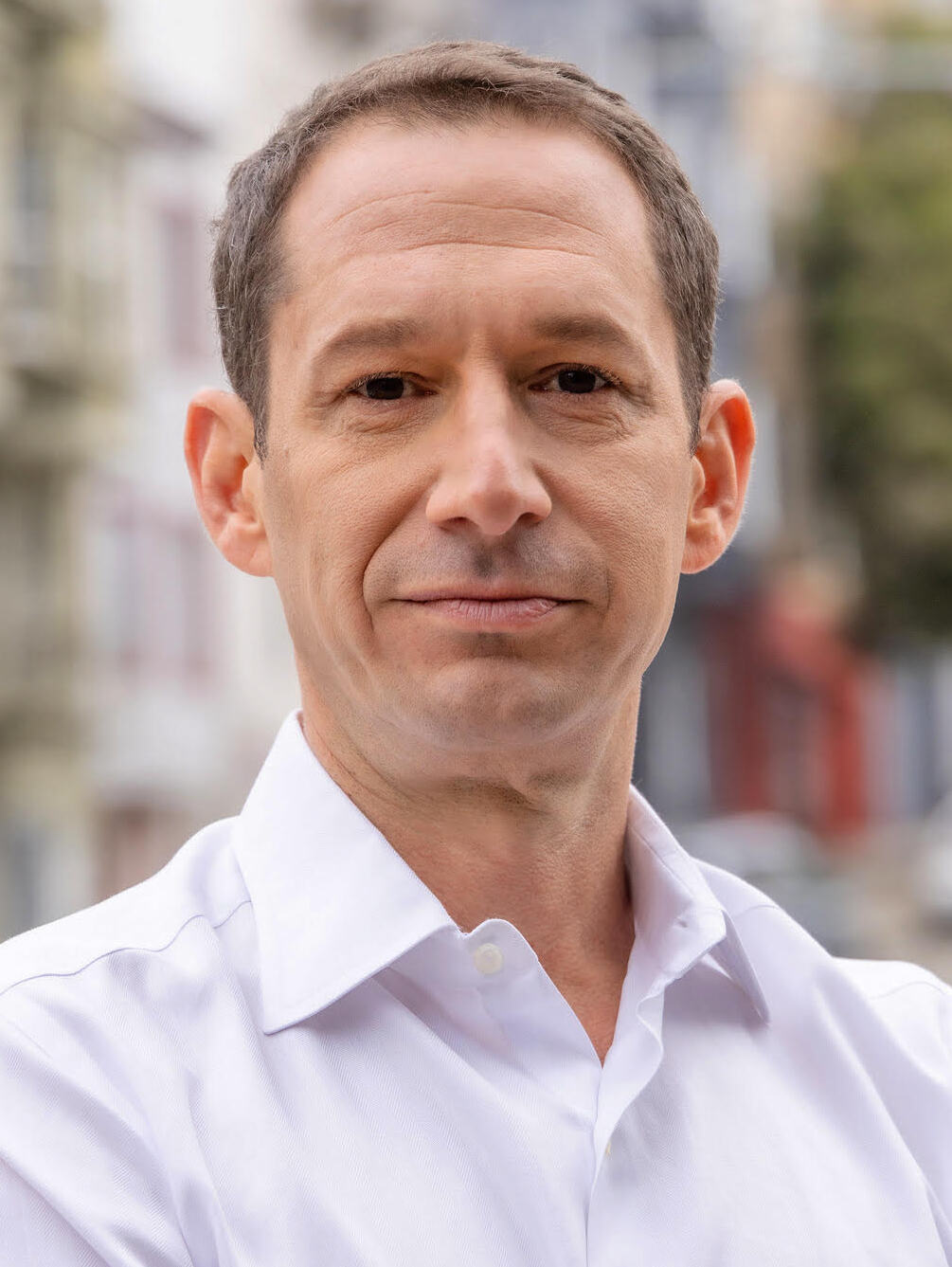
- Incumbent; Daniel Lurie since January 8, 2025
- Government of San Francisco
- Style: His Honor; Mr. Mayor
- Residence: No official residence
- Term length: Four years, renewable once
- Inaugural holder: John W. Geary
- Formation: 1850
- Salary: $1
- Website: Office of the Mayor

The mayor of the City and County of San Francisco is the head of the executive branch of the San Francisco city and county government. The officeholder has the duty to enforce city laws, and the power to either approve or veto bills passed by the San Francisco Board of Supervisors, the legislative branch. The mayor serves a four-year term and is limited to two successive terms. Because of San Francisco's status as a consolidated city-county, the mayor also serves as the head of government of the county; both entities have been governed together by a combined set of governing bodies since 1856.

There have been 45 individuals who have served as mayor in San Francisco since 1850, when California became a state following the American Conquest of California. Prior to the conquest, Californios served as Mayor of San Francisco during the Spanish and Mexican eras since 1779.

The current mayor is Democrat Daniel Lurie.

== Elections ==
The mayor of San Francisco is elected every four years; until 2019 elections took place one year before United States presidential elections on election day in November. Candidates must live and be registered to vote in San Francisco at the time of the election. The mayor is usually sworn in on the January 8 following the election.

The most recent election for a full mayoral term occurred in 2024. In 2022, San Francisco voters passed Proposition H, which changed mayoral elections to the same cycle as presidential elections. This gave London Breed an additional year to her one full term. This change was proposed because of the low turnout in off-year elections. For example, 2019 saw a turnout of only 42%, while 2020 saw 86% turnout.

Under the California constitution, all city elections in the state are conducted on a non-partisan basis. As a result, candidates' party affiliations are not listed on the ballot, and multiple candidates from a single party can run in the election.

Mayoral elections were originally run under a two-round system. If no candidate received a simple majority of votes in the general election, the two candidates who received the most votes competed in a second runoff election held several weeks later. In 2002, the election system for city officials was overhauled as a result of a citywide referendum. The new system, known as instant-runoff voting, allows voters to select and rank three candidates based on their preferences. If no one wins more than half of the first-choice votes, the candidate with the fewest votes is eliminated and second-choice votes (and third-choice votes, if necessary) are counted until a candidate captures the majority. This eliminates the need to hold a separate runoff election and saves money. This was first implemented in the 2004 Board of Supervisors election after two years of preparation. In 2007, the new system was implemented in the mayoral election for the first time.

== Salary and benefits ==
As of 2024, the mayor is paid an annual salary of $364,582, the highest mayoral salary in the United States. Nine city public employees earned higher salaries than the mayor, including the chief investment officer and the managing director of the San Francisco Employees' Retirement System, who oversee the city's pension plan. Current mayor Daniel Lurie decided to return all but $1 of his annual salary back to San Francisco.

Unlike a few other American cities, the San Francisco mayor does not have an official residence; in the 1990s, Mayor Willie Brown unsuccessfully pushed to acquire the Yerba Buena Island mansion formerly used by U.S. Navy admirals as a ceremonial residence for the mayor.

== Duties and powers ==
The mayor has the responsibility to enforce all city laws, administer and coordinate city departments and intergovernmental activities, set forth policies and agendas to the Board of Supervisors, and prepare and submit the city budget at the end of each fiscal year. The mayor has the powers to either approve or veto bills passed by the San Francisco Board of Supervisors, participate in meetings of the Board of Supervisors and its committees, appoint a replacement to fill vacancies in all city elected offices until elections, appoint a member of the Board to serve as acting mayor in the absence of the mayor, and to direct personnel in the case of emergency.

== Succession ==
When mayors die in office, resign, or are unable to carry out their duties, and did not designate an acting mayor, the president of the Board of Supervisors becomes acting mayor until the full Board selects a person to fill the vacancy and finish the previous mayoral term. In the case that both the president of the Board of Supervisors and the mayor are incapacitated, the order of succession is followed. This has happened seven times: James Otis died in office and was succeeded by George Hewston; Eugene Schmitz was removed and succeeded by Charles Boxton; Boxton resigned and was succeeded by Edward Robeson Taylor; James Rolph resigned and was succeeded by Angelo Rossi; George Moscone was assassinated and was succeeded by Dianne Feinstein; Gavin Newsom resigned and was succeeded by Ed Lee; and Lee died in office and was succeeded by London Breed before the San Francisco Board of Supervisors selected Mark Farrell as interim mayor.

== List of mayors ==
To date, 45 individuals have served as San Francisco mayor. There have been 46 mayoralties due to Charles James Brenham's serving two non-consecutive terms: he is counted chronologically as both the second and fourth mayor. The longest term was that of James Rolph, who served over 18 years until his resignation to become the California governor. The length of his tenure as mayor was largely due to his popularity. During his term, San Francisco saw the expansion of its transit system, the construction of the Civic Center and the hosting of the World's Fair. The shortest term was that of Charles Boxton, who served only eight days before resigning from office. Three mayors have died in office: Otis died from illness, Moscone was assassinated in 1978, and Lee died from cardiac arrest. Dianne Feinstein and London Breed are the only women who have served as mayor, both of them by succession and by election; Willie Brown and London Breed are the only African Americans to serve to date; Ed Lee is the only Asian American to serve as mayor. Four mayors have Jewish ancestry: Washington Bartlett (Sephardi), Adolph Sutro (Ashkenazi), Dianne Feinstein (Ashkenazi), and Daniel Lurie. Fourteen mayors are native San Franciscans: Levi Richard Ellert, James D. Phelan, Eugene Schmitz, James Rolph, Elmer Robinson, John F. Shelley, Joseph Alioto, George Moscone, Dianne Feinstein, Frank Jordan, Gavin Newsom, Mark Farrell, London Breed, and Daniel Lurie. Four mayors are foreign-born: Frank McCoppin and P.H. McCarthy (United Kingdom of Great Britain and Ireland, both born in what is now the Republic of Ireland), Adolph Sutro (Prussia, part of Germany since 1871) and George Christopher (Greece).

Willie Brown is the first black mayor of San Francisco. London Breed is the first black female mayor. Breed was a District 5 supervisor and president of the Board of Supervisors, who won a special election following the death of Mayor Ed Lee on December 12, 2017. Breed served out the remainder of Lee's uncompleted term (until January 8, 2020), after which she was eligible to run for two full terms of her own. She won the 2019 San Francisco mayoral election but lost the 2024 San Francisco mayoral election.

This list does not include acting mayors who are typically appointed whenever the mayor will be out of the city.

| No. | Mayor | | Took office | Left office | Tenure | Party | Election |
|---|---|---|---|---|---|---|---|
| 1 | | John W. Geary (1819–1873) | May 1, 1850 | May 4, 1851 | 1 year, 3 days | Independent | TBA |
| 2 | | Charles James Brenham (1817–1876); 1st time | May 5, 1851 | December 31, 1851 | 240 days | Whig | TBA |
| 3 | | Stephen Randall Harris (1802–1879) | January 1, 1852 | November 9, 1852 | 313 days | Democratic | TBA |
| 4 | | Charles James Brenham (1817–1876); 2nd time | November 10, 1852 | October 2, 1853 | 326 days | Whig | TBA |
| 5 | | C. K. Garrison (1809–1885) | October 3, 1853 | October 1, 1854 | 363 days | Whig | TBA |
| 6 | Undated photograph of Stephen Palfrey Webb (1804–1879) | Stephen Palfrey Webb (1804–1879) | October 2, 1854 | June 30, 1855 | 271 days | Native American | TBA |
| 7 | | James Van Ness (1808–1872) | July 1, 1855 | July 7, 1856 | 1 year, 6 days | Democratic | TBA |
| 8 | | George J. Whelan (TBA–TBA) | July 8, 1856 | November 14, 1856 | 129 days | American | TBA |
| 9 | | Ephraim Willard Burr (1809–1894) | November 15, 1856 | October 2, 1859 | 2 years, 321 days | American | TBA |
| 10 | | Henry F. Teschemacher (1823–1904) | October 3, 1859 | June 30, 1863 | 3 years, 270 days | People's | TBA |
| 11 | | Henry Perrin Coon (1822–1884) | July 1, 1863 | December 1, 1867 | 4 years, 153 days | People's | TBA |
| 12 | | Frank McCoppin (1834–1897) | December 2, 1867 | December 5, 1869 | 2 years, 3 days | Democratic | TBA |
| 13 | | Thomas Henry Selby (1820–1875) | December 6, 1869 | December 3, 1871 | 1 year, 362 days | Republican | TBA |
| 14 | | William Alvord (1833–1904) | December 4, 1871 | November 30, 1873 | 1 year, 361 days | Republican | TBA |
| 15 | | James Otis (1826–1875) | December 1, 1873 | October 30, 1875 (Note: Died in office.) | 1 year, 333 days | People's | TBA |
| Vacant | | | October 30, 1875 | November 4, 1875 | | | |
| 16 | | George Hewston (1826–1891) | November 4, 1875 (Note: Hewston was appointed mayor by the San Francisco Board of Supervisors after Otis's death.) | December 5, 1875 | 31 days | People's | App. |
| 17 | | Andrew Jackson Bryant (1831–1888) | December 6, 1875 | November 30, 1879 | 3 years, 359 days | Democratic | TBA |
| 18 | | Isaac Smith Kalloch (1832–1887) | December 1, 1879 | December 4, 1881 | 2 years, 3 days | Workingmen's | TBA |
| 19 | | Maurice Carey Blake (1815–1897) | December 5, 1881 | January 7, 1883 | 1 year, 33 days | Republican | TBA |
| 20 | | Washington Bartlett (1824–1887) | January 8, 1883 | January 2, 1887 | 3 years, 359 days | Democratic | TBA |
| 21 | | Edward B. Pond (1833–1910) | January 3, 1887 | January 4, 1891 | 4 years, 1 day | Democratic | TBA |
| 22 | | George Henry Sanderson (1824–1893) | January 5, 1891 | January 3, 1893 | 1 year, 364 days | Republican | TBA |
| 23 | | Levi Richard Ellert (1857–1901) | January 3, 1893 | January 6, 1895 | 2 years, 3 days | Republican | TBA |
| 24 | | Adolph Sutro (1830–1898) | January 7, 1895 | January 3, 1897 | 1 year, 362 days | Populist | TBA |
| 25 | | James D. Phelan (1861–1930) | January 4, 1897 | January 7, 1902 | 5 years, 3 days | Democratic | 1896 |
| 25 | | James D. Phelan (1861–1930) | January 4, 1897 | January 7, 1902 | 5 years, 3 days | Democratic | 1898 |
| 25 | | James D. Phelan (1861–1930) | January 4, 1897 | January 7, 1902 | 5 years, 3 days | Democratic | 1899 |
| 26 | | Eugene Schmitz (1864–1928) | January 8, 1902 | July 8, 1907 (Note: Schmitz was found guilty for extortion and bribery and sentenced to five years in prison. The office of mayor was declared vacant while he was imprisoned.) | 5 years, 181 days | Union Labor | 1901 |
| 26 | | Eugene Schmitz (1864–1928) | January 8, 1902 | July 8, 1907 | 5 years, 181 days | Union Labor | 1903 |
| 26 | | Eugene Schmitz (1864–1928) | January 8, 1902 | July 8, 1907 | 5 years, 181 days | Union Labor | 1905 |
| 27 | | Charles Boxton (1860–1927) | July 9, 1907 (Note: Boxton was appointed mayor by the San Francisco Board of Supervisors after Schmitz was imprisoned.) | July 16, 1907 (Note: Boxton resigned due to having taken bribes.) | 7 days | Union Labor | App. |
| 28 | | Edward Robeson Taylor (1838–1923) | July 16, 1907 (Note: Taylor was appointed mayor by the San Francisco Board of Supervisors after Boxton resigned.) | January 7, 1910 | 2 years, 175 days | Democratic | App. |
| 28 | | Edward Robeson Taylor (1838–1923) | July 16, 1907 | January 7, 1910 | 2 years, 175 days | Democratic | 1907 |
| 29 | | P. H. McCarthy (1863–1933) | January 8, 1910 | January 7, 1912 | 1 year, 364 days | Union Labor | 1909 |
| 30 | | James Rolph (1869–1934) | January 8, 1912 | January 6, 1931 (Note: Rolph resigned to become Governor of California.) | 18 years, 363 days | Republican | 1911 |
| 30 | | James Rolph (1869–1934) | January 8, 1912 | January 6, 1931 | 18 years, 363 days | Republican | 1915 |
| 30 | | James Rolph (1869–1934) | January 8, 1912 | January 6, 1931 | 18 years, 363 days | Republican | 1919 |
| 30 | | James Rolph (1869–1934) | January 8, 1912 | January 6, 1931 | 18 years, 363 days | Republican | 1923 |
| 30 | | James Rolph (1869–1934) | January 8, 1912 | January 6, 1931 | 18 years, 363 days | Republican | 1927 |
| 31 | | Angelo Joseph Rossi (1878–1948) | January 7, 1931 (Note: Rossi was appointed mayor by the San Francisco Board of Supervisors after Rolph's resignation.) | January 7, 1944 | 13 years, 0 days | Republican | App. |
| 31 | | Angelo Joseph Rossi (1878–1948) | January 7, 1931 | January 7, 1944 | 13 years, 0 days | Republican | 1931 |
| 31 | | Angelo Joseph Rossi (1878–1948) | January 7, 1931 | January 7, 1944 | 13 years, 0 days | Republican | 1935 |
| 31 | | Angelo Joseph Rossi (1878–1948) | January 7, 1931 | January 7, 1944 | 13 years, 0 days | Republican | 1939 |
| 32 | | Roger Lapham (1883–1966) | January 8, 1944 | January 7, 1948 | 3 years, 364 days | Republican | 1943 |
| 33 | | Elmer Robinson (1894–1982) | January 8, 1948 | January 7, 1956 | 7 years, 364 days | Republican | 1947 |
| 33 | | Elmer Robinson (1894–1982) | January 8, 1948 | January 7, 1956 | 7 years, 364 days | Republican | 1951 |
| 34 | | George Christopher (1907–2000) | January 8, 1956 | January 7, 1964 | 7 years, 364 days | Republican | 1955 |
| 34 | | George Christopher (1907–2000) | January 8, 1956 | January 7, 1964 | 7 years, 364 days | Republican | 1959 |
| 35 | | John F. Shelley (1905–1974) | January 8, 1964 | January 7, 1968 | 3 years, 364 days | Democratic | 1963 |
| 36 | | Joseph Alioto (1916–1998) | January 8, 1968 | January 7, 1976 | 7 years, 364 days | Democratic | 1967 |
| 36 | | Joseph Alioto (1916–1998) | January 8, 1968 | January 7, 1976 | 7 years, 364 days | Democratic | 1971 |
| 37 | | George Moscone (1929–1978) | January 8, 1976 | November 27, 1978 | 2 years, 323 days | Democratic | 1975 |
| – | | Dianne Feinstein (1933–2023); Acting, then elected | November 27, 1978 (Note: Feinstein, as president of the San Francisco Board of Supervisors, became acting mayor after Moscone's assassination, and was appointed mayor by the Board after a week.) | December 4, 1978 | 7 days | Democratic | – |
| 38 | | Dianne Feinstein (1933–2023); Acting, then elected | December 4, 1978 | January 7, 1988 | 9 years, 34 days | Democratic | App. |
| 38 | | Dianne Feinstein (1933–2023); Acting, then elected | December 4, 1978 | January 7, 1988 | 9 years, 34 days | Democratic | 1979 |
| 38 | | Dianne Feinstein (1933–2023); Acting, then elected | December 4, 1978 | January 7, 1988 | 9 years, 34 days | Democratic | 1983 recall (Note: Feinstein survived a recall election.) |
| 38 | | Dianne Feinstein (1933–2023); Acting, then elected | December 4, 1978 | January 7, 1988 | 9 years, 34 days | Democratic | 1983 |
| 39 | | Art Agnos (born 1938) | January 8, 1988 | January 7, 1992 | 3 years, 364 days | Democratic | 1987 |
| 40 | | Frank Jordan (born 1935) | January 8, 1992 | January 7, 1996 | 3 years, 364 days | Democratic | 1991 |
| 41 | | Willie Brown (born 1934) | January 8, 1996 | January 7, 2004 | 7 years, 364 days | Democratic | 1995 |
| 41 | | Willie Brown (born 1934) | January 8, 1996 | January 7, 2004 | 7 years, 364 days | Democratic | 1999 |
| 42 | | Gavin Newsom (born 1967) | January 8, 2004 | January 10, 2011 (Note: Newsom resigned to become Lieutenant Governor of California.) | 7 years, 2 days | Democratic | 2003 |
| 42 | | Gavin Newsom (born 1967) | January 8, 2004 | January 10, 2011 | 7 years, 2 days | Democratic | 2007 |
| – | | David Chiu (born 1970); Acting | January 10, 2011 (Note: Chiu, as president of the San Francisco Board of Supervisors, became acting mayor after Newsom's resignation.) | January 11, 2011 | 1 day | Democratic | – |
| 43 | | Ed Lee (1952–2017) | January 11, 2011 (Note: Lee was appointed mayor by the San Francisco Board of Supervisors after Newsom's resignation.) | December 12, 2017 | 6 years, 335 days | Democratic | App. |
| 43 | | Ed Lee (1952–2017) | January 11, 2011 | December 12, 2017 | 6 years, 335 days | Democratic | 2011 |
| 43 | | Ed Lee (1952–2017) | January 11, 2011 | December 12, 2017 | 6 years, 335 days | Democratic | 2015 |
| – | | London Breed (born 1974); Acting; 1st time | December 12, 2017 (Note: Breed, as president of the San Francisco Board of Supervisors, became acting mayor after Lee's death.) | January 23, 2018 | 42 days | Democratic | – |
| 44 | | Mark Farrell (born 1974) | January 23, 2018 (Note: Farrell was appointed interim mayor by the San Francisco Board of Supervisors after Lee's death.) | July 11, 2018 | 169 days | Democratic | App. |
| 45 | | London Breed (born 1974); 2nd time | July 11, 2018 | January 8, 2025 | 6 years, 181 days | Democratic | 2018 special |
| 45 | | London Breed (born 1974); 2nd time | July 11, 2018 | January 8, 2025 | 6 years, 181 days | Democratic | 2019 |
| 46 | | Daniel Lurie (born 1977) | January 8, 2025 | Incumbent | 1 year, 303 days | Democratic | 2024 |
