= Sydney Ducks =

Australian-American crime gang

The Sydney Ducks was the name given to a gang of criminal immigrants from Australia in San Francisco, during the mid-19th century. Because many of these criminals came from the well-known British penal colonies in Australia, and were known to commit arson, they were blamed for an 1849 fire that devastated the heart of San Francisco, as well as the rampant crime in the city at the time.

The Sydney Ducks were criminals who operated as a gang, in a community that also included sailors, longshoremen, teamsters, wheelwrights, shipwrights, bartenders, saloon keepers, washerwomen, domestic servants, and dressmakers. The largest proportion (44%) were born in Ireland and migrated during the Great Irish Famine, first to Australia as laborers and then to California as part of the Gold Rush.

The criminality of the Sydney Ducks was the catalyst for the formation of the first Committee of Vigilance of 1851. The vigilantes usurped political power from the corrupt or incompetent officials in the city, conducted secret trials, lynchings, and deportations, which effectively decimated the Sydney Ducks. The area where the Sydney Ducks clustered at the base of Telegraph Hill was originally known as "Sydney-Town," but by the 1860s was called exclusively by its better-known name, the Barbary Coast.

On 19 December 1854, five members of the gang were involved in the Jonathan R. Davis fight.

== See also ==
- Anti-Australian sentiment
