= Henry Perrin Coon =

10th Mayor of San Francisco from 1863 to 1867

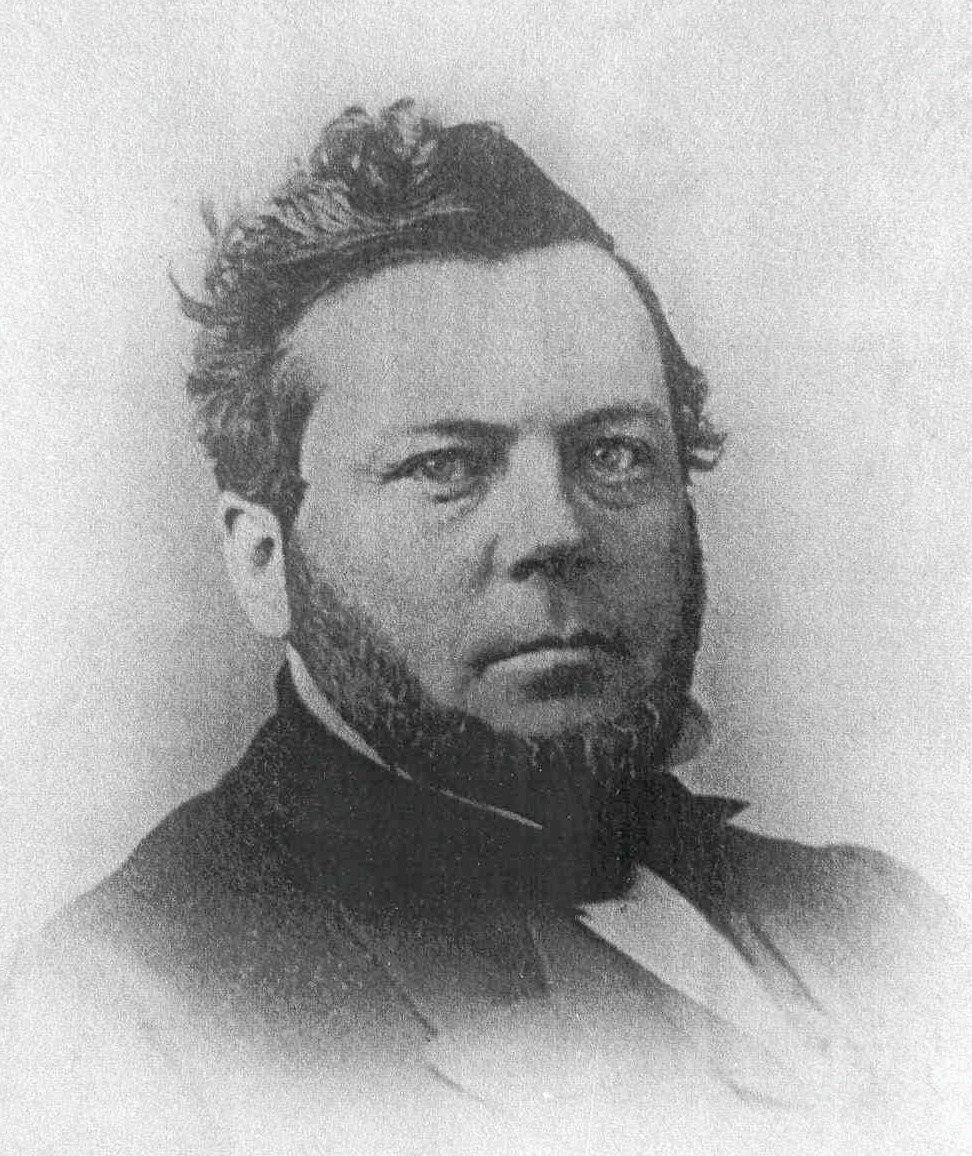

10th Mayor of San Francisco
- In office July 1, 1863 – December 1, 1867
- Preceded by: Henry F. Teschemacher
- Succeeded by: Frank McCoppin

Personal details
- Born: September 30, 1822 Columbia County, New York
- Died: December 4, 1884 (aged 62) San Francisco, California
- Party: People's Party
- Profession: teacher, doctor, lawyer, druggist, businessman

Henry Perrin Coon (September 30, 1822 – December 4, 1884) was the 10th Mayor of San Francisco who served from July 1, 1863, to December 1, 1867. He was one of the most versatile men ever to hold the office, having previously worked as a teacher, doctor, lawyer, druggist and businessman.

Coon was born on September 30, 1822, in Columbia County, New York, the youngest of 13 children, and was raised in the Presbyterian church. His parents sent him to Claverack Academy, near Hudson, New York, where he spent two or three years. He then attended Williams College where he graduated with the class of 1844. After college, he was the superintendent of Claverack Academy for a short time before beginning studies for the ministry. After about a year, his biography records that a severe cold settled into his throat that spoiled his voice for public speaking, which he ultimately regained in California's milder climate. At that point, he selected medicine as his profession. After receiving his medical degree from the Philadelphia College of Medicine in 1848, he returned to Hudson, New York where he married Ruthetta Folger on September 18, 1849. He then established a medical practice in Syracuse, New York. In 1853, he left for California, leaving his wife and infant daughter behind for the time being, although they joined him the following year. He and Ruthetta ultimately had four children: three sons and a daughter.

After arriving in San Francisco in 1853, he established a new medical practice, complete with an apothecary shop and a chemical-importing company. Coon also participated in organizing manufacturing and wholesale vinegar businesses. He was an active member of San Francisco's Vigilance Committee of 1856. When the Vigilance Committee transformed itself into a political party called the Peoples' Party later that year, he was the party's nominee for police judge. He was elected to the judgeship on November 4, 1856, receiving 8,706 votes out of 11,038 cast. Coon established a reputation for being tough on criminals (compared to the previous attitude of leniency toward them). Coon also gained notoriety for refusing to stop a duel between California Supreme Court Justice David S. Terry and U.S. Senator David C. Broderick, in which Broderick was killed. At the end of his second term in 1860, Coon stepped down from the post to return to his medical practice. In early 1861, he and his family traveled to the East Coast but returned to San Francisco late that year when he again resumed the practice of medicine.

Coon reluctantly ran for mayor in 1863 after being approached by the People's Party, winning by nearly a thousand votes in the election of May 16, 1863. While he spent his first two years in office with ceremonial duties, including participating in the opening of the Bank of California, and leading a procession through the streets after President Abraham Lincoln was assassinated, his second two-year term would be quite traumatic.

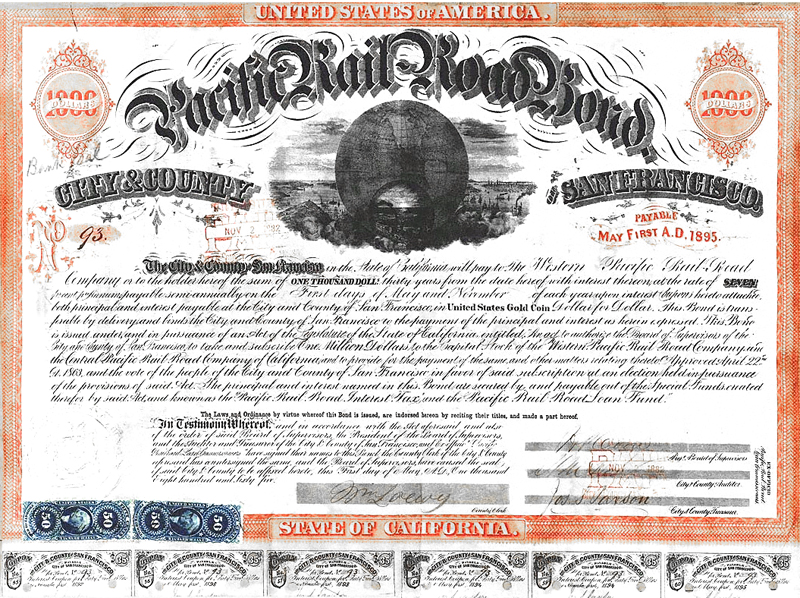
Pacific Railroad Bond, City and County of San Francisco, signed by Mayor Henry P. Coon 1865

In the same election in which Coon was first elected, there had been a bond measure known as the Railroad Subscription Act. The measure—which easily passed—called for the city government to issue $650,000 in bonds for an equal amount of stock in the Central Pacific Railroad Company. Coon, at first, refused to issue the bonds. After the railroad company obtained an injunction ordering him to do so, he acquiesced.

He also opposed William Ralston's plan to extend Montgomery Street past Howard Street in the South of Market area, even though he helped Ralston open the Bank of California. Ralston had bought land south of the intersection and had obtained approval from the Board of Supervisors. However, after Coon's veto, Ralston had to content himself with building the Palace Hotel.

Coon also turned his energies to adorning the city. He hired a crew to survey a very sandy area in the western part of the city. This sandy area would be the site of Golden Gate Park.

On April 3, 1865, by order of the San Francisco Board of Supervisors, Mayor Coon became ex officio President of the city's Board of Health.

After leaving office in 1867, he did not resume the practice of medicine but engaged in the insurance business as well as dealing in real estate. He amassed enough wealth to purchase two large ranches, one of them became part of the campus of Stanford University. In 1868, he was appointed by the Governor to the office of Tide Lands Commissioner. In 1870–71, he and his family visited Great Britain and many parts of continental Europe.

His wife, Ruthetta, died in 1877 and he remarried the next year to the widow of a Navy doctor.

Coon died of heart failure on December 4, 1884, at Ralston's Palace Hotel. In reporting his death, the Daily Alta California newspaper of San Francisco noted that "throughout his career in this city he has been conspicuous as an energetic citizen in local enterprises, with strong executive ability, conservative business principles, and the firmest integrity in all his transactions. In private life he was highly esteemed as a gentleman of kind sociability and true friendship. The activity and usefulness of his life was unbroken from the days of the pioneers up to yesterday."

He is interred at the Mountain View Cemetery in Oakland, California.

== Sources ==
- Heintz, William F., San Francisco's Mayors: 1850-1880. From the Gold Rush to the Silver Bonanza. Woodside, CA: Gilbert Roberts Publications, 1975. (Library of Congress Card No. 75-17094)
- Coon, H.I., Life of Henry P. Coon, unpublished manuscript c.1885, in the California State Library, California History Room, Sacramento, California
