= Burr Mansion (San Francisco) =

Historic home in San Francisco, built in 1875

- U.S. National Register of Historic Places
- San Francisco Designated Landmark
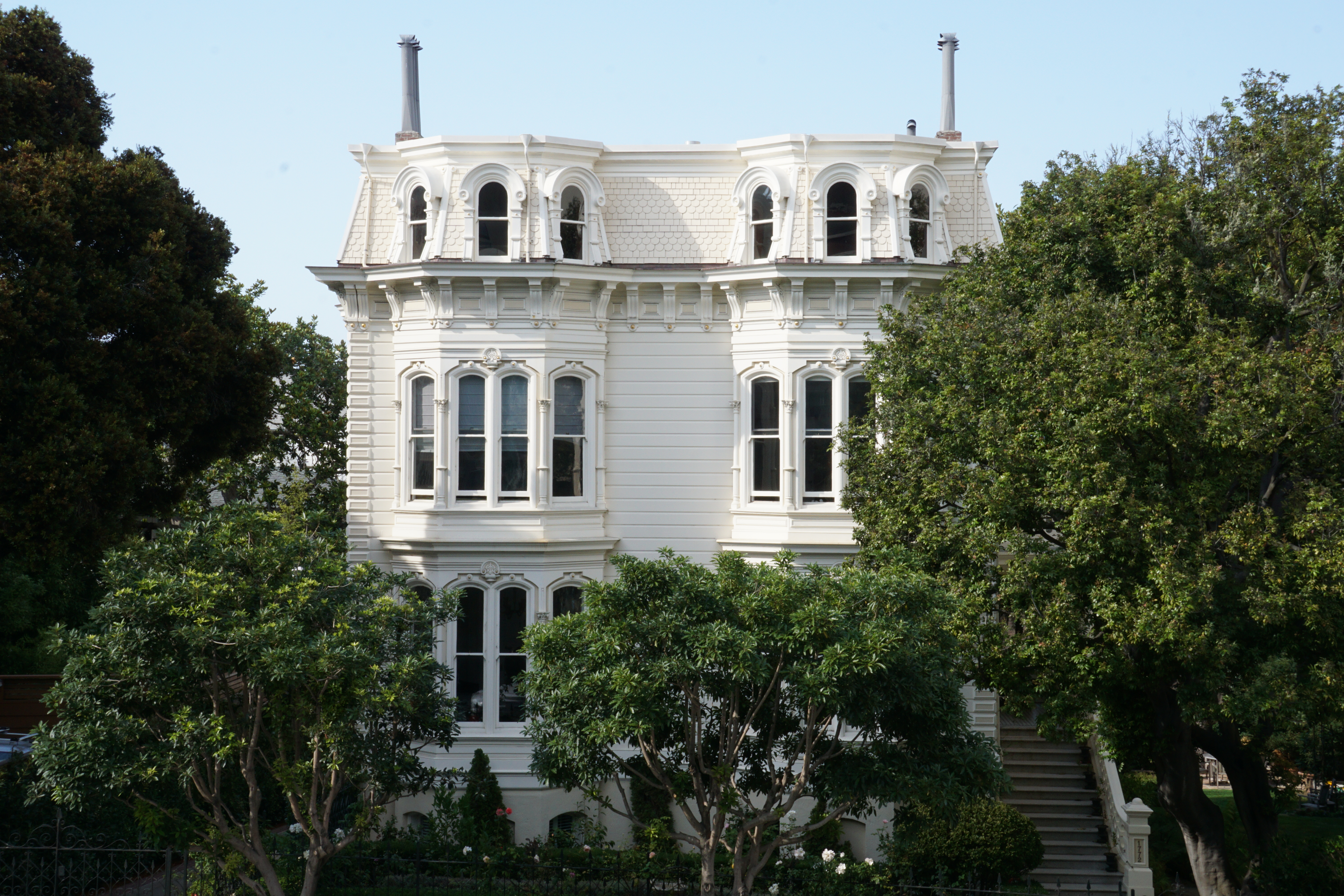

- Location within San Francisco County Location within California Location within the United States
- Location: 1772 Vallejo Street, San Francisco, California, U.S.
- Coordinates: 37.796839°N 122.426462°W
- Area: 12,535 square feet
- Built: 1875–1878
- Architect: Edmund M. Wharf
- Architectural style: Italianate architecture, Second Empire style
- NRHP reference No.: 14000967
- SFDL No.: 31

Significant dates
- Added to NRHP: June 8, 2015
- Designated SFDL: May 3, 1970

Burr Mansion, or Burr House, is a historic house built in 1875, and is located at 1772 Vallejo Street in the Cow Hollow neighborhood of San Francisco, California. It was commissioned by Ephraim Willard Burr, the 8th mayor of San Francisco and banker, for his son upon his marriage engagement.

The 19th century home is listed as a San Francisco Designated Landmark since May 3, 1970; and listed as one of the National Register of Historic Places since June 8, 2015.

== History ==
The Burr Mansion was designed by architect Edmund M. Wharf as an Italianate-style house, with a French Second Empire-style mansard roof. The house is three-story tall wood construction with a brick foundation and basement. It was commissioned for Ephraim W. Burr as a wedding gift for his son Edmond Coffin Burr (1846–1927) and his fiancé, Anna Barnard (1847–1920), and was built between 1875 and 1878 on a 12,535 square foot lot. The Burr Mansion sits on one of the largest parcels of land in the city, which has a cottage and garden. Burr's daughter Alice (1883–1968) exclusively used the garden cottage.

The mansion served as the Humanistic Psychology Institute (later known as Saybrook University) starting from 1970/1971. The house was restored and renovated from 2000 to 2003 by the English firm Smallbone. In 2009, the property featured a wine cellar, a media room, and exercise room.

In 2022, the house was placed for sale on the real estate market for US$12.9 million, with a 7,077 square foot interior with 6-bedrooms and 4.5-bathrooms. It later sold in December 2024 for $10.175 million. It was purchased by Nacho De Marco, an Argentine-American entrepreneur and CEO of BairesDev.

== See also ==
- List of San Francisco Designated Landmarks
- National Register of Historic Places listings in San Francisco
