= Henry F. Teschemacher =

9th Mayor of San Francisco from 1859 to 1863

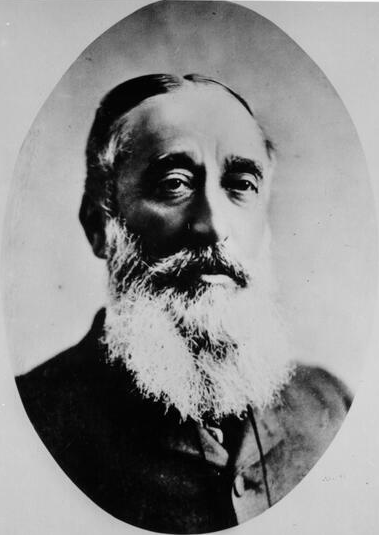

9th Mayor of San Francisco
- In office October 3, 1859 – June 30, 1863
- Preceded by: E. W. Burr
- Succeeded by: Henry Perrin Coon

Personal details
- Born: February 16, 1823 Boston, Massachusetts
- Died: November 26, 1904 (aged 81) Territet, Switzerland
- Party: People's Party
- Profession: Trader, artist, real estate agent

Henry Frederick Teschemacher (February 16, 1823 – November 26, 1904) served as the 9th mayor of San Francisco from October 3, 1859, to June 30, 1863.

He was born in Boston, Massachusetts and worked for a Boston shipping house around the 1840s. The firm sent him to San Francisco, California in 1846, where he traded goods for furs, tallow, and hides. With the start of the Gold Rush six years later, he bought a great deal of real estate in what later became San Francisco. He also sketched a drawing of the village of which he would become mayor, called View of Place of Anchorage of Yerba Buena.

Teschemacher joined the Vigilance Movement, serving in the vigilante-led trials of suspected criminals. Through his work with the vigilantes, he became known as a person who stood for law and order and was the choice of the People's Party for mayor in the 1859 election. He won due to divisions in the Democratic ranks over slavery.

His first months in office were relatively calm. He kept tabs on city spending and made few public appearances save to dedicate the city's first streetcar line. He also doubled the size of San Francisco's police force. While Teschemacher was Mayor of San Francisco, the American Civil War erupted: San Francisco coped with disrupted trade with the East by buying stock in silver mines and establishing factories that sold goods not only within the city itself but also in Asia, beginning San Francisco's path to economic self-sufficiency. 1861 also saw the completion of the New York to San Francisco telegraph line, with Teschemacher sending a congratulatory telegram to New York's mayor.

After leaving office, Teschemacher was a real estate agent until 1882. He retired to Europe, briefly appearing in San Francisco in 1892. He produced a lithograph entitled Life In California, by the Endicott Company. He died in Territet, Switzerland on November 26, 1904.

== Sources ==
- Heintz, William F., San Francisco's Mayors: 1850-1880. From the Gold Rush to the Silver Bonanza. Woodside, CA: Gilbert Roberts Publications, 1975. (Library of Congress Card No. 75-17094)
