= Frank McCoppin =

11th Mayor of San Francisco from 1867 to 1869

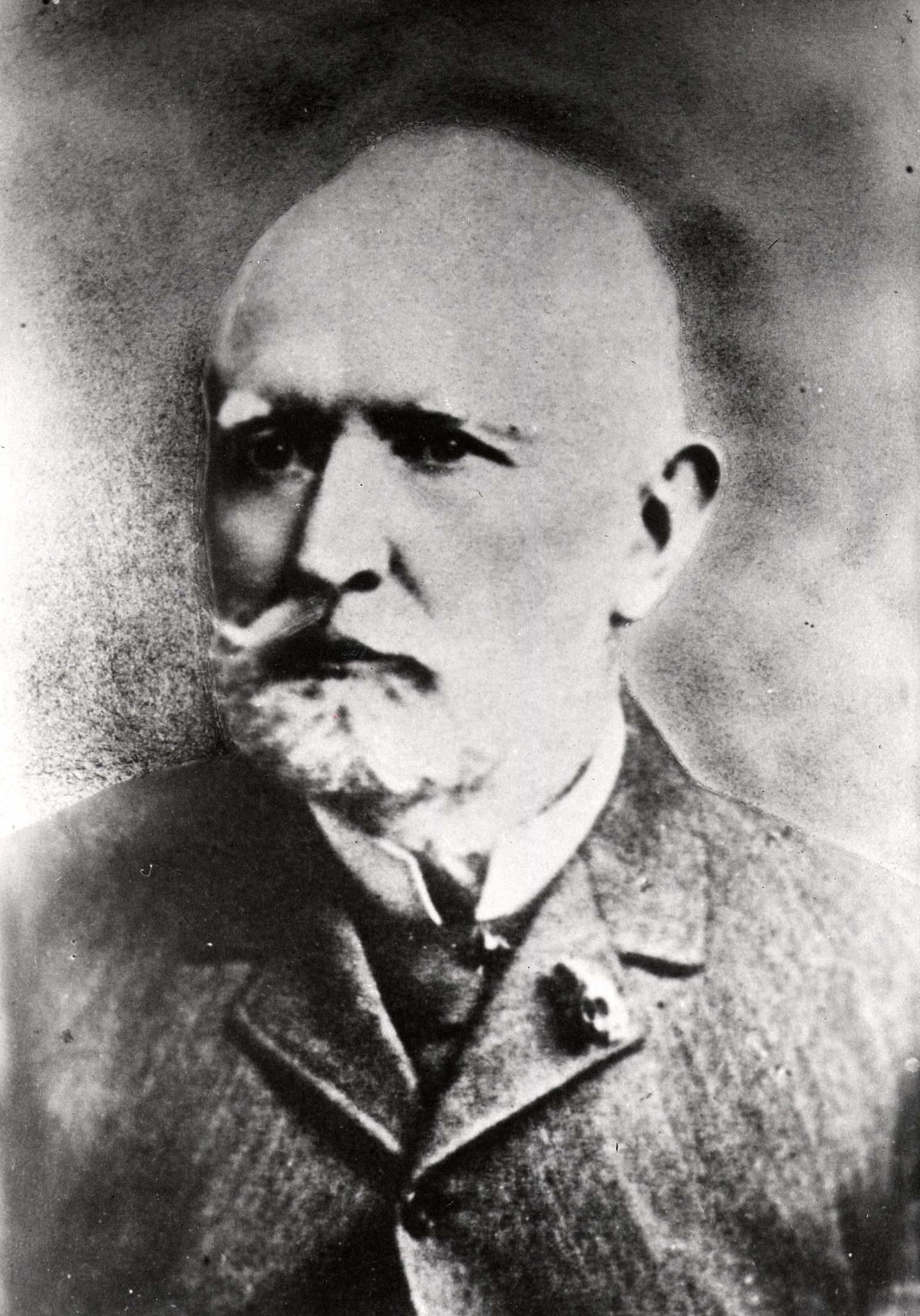

11th Mayor of San Francisco
- In office December 2, 1867 – December 4, 1869
- Preceded by: Henry Perrin Coon
- Succeeded by: Thomas Henry Selby

Member of the California Senate from the 13th district
- In office December 6, 1875 – January 5, 1880
- Preceded by: Multi-member district
- Succeeded by: Multi-member district

Personal details
- Born: July 4, 1834 County Longford, Ireland
- Died: May 26, 1897 (aged 62) San Francisco, California, U.S.
- Party: Democratic

Frank McCoppin (July 4, 1834 – May 26, 1897) was an Irish American politician who served as the mayor of San Francisco from 1867 to 1869, in addition to several other local and state offices. He was the city's first Irish-born and foreign-born mayor.

== Career ==
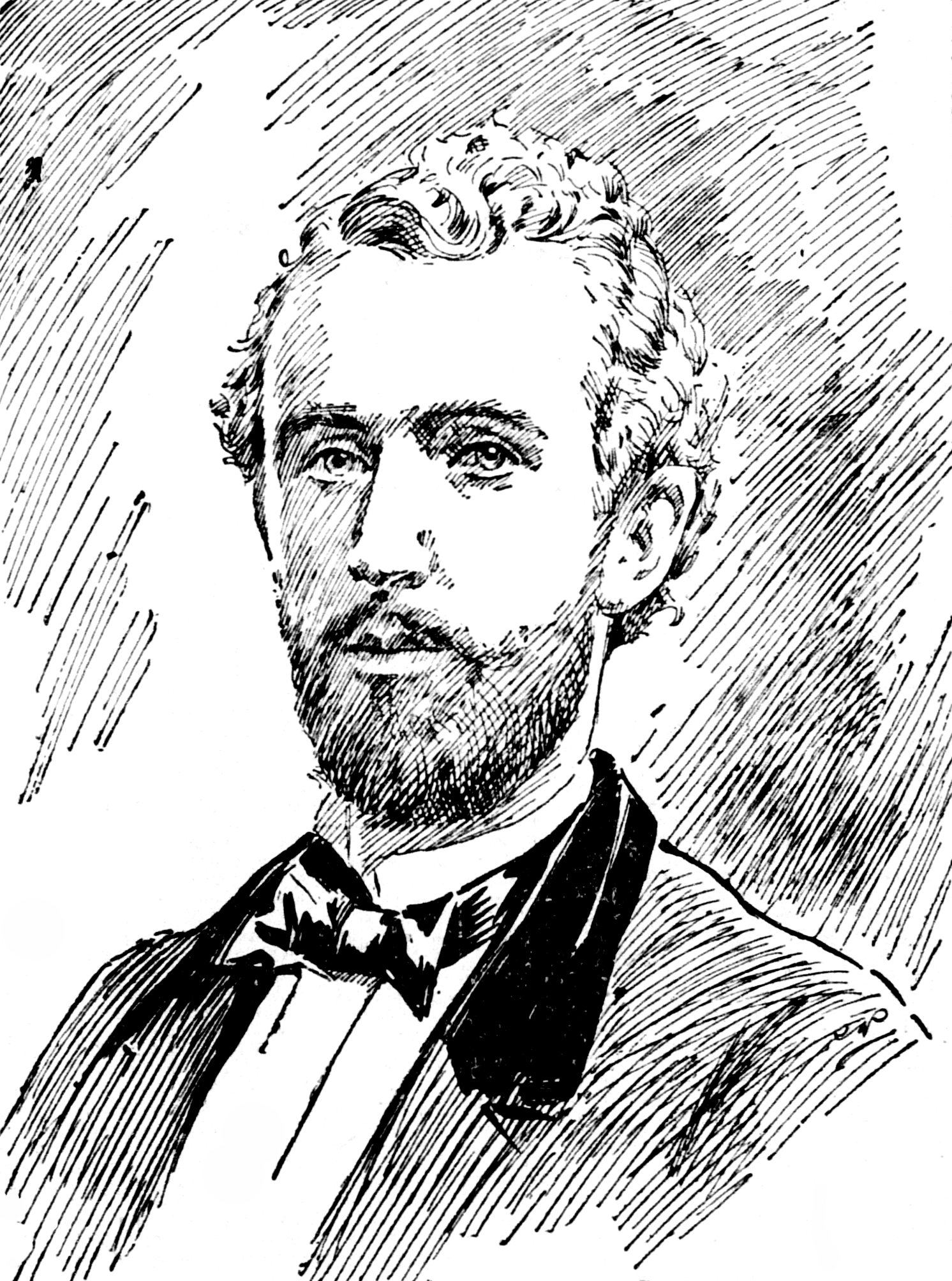
McCoppin in 1858

McCoppin was a member of the Royal Irish Constabulary from 1851 until he emigrated to the United States in 1853. In 1860, he was made supervisor of the Market Street Railway, where he encouraged planting among the railroad tracks, to lessen the problem of drifting sands. Shortly thereafter, he was elected to the San Francisco Board of Supervisors. He then was elected mayor in 1867, serving from December 2, 1867, to December 5, 1869. He and the Board of Supervisors approved the plan for Golden Gate Park January 14, 1868. However, questions regarding his citizenship (word had leaked that he was not a naturalized U.S. citizen when he was supervisor or that he applied for citizenship during his term) led to his defeat in the 1869 election.

In 1886, he ran for a seat in the United States House of Representatives but lost to William W. Morrow. He later served two terms in the California State Senate. In 1894, President Grover Cleveland appointed him Postmaster of San Francisco, a position he held until his death from stomach cancer on May 26, 1897.

He is credited with recommending the use of ladybugs to control insect pests affecting the California citrus crop.

== Personal life ==
In 1862, he was married to Elizabeth Bird Van Ness in San Francisco, thereby becoming the son-in-law of former mayor James Van Ness.

A small park, McCoppin Square, located in the Parkside District of San Francisco, is named in his honor, as are McCoppin Street in the Mission District and Frank McCoppin Elementary School, near Golden Gate Park.

== Sources ==
- Heintz, William F., San Francisco's Mayors: 1850-1880. From the Gold Rush to the Silver Bonanza. Woodside, CA: Gilbert Roberts Publications, 1975. (Library of Congress Card No. 75-17094)
- Holli, Melvin G., and Peter D'A. Jones, eds. Biographical Dictionary of American Mayors 1820-1980, (1981) pp. 232–233.
