= Belle Cora =

Madam of the Barbary Coast (1827–1862)

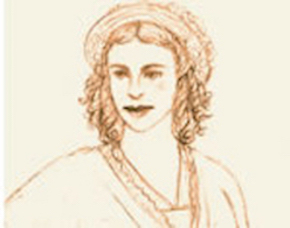
- Representation of Cora
- Born: 1827; Baltimore, Maryland, U.S.
- Died: February 18/19, 1862 (aged 34–35)
- Other name: Arabella Ryan
- Occupation: Madam

Belle Cora (1827? – February 18/19, 1862), also known as Arabella Ryan, was a madam of the Barbary Coast of San Francisco during the mid-nineteenth century. She rose to public attention in 1855 when her lover, Charles Cora, killed U.S. Marshal William H. Richardson after they had a conflict at the theater. She died in 1862.

== Early life ==
Two portrayals of Belle Cora's childhood exist. The first lists her as the daughter of a minister in Baltimore who became pregnant as a teen. Upon discovering this, Cora's father threw her out of the house, prompting Cora to move to New Orleans. There, her baby died and she met Charles Cora. The alternate version, more prominently upheld, depicts Belle to be the daughter of Irish Catholic parents in Baltimore. In this version, Cora and her sister worked at a dress shop next to a brothel. Intrigued by the house, they became involved with the sex trade. At some point, Cora ventured to Charleston, South Carolina. During her time there, she became the mistress of a man who was later killed. His death prompted Cora to move to New Orleans where in 1849 she met Charles Cora.

== Career ==
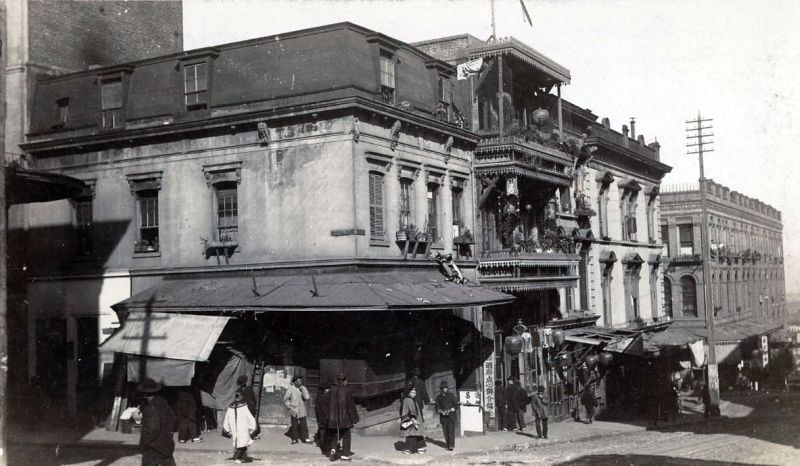
Photograph of the Cora House in 1853

In December 1849, Belle (Arabella Ryan) and Charles Cora moved to Sacramento, California and, while there, Belle helped fund Charles's high-stakes gambling. After some time, the couple moved to Marysville, California, and Belle opened her first brothel, called the New World. gambling parlor and offered games like poker, roulette, faro, and dice. At 23, they moved yet again and she opened a brothel in Sonora, California.

In 1852, Belle set up a parlor house on Washington street, in San Francisco, opposite the house of fellow madam, Ah Toy. Reverend William Taylor recounts the parlor house as being furnished with redwood, velvet, silk, demask, beautiful paintings and playing pianoforte, harp and melodeon. Belle hosted dinner parties with aldermen, judges, the mayor, and even members of the legislature. Even after an expensive legal battle and the lynching of her husband, Belle continued to run her brothel.

== Murder of Richardson and the aftermath ==
Belle Cora held a competing party (which had more guests) the same night as the wife of U.S. Marshal William H. Richardson, which is said to have begun a rivalry between the women. The feud was further provoked one evening at the American Theatre. Richardson's wife complained to the manager that the Coras were seated in the same balcony as she was, as she felt that area should be reserved for more respectable guests. However, the manager refused to remove the couple, saying that they were regular customers of the first balcony. Richardson left swearing vengeance upon Charles Cora.

On November 17, 1855, between 6 and 7 o'clock, Charles Cora shot Richardson in the chest in front of Fox and O'Connor's store on Clay Street between Leidesdorff and Montgomery streets. He died instantly from the wound. Charles Cora was arrested, handed over to the city marshal, and later placed in the county jail.

Protests and lynch mobs erupted after the murder, so Mayor James Van Ness placed Charles under a higher security accommodation for his own safety. Local citizens raised fund for a monument for Richardson in the Lone Mountain Cemetery and $15,000 for his children.

Belle funded several attorneys to represent Charles Cora including Edward Dickinson Baker and James A. McDougall. Belle paid Edward Dickinson Baker $15,000 of his $30,000 retainer in gold and sent meals to Charles Cora while he was in jail. In addition, she even went so far as trying to bribe the star witness Maria Knight to change her testimony. Alleging that Richardson had threatened Charles with a knife, the lawyers framed the case as one of self-defense. On 1856 January 17, Charles's trial ended with hung jury.

On May 15, 1856, the 2nd Committee of Vigilance was formed, and by May 17, the committee had gained 2500 members. The collected guns and began to conduct "army" drills. The following day, 3,000 armed members of the committee took Charles Cora and James P. Casey (who had shot newspaper editor James King of William in an assassination attempt). On May 18, in Sacramento, Governor Johnson responded by appointing William Tecumseh Sherman as the Major-General commanding the San Francisco division of the California State Militia. Casey's case prompted the committee to aim a cannon at the jail and demand the release of Casey and Charles Cora to the vigilantes.

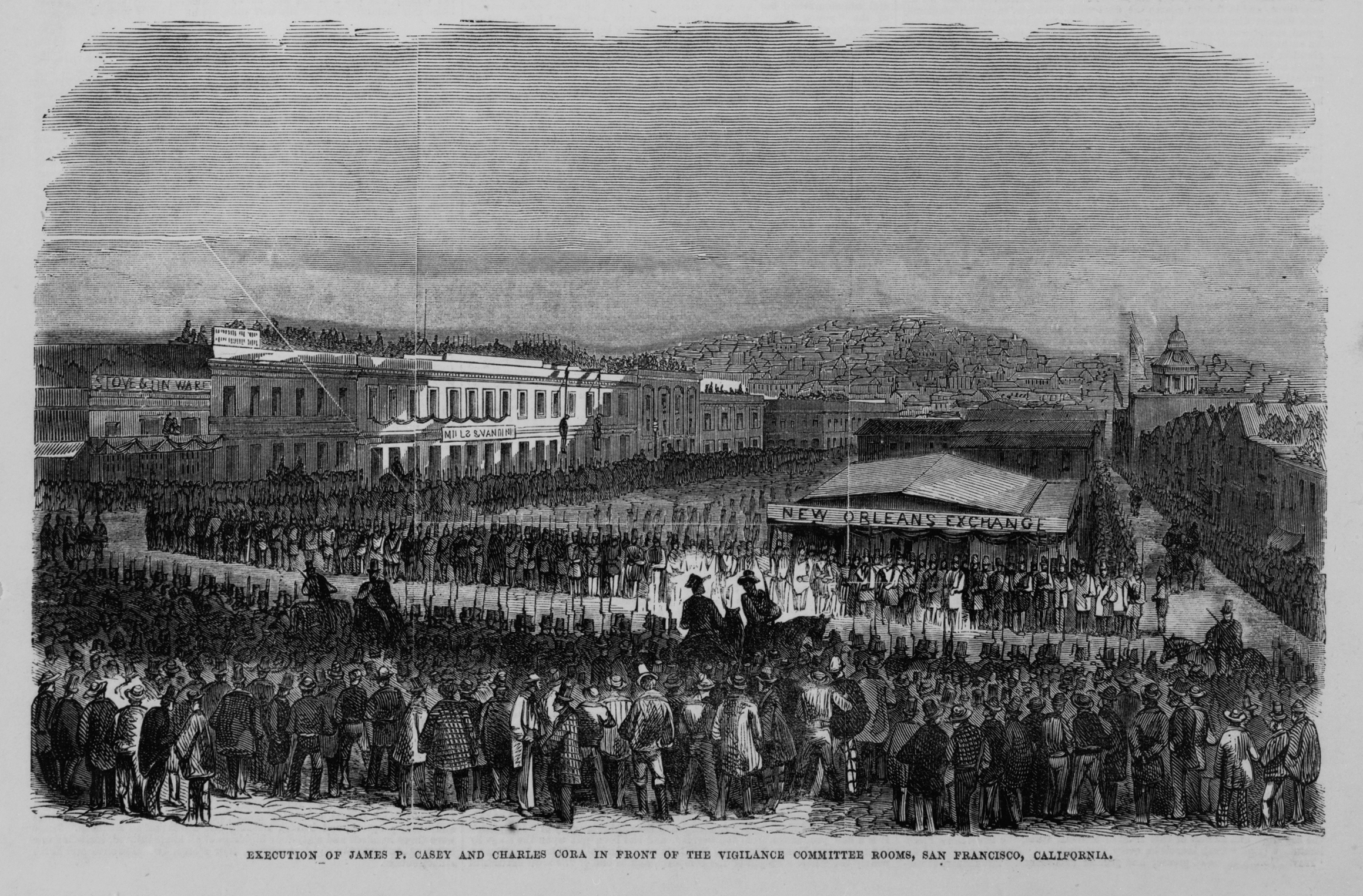
The Hanging of Charles Cora

The 2nd Committee of Vigilance scheduled a new trial for May 20; James King of William died the same day. Samuel Brannan delivered a speech on justice and the enforcement of the law before the trial. Both men were found guilty, and on 1856 May 22, the committee sentenced both to hang the following day at noon. Before the execution, Belle and Charles got married by Father Michael Acoltti.

For fear of escape, 3,000 men and two field pieces led Charles to his execution, at the committee's headquarters at 41 Sacramento Street in front of a crowd of 20,000. Charles said nothing as the noose was placed around his head. The cord was cut at twenty minutes past one o'clock, leaving Charles to drop six feet and hang for fifty five minutes before being turned over to the coroner.

== Death and legacy ==
Belle Cora died at 35, in 1862, of pneumonia. She was buried in the Calvary Cemetery next to her husband. In 1916, the San Francisco Bulletin published a serial on Cora by Pauline Jacobson and, as a result, Belle was disinterred and reburied with Charles beneath a common headstone at the Mission Dolores Cemetery.

Karen Joy Fowler's alludes to Cora's influence on social norms in novel Sister Noon. During a societal shift toward "civilizing" society, Belle had maintained her business, which had been seen as immoral. In the book Arresting Dress, the author Clare Sears opines that Cora inspires female financial agency and the use of sex for empowerment. In addition, Cora advocated against gender stereotypes, as demonstrated by her legal battle with the Vigilance Committee; ultimately she set the precedent to resist further legislation like that of sodomy laws in the 20th century.

== See also ==
- List of people from San Francisco

== Footnotes ==
=== Works cited ===
- Adams, Charles F. (2018). Murder by the Bay: Historic Homicide in and about the City of San Francisco. Quill Driver Books. ISBN 978-1884995460 – via Google Books.
- Duke, Thomas Samuel (1910). "Famous Vigilance Committee and Battles With Squatters". Celebrated Criminal Cases of America. San Francisco: James H. Barry Company. pp. 20–22. OCLC 3811019. "By Thomas Samuel Duke, Captain of Police, San Francisco; Published with Approval of the Honorable Board of Police Commissioners of San Francisco, 1910. (Public Domain Free Download)"
- Fowler, Karen Joy (2002). Sister Noon. Penguin. ISBN 978-1-101-65984-7.
- Hurtado, Albert L. (1999). Intimate Frontiers: Sex, Gender, and Culture in Old California. UNM Press. ISBN 978-0826319548 – via Google Books.
- Jensen, Vickie (2012). Women Criminals: An Encyclopedia of People and Issues. ABC-CLIO. ISBN 978-0-313-33713-0.
- Levy, JoAnn (2013). They Saw the Elephant: Women in the California Gold Rush. University of Oklahoma Press. ISBN 978-0806189932 – via Google Books.
- Sears, Clare (2015). Arresting Dress: Cross-Dressing, Law, and Fascination in Nineteenth-Century San Francisco. Duke University Press. ISBN 978-0-8223-7619-4.
- Williamson, G. R. (2012). Frontier Gambling. G.R. Williamson. ISBN 978-0985278014 – via Google Books.
- Woolley, Lell Hawley (1913). California, 1849–1913; or, The rambling sketches and experiences of sixty-four years' residence in that state. Oakland, CA: De Witt & Snelling.

=== General references ===
- Weirde (1994). Dr. Weirde's Weirde Tours: A Guide to Mysterious San Francisco. San Francisco: Barrett-James Books. ISBN 978-0-9643559-0-3.
