= John Long Wilson =

American physician

John Long Wilson (1914–2001) was a medical professor and administrator at American University of Beirut, Lebanon, and at Stanford University. He was the author of a manuscript on the history of the Stanford medical school.

== Personal ==
Wilson was born in Sturgis, Kentucky, in 1914 and earned a bachelor's degree at Vanderbilt University in 1935. He earned his medical degree in 1939 from Harvard Medical School and completed his residency at Massachusetts General Hospital in 1949.

In a memorial, four of his colleagues wrote that Wilson:

was a tall, slim grey-haired eminence, always properly clad in his long, white coat while at work. His favored mode of transportation . . . was his old black bicycle, which he rode daily, in fair weather and foul, bundled up in cold weather with scarf, gloves, warm coat and ear muffs.

Wilson died at age 87 on April 5, 2001, survived by his wife, Janice Lee Wilson, and five children, Burgess, Damaris, John, Rosser and Wyndham.

== Professional ==
Wilson joined the Navy the day after the Japanese attack on Pearl Harbor and became a flight surgeon, with the rank of lieutenant commander.

After the war, Wilson was planning to join the faculty of Cheloo Medical School in China, but instead took a position as a clinical instructor at the Stanford University School of Medicine campus in San Francisco when he learned that the Communist regime in China had closed Cheloo to foreigners.

In 1953 he became a professor at the American University in Beirut, Lebanon, later being appointed dean of the Faculty of Medical Sciences there.

He returned to the Stanford Medical School in 1968, this time at the Palo Alto, California, campus and became the first coordinator of the California Regional Medical Programs, which specialized in education about and treatment of heart disease, cancer and stroke.

In 1970, Wilson became acting vice president and dean of the medical school. Of that year, his colleagues wrote:

This was a time of campus unrest nationwide. . . . Activities of the protestors affected the very fabric of the University, including attempts to shut down the hospital. Only one person remained calm throughout[,] and that was John L. Wilson. . . . He refused to be intimidated or pressured at the negotiating table, even when the leader of the protest placed a loaded Colt 45 on the table.

From 1971 to 1985, Wilson was associate dean for faculty affairs, retiring from active university life in the latter year, but returning for a one-year stint in 1987 as acting chief of staff at Stanford University Hospital. In that year he received the Alwin C. Rambar Award for "excellence and compassion in patient care and in dealing with all members of the Hospital community."

Wilson's last endeavor was in writing a 1,500-page manuscript on Stanford University School of Medicine and the Predecessor Schools: A Historical Perspective, which was published online.
