= James H. Roxburgh =

American trade unionist (1858–1934)

Roxburgh, c. 1905

James Henry Roxburgh (January 17, 1858 – February 21, 1934) was an American pressman, trade unionist, and local historian who served as secretary of the San Francisco Pressmens' Union from 1890 to 1907. A longtime resident of the city's South of Market neighborhood, he wrote dozens of articles on the history of the area for the South of Market Journal.

== Early life and career ==
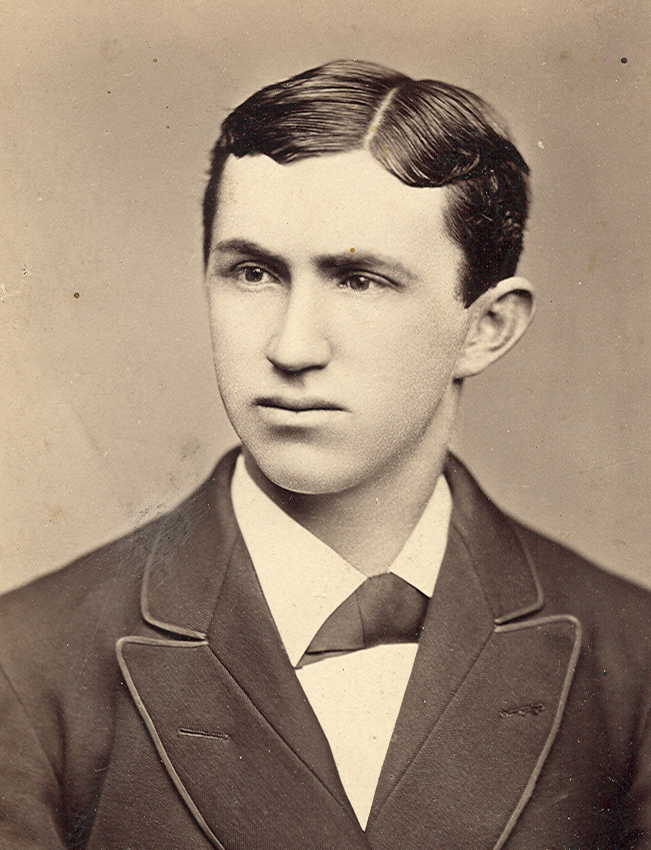
Roxburgh, c. 1870s–1880s

Roxburgh was born on January 17, 1858, in San Francisco, and came to Santa Cruz with his family at the age of six weeks. He returned to San Francisco in 1871, living on Clementina Street in the South of Market neighborhood and attending the Eighth Street Grammar School nearby. In his youth he worked at a bark mill and by 1875 he was employed as a pressman by Benjamin F. Sterett. He later worked at the Women's Co-operative Printing Union, the California Cigar Box Company, and the Santa Cruz Sentinel. He also played for the San Francisco "Alerts" baseball club and served as a delegate to the founding convention of the Amateur Baseball League of California in 1879.

== Union career ==
By Labor Day 1890, Roxburgh was serving as recording secretary of the Pressmens' Union No. 24 and on the executive committee of the Federated Trades Council. In 1891 he was elected recording secretary of the Federated Trades, serving in that position for one year. He remained secretary of the Pressmen until 1907, serving his last year under George L. Berry as president.

== Political career ==
Mayor Eugene Schmitz addresses an open-air meeting hosted by the Allied Printing Trades Schmitz Club, of which Roxburgh was president, October 29, 1905

Roxburgh was an active member of the Workingmen's Party of California, serving as a delegate to its 1880 city convention. For the next 20 years he was a member of the Democratic Party, campaigning for the likes of James G. Maguire and Grover Cleveland. Though he broke from the party in 1894 to seek the Populist Party nomination for recorder of San Francisco, he returned to the fold soon after and in 1901 was elected president of the Thirty-sixth Assembly District Democratic Club. In 1899, he was identified with a faction pledged to boss Christopher Augustine Buckley.

In 1901, Roxburgh again broke from the Democratic Party to become a founding member of the Union Labor Party. He was elected to its county committee soon after and was identified with a faction associated with boss Abe Ruef. After Eugene Schmitz was elected mayor of San Francisco that November, Roxburgh was appointed deputy clerk of the Justices' Court the following January, but was suddenly dismissed just two months later. Although the chief clerk stated this was because he did not have enough work for him, The San Francisco Call and San Francisco Chronicle claimed the actual reason was that Roxburgh had made statements against Schmitz because he was jealous he did not receive a better position. In August Roxburgh claimed the pro-Ruef faction was circumventing party democracy to bring the organization under Ruef's control.

Roxburgh broke from Schmitz and the Union Labor Party in 1903, supporting Democrat Franklin Knight Lane for mayor. At a campaign rally held at Divisadero Hall, Roxburgh charged that Ruef had taken over the party and that it was no longer representative of organized labor. Two years later, Roxburgh reversed his position and endorsed Schmitz for reelection, insisting that labor had to unite against the Citizens' Alliance. During the campaign he served as president of the Allied Printing Trades Schmitz Club, and the following January he was appointed a copyist by Union Labor recorder John H. Nelson. By 1911, he had once more left the party and supported Republican James Rolph for mayor.

== Later life and death ==
Roxburgh worked as a janitor and shop mechanic for the San Francisco Department of Education for fifteen years, retiring on February 1, 1929. He died at the San Francisco Hospital on February 21, 1934, having suffered from internal injuries and pneumonia sustained after he was struck by a car the previous month. Newspaper obituaries later claimed he died at his home of a "brief illness."

== Family ==
Roxburgh married his wife Lillian on June 11, 1883, with whom he had three children. Some sources have confused Roxburgh for his brother Joseph A. Roxburgh, a professional baseball player who played catcher in the Major Leagues from 1884 to 1887.

== Works ==
- "Japanese Printing". The British Lithographer. III (16). London: Raithby, Lawrence & Co.: 128 April–May 1894.
- "Woodward's Gardens". South of Market Journal. 1 (10). San Francisco: South of Market Boys: 16, 34. May 1926.
- "Memories of Days of '50". South of Market Journal. 2 (6). San Francisco: South of Market Boys: 8. January 1927.
- "The Police Dept. of San Francisco in 1875". South of Market Journal. 2 (12). San Francisco: South of Market Boys: 8. August 1927.
- "The Fire Department of 1875". South of Market Journal. 3 (1). San Francisco: South of Market Boys: 11, 17. September 1927.
- "Hotels and Boarding Houses of Other Days". South of Market Journal. 3 (3). San Francisco: South of Market Boys: 12. December 1927.
- "Hayes Park". South of Market Journal. 3 (5). San Francisco: South of Market Boys: 14, 18. February 1928.
- "Shell Mound Park–An Old-Time S. O. M. Picnic Park". South of Market Journal. 3 (6). San Francisco: South of Market Boys: 15–17. March 1928.
- "Just a Few Words About That Corned Beef and Cabbage Dinner". South of Market Journal. 3 (7). San Francisco: South of Market Boys: 14, 17. April 1928.
- "The Hackmen of Long Ago". South of Market Journal. 3 (8). San Francisco: South of Market Boys: 21–22. May 1928.
- "The Boys of the Days of Old". South of Market Journal. 3 (10). San Francisco: South of Market Boys: 11–12. September 1928.
- "The Hackmen of Long Ago II". South of Market Journal. 3 (11). San Francisco: South of Market Boys: 8–9. October 1928.
- "The Hackmen of Long Ago III". South of Market Journal. 3 (12). San Francisco: South of Market Boys: 9–10. November 1928.
- "St. Joseph's Boys". South of Market Journal. 3 (12). San Francisco: South of Market Boys: 10. November 1928.
- "An Incident in Our Initiation". South of Market Journal. 4 (3). San Francisco: South of Market Boys: 18. February 1929.
- "St. Patrick's Day Luncheon". South of Market Journal. 4 (4). San Francisco: South of Market Boys: 9. March 1929.
- "The Reno Baseball Club". South of Market Journal. 4 (5). San Francisco: South of Market Boys: 12–15. April 1929.
- "Corned Beef and Cabbage". South of Market Journal. 4 (5). San Francisco: South of Market Boys: 19–21. April 1929.
- "Mother: A Tribute To One We Love". South of Market Journal. 4 (6). San Francisco: South of Market Boys: 9. May 1929.
- "Third Street". South of Market Journal. 4 (8). San Francisco: South of Market Boys: 10–12. July 1929.
- "A Political Incident of Long Ago". South of Market Journal. 4 (8). San Francisco: South of Market Boys: 14. July 1929.
- "The Picnic". South of Market Journal. 4 (10). San Francisco: South of Market Boys: 6–7. September 1929.
- "A Few Memories of Long Ago". South of Market Journal. 4 (10). San Francisco: South of Market Boys: 13. September 1929.
- "The Apprentice System". South of Market Journal. 4 (11). San Francisco: South of Market Boys: 14–15. October 1929.
- "A Puzzle". South of Market Journal. 5 (1). San Francisco: South of Market Boys: 8. December 1929.
- "A Political Incident". South of Market Journal. 5 (2). San Francisco: South of Market Boys: 4. January 1930.
- "An Irish Feud". South of Market Journal. 5 (3). San Francisco: South of Market Boys: 6. February 1930.
- "An Open Apology". South of Market Journal. 5 (4). San Francisco: South of Market Boys: 4. March 1930.
- "What Dan Told Me". South of Market Journal. 5 (4). San Francisco: South of Market Boys: 5–6. March 1930.
- "The Luncheon". South of Market Journal. 5 (4). San Francisco: South of Market Boys: 14–15. March 1930.
- "Steuart Street in Those Other Days". South of Market Journal. 5 (5). San Francisco: South of Market Boys: 4–9. April 1930.
- "Believe It or Not (With Apologies to Ripley): The Boy Who Rang the Third Alarm". South of Market Journal. 5 (7). San Francisco: South of Market Boys: 10–11. June 1930.
- "The Picnic". South of Market Journal. 5 (9). San Francisco: South of Market Boys: 7–8. September 1930.
- ""Believe It or Not" With Apologies to Ripley". South of Market Journal. 5 (9). San Francisco: South of Market Boys: 11. September 1930.
- "Judge Isadore Harris and His Boat". South of Market Journal. 5 (10). San Francisco: South of Market Boys: 8. October 1930.
- "Just a Few for the Boys and Girls". South of Market Journal. 8 (1). San Francisco: South of Market Boys: 15. January 1933.
- "Ye Old "Sports" Page". South of Market Journal. 8 (1). San Francisco: South of Market Boys: 16. January 1933.
- "Jokes for the Ladies". South of Market Journal. 8 (2). San Francisco: South of Market Boys: 6. February 1933.
- "Ye Olde Sports Page". South of Market Journal. 8 (2). San Francisco: South of Market Boys: 10. February 1933.
- "Folsom Street Between First and Second". South of Market Journal. 8 (2). San Francisco: South of Market Boys: 12–13. February 1933.
- "In the Days of Old". South of Market Journal. 8 (2). San Francisco: South of Market Boys: 16. February 1933.
- "The Waterfront: From Market to Fourth and Channel Streets". South of Market Journal. 8 (3). San Francisco: South of Market Boys: 14–15. March 1933.
- "The Waterfront: From Market to Fourth and Channel Streets II". South of Market Journal. 8 (4). San Francisco: South of Market Boys: 17–18. April 1933.
- "The Waterfront: From Market to Fourth and Channel Streets III". South of Market Journal. 8 (5). San Francisco: South of Market Boys: 16–18. May 1933.
- "Along the Waterfront: From Market to Fourth and Channel Streets IV". South of Market Journal. 8 (6). San Francisco: South of Market Boys: 17. June 1933.
- "Along the Waterfront: From Market to Fourth and Channel Streets V". South of Market Journal. 8 (7). San Francisco: South of Market Boys: 9. July 1933.
- "Talent From South of Market". South of Market Journal. 8 (8). San Francisco: South of Market Boys: 17. August 1933.

=== Memories of the Past ===
- "A Few Memories of the Past". South of Market Journal. 1 (5). San Francisco: South of Market Boys: 8. December 1925.
- "Memories of the Past". South of Market Journal. 1 (6). San Francisco: South of Market Boys: 20, 32. January 1926.
- "Memories of the Past". South of Market Journal. 1 (7). San Francisco: South of Market Boys: 12, 16–17. February 1926.
- "Memories of the Past". South of Market Journal. 1 (8). San Francisco: South of Market Boys: 12, 16–17. March 1926.
- "Memories of the Past". South of Market Journal. 1 (9). San Francisco: South of Market Boys: 12, 17–18. April 1926.
- "Memories of the Past". South of Market Journal. 1 (10). San Francisco: South of Market Boys: 11. May 1926.
- "Memories of the Past". South of Market Journal. 1 (11). San Francisco: South of Market Boys: 11. June 1926.
- "Memories of the Past". South of Market Journal. 1 (12). San Francisco: South of Market Boys: 4, 11. July 1926.
- "Memories of the Past". South of Market Journal. 2 (1). San Francisco: South of Market Boys: 21, 27. August 1926.
- "Memories of the Past". South of Market Journal. 2 (2). San Francisco: South of Market Boys: 11. September 1926.
- "Memories of the Past". South of Market Journal. 2 (3). San Francisco: South of Market Boys: 11. October 1926.
- "Memories of the Past". South of Market Journal. 2 (4). San Francisco: South of Market Boys: 11, 15. November 1926.
- "Memories of the Past". South of Market Journal. 2 (5). San Francisco: South of Market Boys: 19, 31–32. December 1926.
- "Memories of the Past". South of Market Journal. 2 (6). San Francisco: South of Market Boys: 11. January 1927.
- "Memories of the Past". South of Market Journal. 2 (7). San Francisco: South of Market Boys: 11, 13, 17. February 1927.
- "Memories of the Past". South of Market Journal. 2 (8). San Francisco: South of Market Boys: 11, 13. March 1927.
- "Memories of the Past". South of Market Journal. 2 (9). San Francisco: South of Market Boys: 19, 31, 33. April 1927.
- "Memories of the Past". South of Market Journal. 2 (10). San Francisco: South of Market Boys: 11, 13, 17–18. May 1927.
- "Memories of the Past". South of Market Journal. 2 (11). San Francisco: South of Market Boys: 11, 15, 18. June 1927.
- "Memories of the Past". South of Market Journal. 2 (12). San Francisco: South of Market Boys: 17, 22–23. August 1927.
- "Memories of the Past". South of Market Journal. 3 (1). San Francisco: South of Market Boys: 13, 17. September 1927.
- "Memories of the Past". South of Market Journal. 3 (2). San Francisco: South of Market Boys: 11, 16–17. October 1927.
- "Memories of the Past". South of Market Journal. 3 (3). San Francisco: South of Market Boys: 15, 21. December 1927.
- "Memories of the Past". South of Market Journal. 3 (4). San Francisco: South of Market Boys: 11, 13. January 1928.
- "Memories of the Past". South of Market Journal. 4 (3). San Francisco: South of Market Boys: 6–7. February 1929.
- "Memories of the Past". South of Market Journal. 4 (6). San Francisco: South of Market Boys: 15–16. May 1929.
- "Songs of the Past". South of Market Journal. 4 (7). San Francisco: South of Market Boys: 9–10. June 1929.
- "Memories of the Past". South of Market Journal. 4 (8). San Francisco: South of Market Boys: 6–7. July 1929.
- "Memories of the Past". South of Market Journal. 4 (9). San Francisco: South of Market Boys: 7–8. August 1929.
- "Memories of the Past". South of Market Journal. 4 (11). San Francisco: South of Market Boys: 12–14. October 1929.
- "Memories of the Past". South of Market Journal. 4 (12). San Francisco: South of Market Boys: 13–15. November 1929.
- "Memories of the Past". South of Market Journal. 5 (1). San Francisco: South of Market Boys: 6–7. December 1929.
- "Memories of the Past". South of Market Journal. 5 (3). San Francisco: South of Market Boys: 8. February 1930.
- "Memories of the Past". South of Market Journal. 5 (7). San Francisco: South of Market Boys: 13. June 1930.
- "Memories of the Past". South of Market Journal. 5 (8). San Francisco: South of Market Boys: 4–7. August 1930.
