= Isadore Less =

German-American labor leader

- Less c. 1901
- Born: 1869; Alsace, France
- Died: January 26, 1935 (aged 65–66); San Francisco, California, U.S.
- Occupation: Labor leader
- Known for: Foundation of the Union Labor Party
- Political party: Union Labor
- Spouse(s): Annie (m. 1891; div. 1911) Florence
- Children: 4

Isadore Less (1869 – January 26, 1935) was a German American labor leader who was the original driving force behind the formation of the San Francisco Union Labor Party in 1901. At the time he was the Secretary of the local Journeymen Barber's Union, and was selected as the ULP's candidate for Auditor in the elections held that year. During the campaign, he misappropriated union funds, leading to his flight from the country and eventual arrest.
