= Joseph A. Roxburgh =

American baseball player (1860s–1933)

- Catcher
- Born: 1860 or 1861; Santa Cruz, California, U.S.
- Died: April 19, 1933 (aged 73); San Diego, California, U.S.
- Batted: Right Threw: Right

MLB debut
- May 30, 1884, for the Baltimore Orioles

Last MLB appearance
- June 9, 1887, for the Philadelphia Athletics

MLB statistics
- Batting average: .250
- On-base percentage: .357
- Slugging percentage: .250

Teams
- Baltimore Orioles (1884); Philadelphia Athletics (1887)

Joseph Alex Roxburgh (1860 or 1861 – April 19, 1933) was an American professional baseball player who played catcher in the Major Leagues from 1884 to 1887.

== Baseball career ==
Roxburgh (third column, bottom) as player-manager of the Jamestown baseball club, 1890

Roxburgh entered the Minor Leagues playing for the San Francisco Eagles and Leadville Blues before making his Major League debut with the Baltimore Orioles in 1884. The first Major League receiver from San Francisco, he played only two games before he was let go to Hamilton, later playing for the Augusta Browns and Binghamton Crickets. He returned to the Major Leagues in 1887 with the Philadelphia Athletics, but again only played two games. Returning to the minor leagues once more, he played for Bradford and the Sacramento Altas before finishing his pro career in 1890 as player-manager for the Jamestown baseball club.

== Family ==
Some sources have confused Roxburgh for his brother James H. Roxburgh, a pressman, trade unionist and local historian who served as secretary of the San Francisco Pressmens' Union from 1890 to 1907. James also played baseball; he was a member of the San Francisco "Alerts" club and served as a delegate to the founding convention of the Amateur Baseball League of California in 1879.
