= 1909 San Francisco mayoral election =

- November 2, 1909
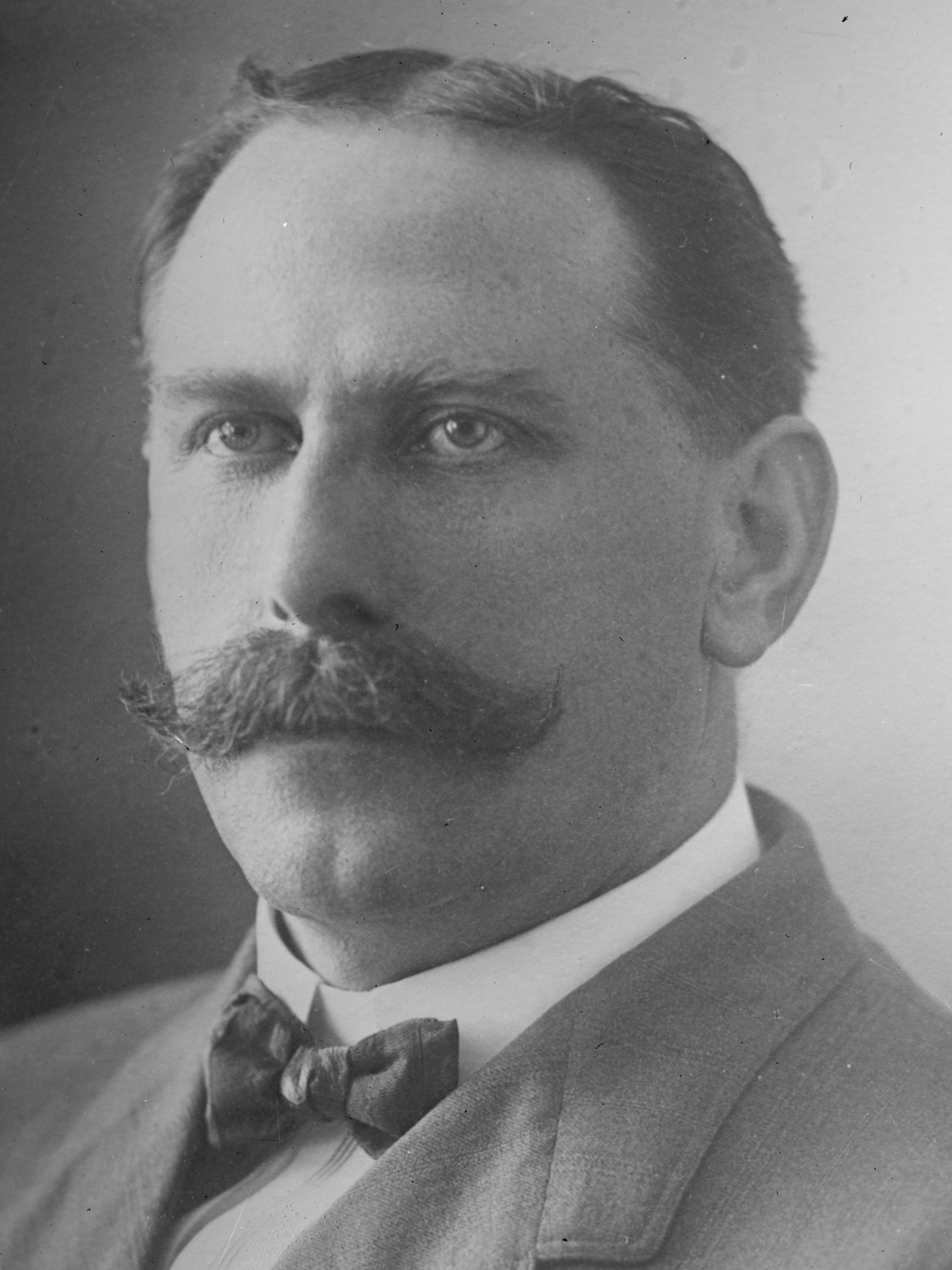

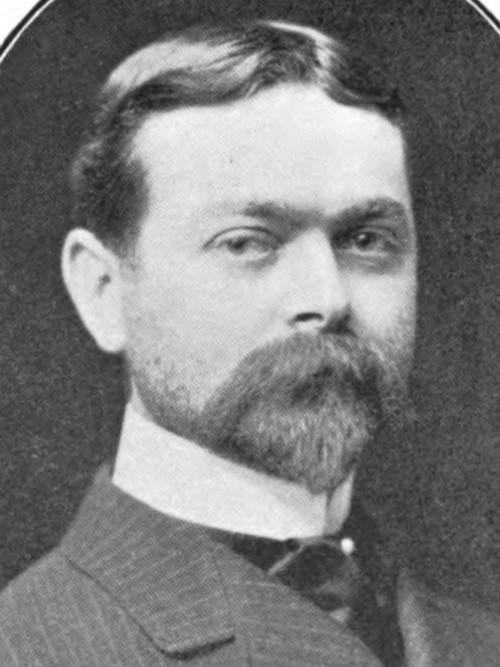

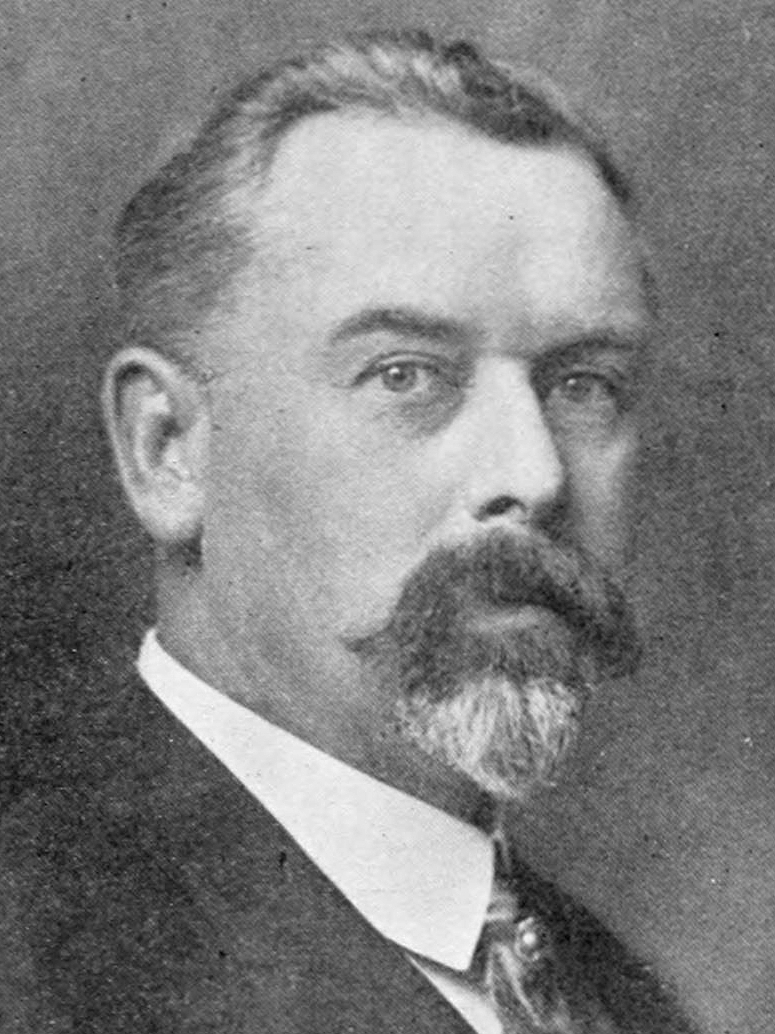
Candidate	P. H. McCarthy	Thomas B. W. Leland	William Crocker
Party	Union Labor	Democratic	Republican
Popular vote	29,437	19,602	13,717
Percentage	45.34%	30.19%	21.13%
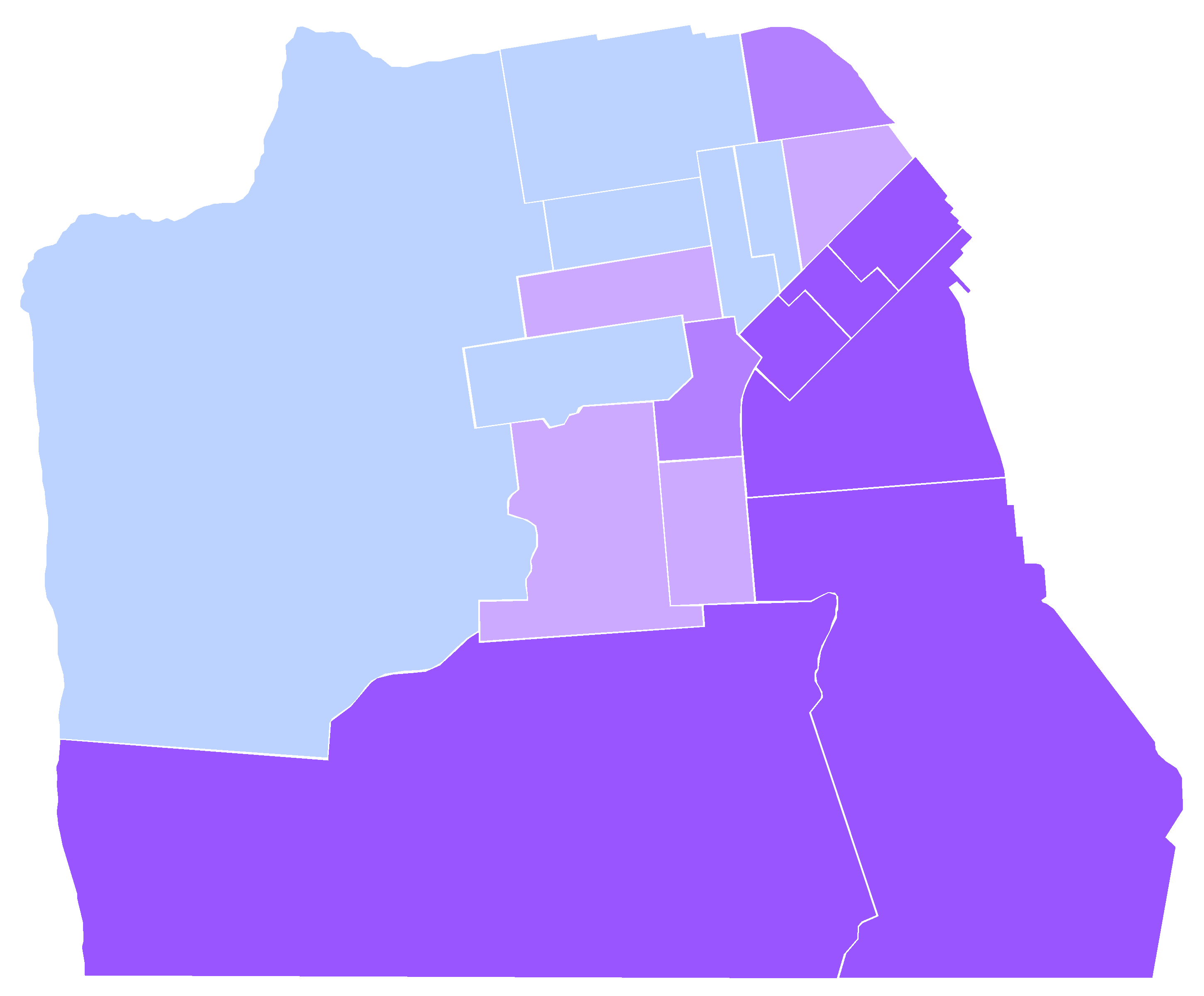
- Results by State Assembly district McCarthy: 40–50% 50–60% 60–70% Leland: 30–40%
Mayor before election
Edward Robeson Taylor
Democratic
Elected Mayor
P. H. McCarthy
Union Labor

The 1909 San Francisco mayoral election was held on November 2, 1909. P. H. McCarthy was elected with 45% of the vote.

== Results ==
1909 San Francisco mayoral election
Party	Candidate	Votes	%
Union Labor	P. H. McCarthy	29,437	45.34%
Democratic	Thomas B. W. Leland	19,602	30.19%
Republican	William Crocker	13,717	21.13%
Socialist	William McDevitt	2,175	3.35%
Total votes		64,931	100.00
Union Labor gain from Democratic			
