= Union Labor Party (California) =

- Leaders: Abe Ruef; Eugene Schmitz; Patrick H. McCarthy
- Founded: 1901
- Dissolved: 1912
- Headquarters: San Francisco
- Ideology: Nativism; Labor rights Closed shop politics

The Union Labor Party was a San Francisco, California working class political party of the first decade of the 20th century. The organization, which endorsed the doctrine of nativism, was a powerful force in city politics and the labor movement, electing its nominee as Mayor of San Francisco in 1901, 1903, 1905, and 1909.

== Organizational history ==
=== Background ===
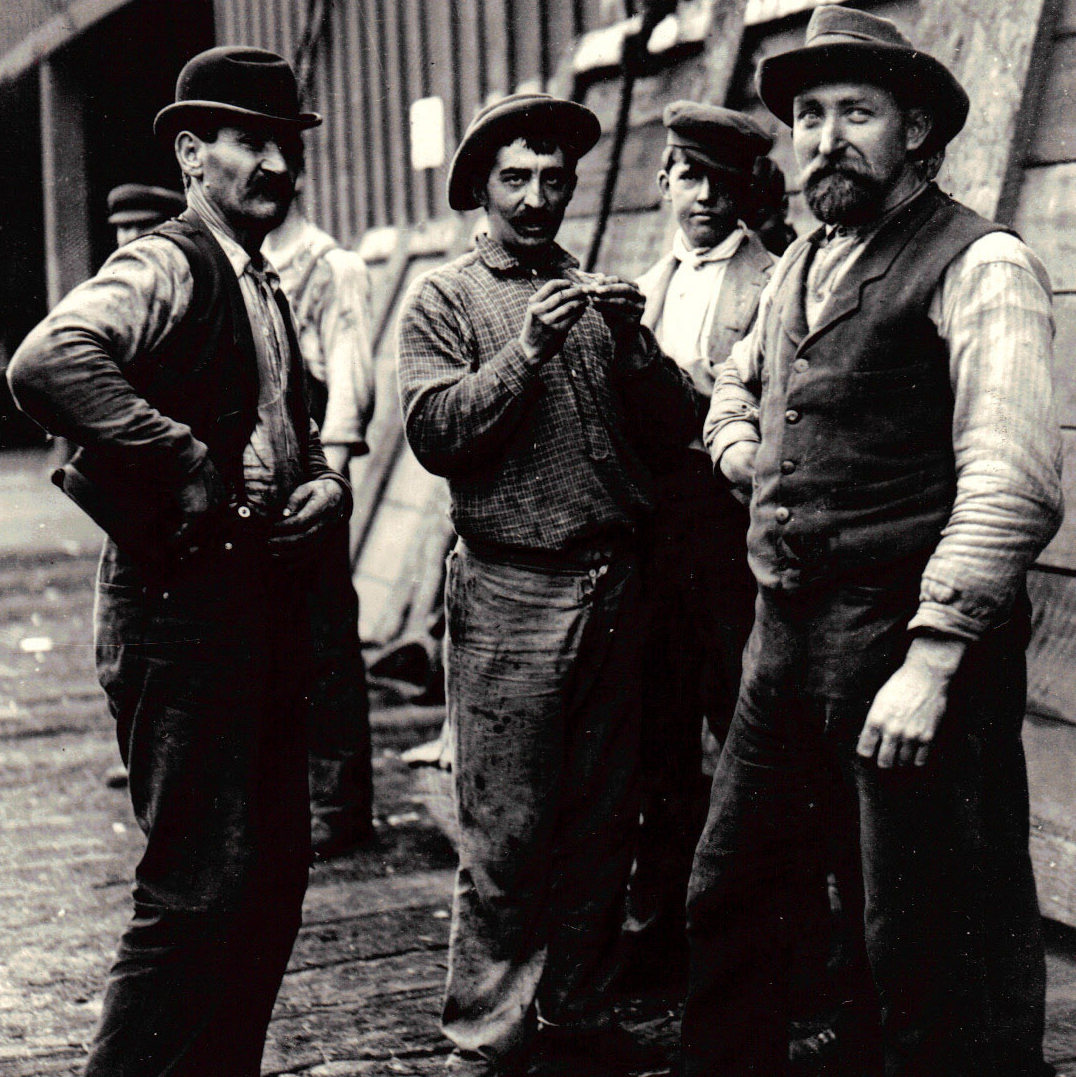
Workers on the San Francisco waterfront in 1901.

During the first decade of the 20th century, employers across America made effective use of judicial injunctions to prohibit trade unions from engaging in strikes to win recognition for themselves and wage-and-hour gains for their members. This so-called "open shop drive" put organized labor, concentrated in an array of local and international craft unions joined under the umbrella of the American Federation of Labor, on the defensive.

In San Francisco, one of the most heavily unionized cities in the country, matters came to a head in the summer of 1901 when a local employers' association, the Draymen's Association, locked out the city's unionized teamsters on July 21. The lockout spread to the entire waterfront, which saw the city's transportation essentially shut down.

Strikebreakers were imported by the employers, who were met by force, leading to calls by the employers for police assistance. In February 1901, when police were deployed by the Chief of Police, the city's 14 maritime unions joined together as the City Front Federation (which included: the Sailors' Union of the Pacific, the longshoremen's union and the Teamsters' Local Union 85) and voted to initiate a mass sympathy strike in support of the locked out teamsters, rather than see the teamsters' union crushed. Some 16,000 longshoremen, clerks, packers, and warehouse workers joined the work stoppage on July 30, thereby increasing the volatility of the situation.

San Francisco's Democratic mayor, James D. Phelan, who had been elected thanks in large measure to the support of organized labor, sided with the employers in the battle and gave the Chief of Police authorization to smash the strike. Extreme violence followed, in which picketing workers were clubbed and even shot, resulting in 5 deaths and 336 reported cases of assault. Hundreds more strikers were arrested.

The perceived "treachery" of Mayor Phelan caused San Francisco's organized labor movement to rethink its previous strategy of attempting to elect and influence its "friends" in the Democratic and Republican parties. Instead, the unions sought an independent political organization to elect their own people to positions of power so that the violence of the state would not be turned against them in a future replay of the strike of 1901.

The Union Labor Party was the result of this change of perspective.

=== Union formed ===
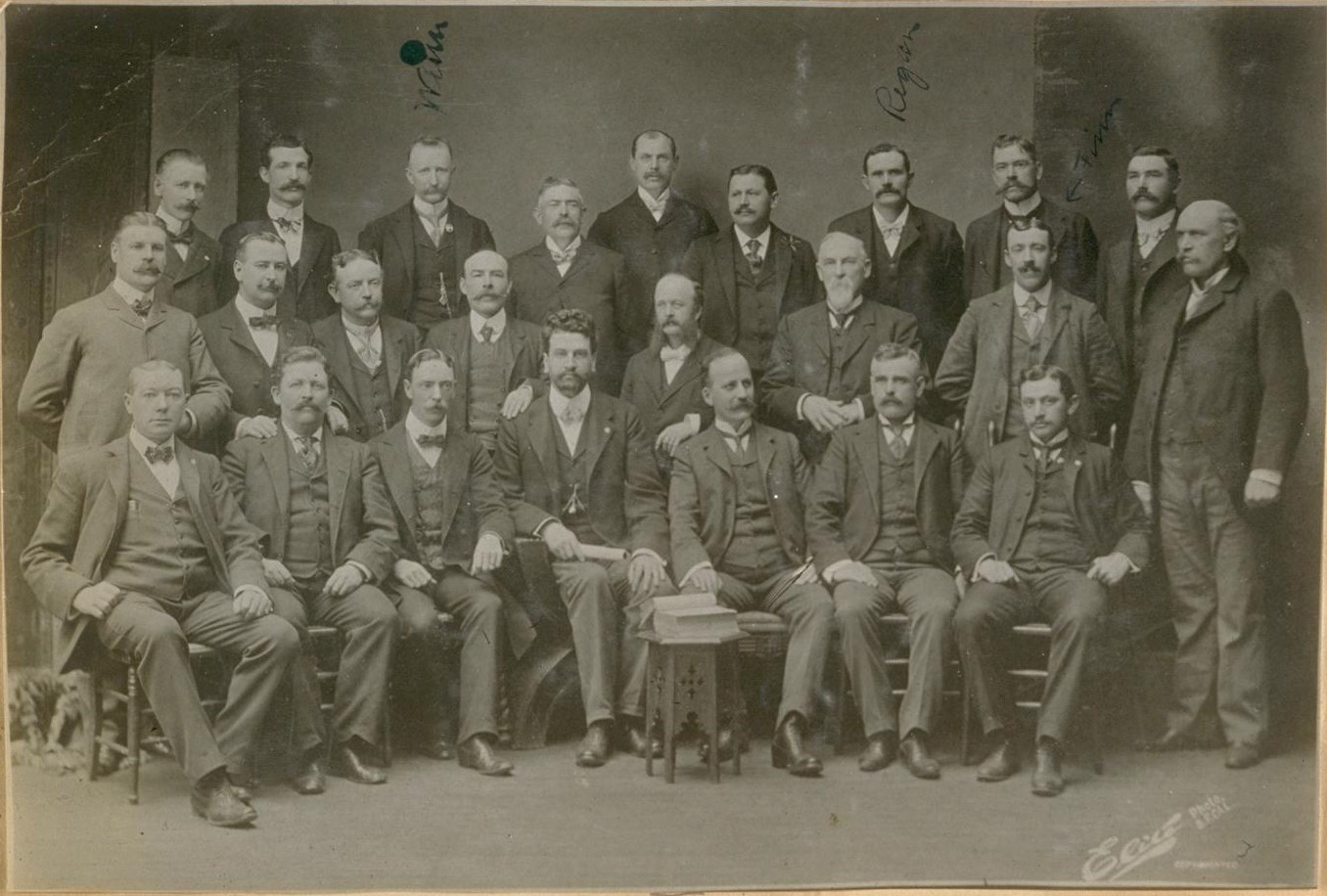
Members of the first Labor Party ticket in San Francisco, November 1901. Eugene Schmitz sits in the front row, center. Others include future Congressman William J. Wynn (top row, third from left), future Assemblyman John M. Murphy (top row, center), and future Sheriff Thomas F. Finn (middle row, second from right).

On September 5, 1901, approximately 300 delegates representing 68 of San Francisco's unions gathered together in a convention to establish the Union Labor Party of the City and County of San Francisco. The convention approved a platform including a call for the revision of the city charter to curb future intervention by the city administration in labor disputes, a demand for municipal ownership of all public utilities, building more schools and the initiation of the merit system in the promotion of teachers, and the abolition of the poll tax. The platform also contained a frankly nativist demand for the restriction of Asian immigration and the creation of segregated schools for Asian children.

The new political party nominated Eugene E. Schmitz, president of the Musicians' Union, as its candidate for Mayor. He was backed by lawyer and political boss Abe Ruef, who threw his considerable influence behind Schmitz. The union put up a slate of its candidates for all other elected positions. The organization was ultimately endorsed by every San Francisco union with the exception of the local Building Trades Council and was bitterly opposed by every newspaper with the exception of the San Francisco Examiner, owned by William Randolph Hearst.

The election of November 1901 proved a great triumph for the union, with its mayoral candidate winning election by a plurality of over 4,000 votes. Three of its members were elected to the San Francisco Board of Supervisors and the group fell just 50 votes short of electing 3 more.

One month before the election, the teamsters' strike was finally settled following the intervention of Governor Henry T. Gage. The terms of the agreement between labor and capital were not made public, but Philip S. Foner claimed it as a victory for the workers in 1947, asserting that strikebreakers were discharged and the striking unionized workers were reinstated, the Teamsters Union was recognized, the union wage scale initiated, and the 48-hour week established. Writing in 1952, Walton Bean was less optimistic, characterizing it as a defeat for the workers and pointing to the fact that the union demand for a closed shop was not granted. In 2010, Laurence H. Shoup stated that "in many ways the agreement represented a compromise," but felt the unions came out stronger than the Employers' Association, which failed to break union power entirely and disbanded soon after the strike.

=== The ULP in power ===
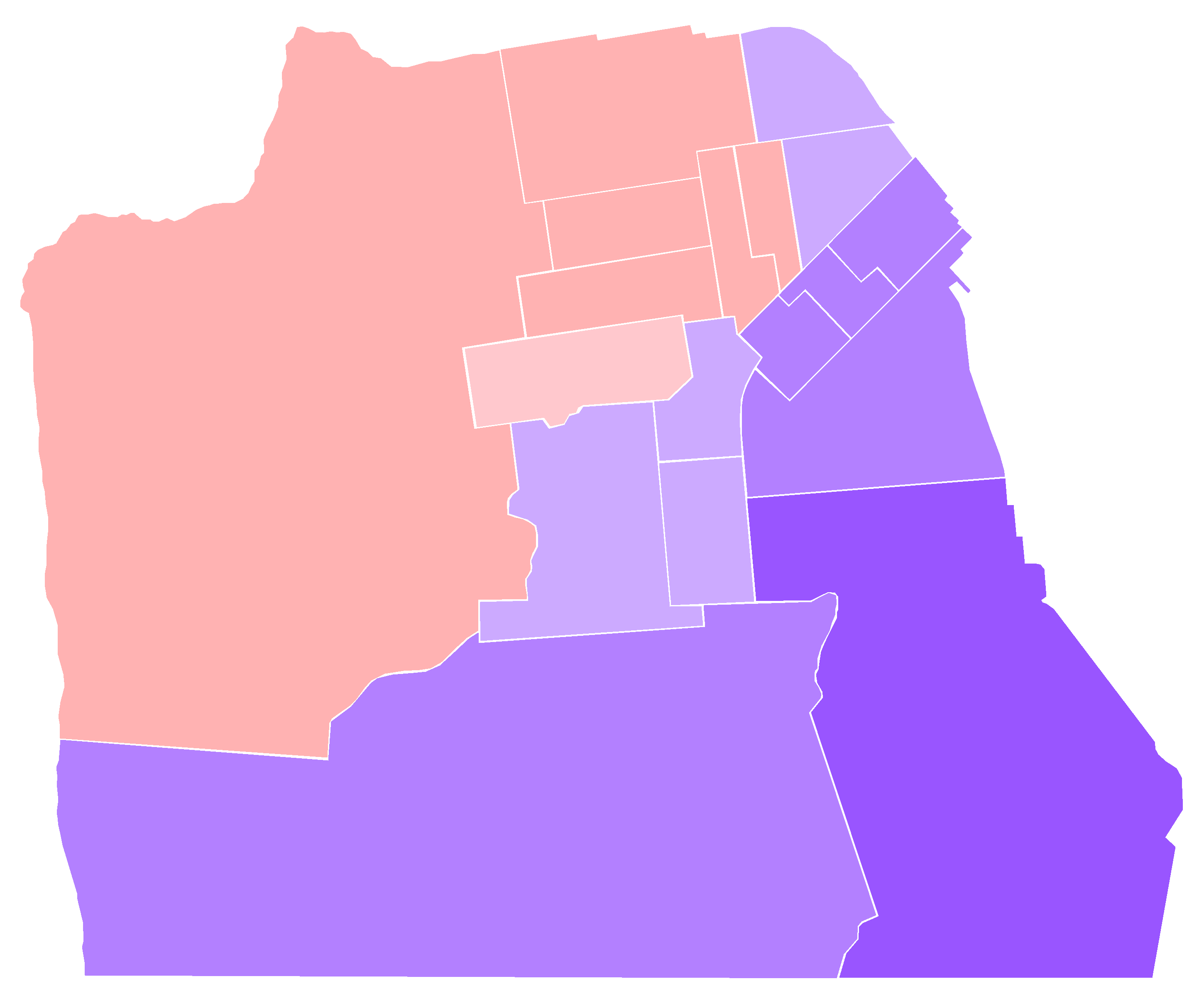
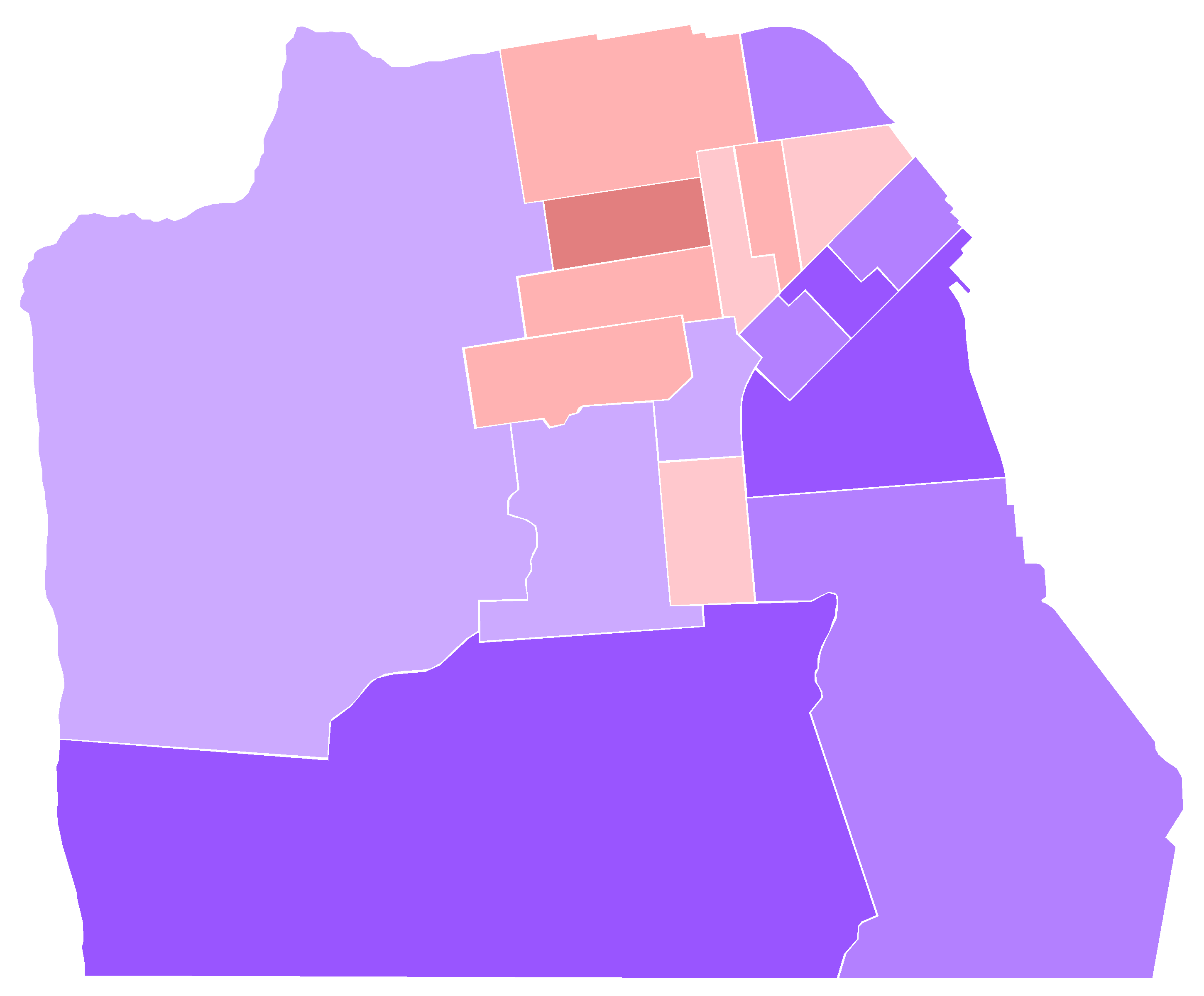
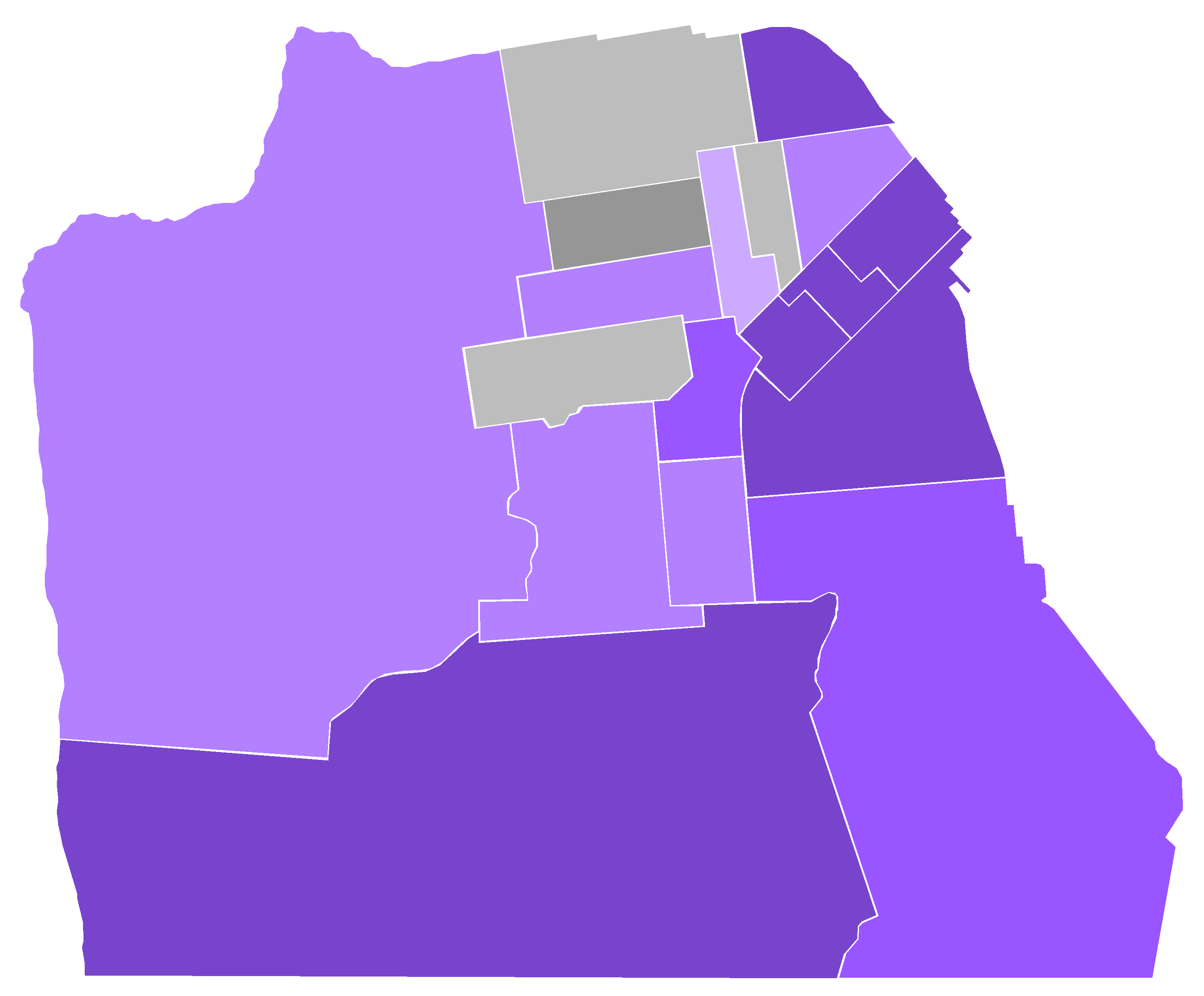
Results of the 1901, 1903, and 1905 San Francisco mayoral elections by State Assembly district.

With City Hall in the hands of the Union Labor Party, San Francisco's trade unions launched a series of successful strikes in 1902. The city's streetcar employees launched a strike to reverse a 1901 wage cut and to win union recognition, an action which snarled San Francisco's internal transportation. The United Railway Company, employer of the streetcar workers, attempted to import strikebreakers, but this time the ULP Mayor of San Francisco prohibited the company's request for a police guard and ordered that no special permits be granted for security guards to carry firearms. Eight days later, the company signed a contract with its employees which granted all of the union's demands.

Despite some misgivings on the part of Samuel Gompers and other national officials of the American Federation of Labor, the ULP continued its electoral success in 1903, when Eugene Schmitz was renominated for Mayor of San Francisco and won re-election by more than 6,000 votes.

Anti-union forces may have been defeated in the elections, but by no means was there an end to their own organizing. In 1904 there came to San Francisco a new organization known as the Citizen's Alliance, headed by Herbert George, one of the city's leaders of the open shop movement. George initially launched the Citizens' Alliance in Denver, Colorado with great success before importing the organization to the less hospitable soil of the city by the bay. By the end of 1904, George's organization claimed a membership of 16,000, including employers pledged to restore "the Americanism of the Open Shop in San Francisco."

"Flashlight photograph taken of the Union Labor Party's convention in the Turk-Street Temple last night, and the officers who conducted the proceedings." The San Francisco Call, October 1, 1905

In the election of 1905, the Citizens' Alliance sought to fragment the union opposition by launching a puppet organization called the United Labor League. The Citizens' Alliance counted on a split of the labor movement, centered around the conservative Building Trades Council headed by P.H. McCarthy, against which would be pitted a fusion candidate combining the forces of the Republicans and the Democrats under the slogan of "Law and Order."

Contrary to the best-laid plans of the open shop advocates, McCarthy and the previously resistant Building Trades Council united behind Schmitz and the Union Labor Party in the election of 1905, helping him to win a third term of office.

=== The ULP in retreat ===
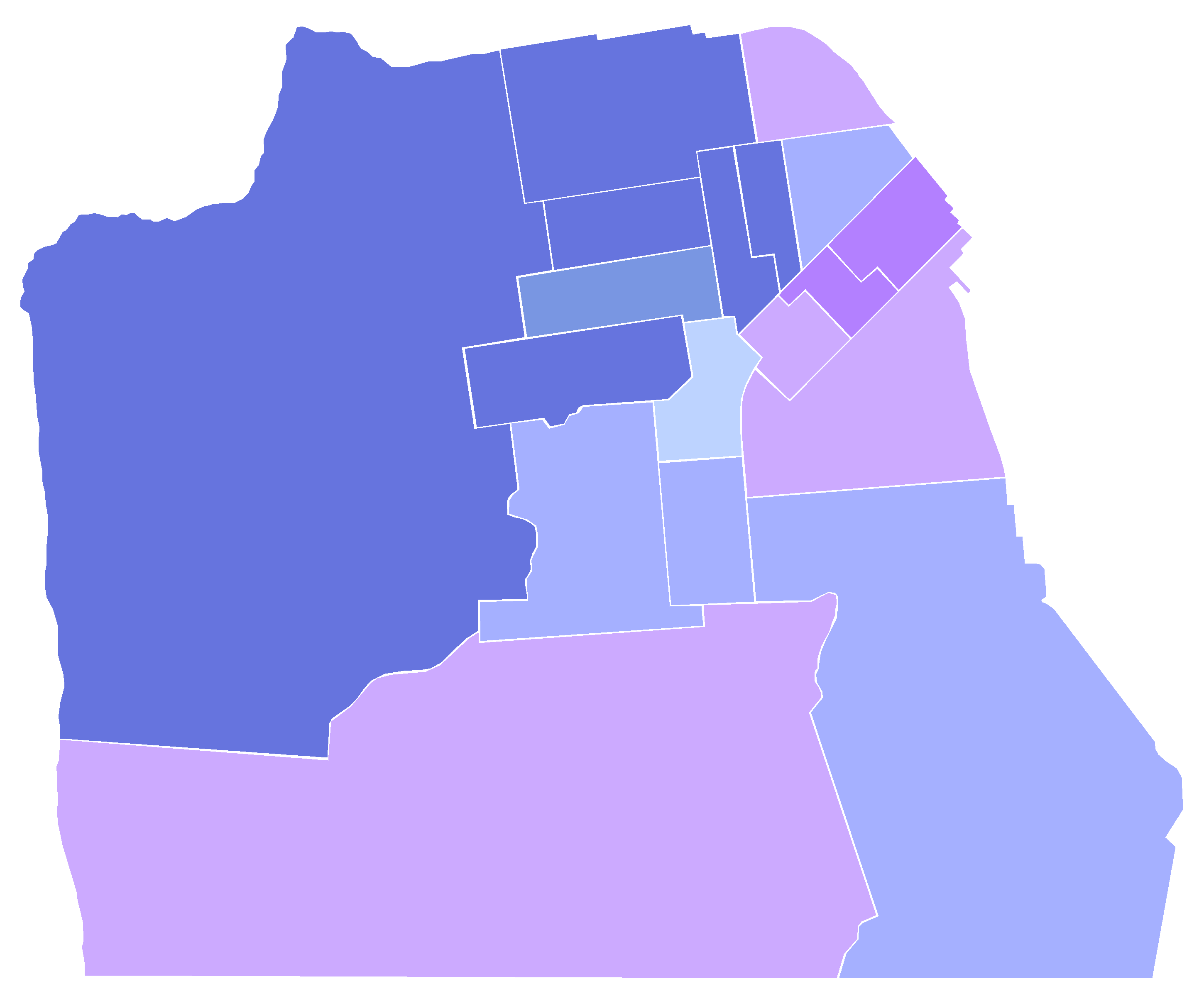
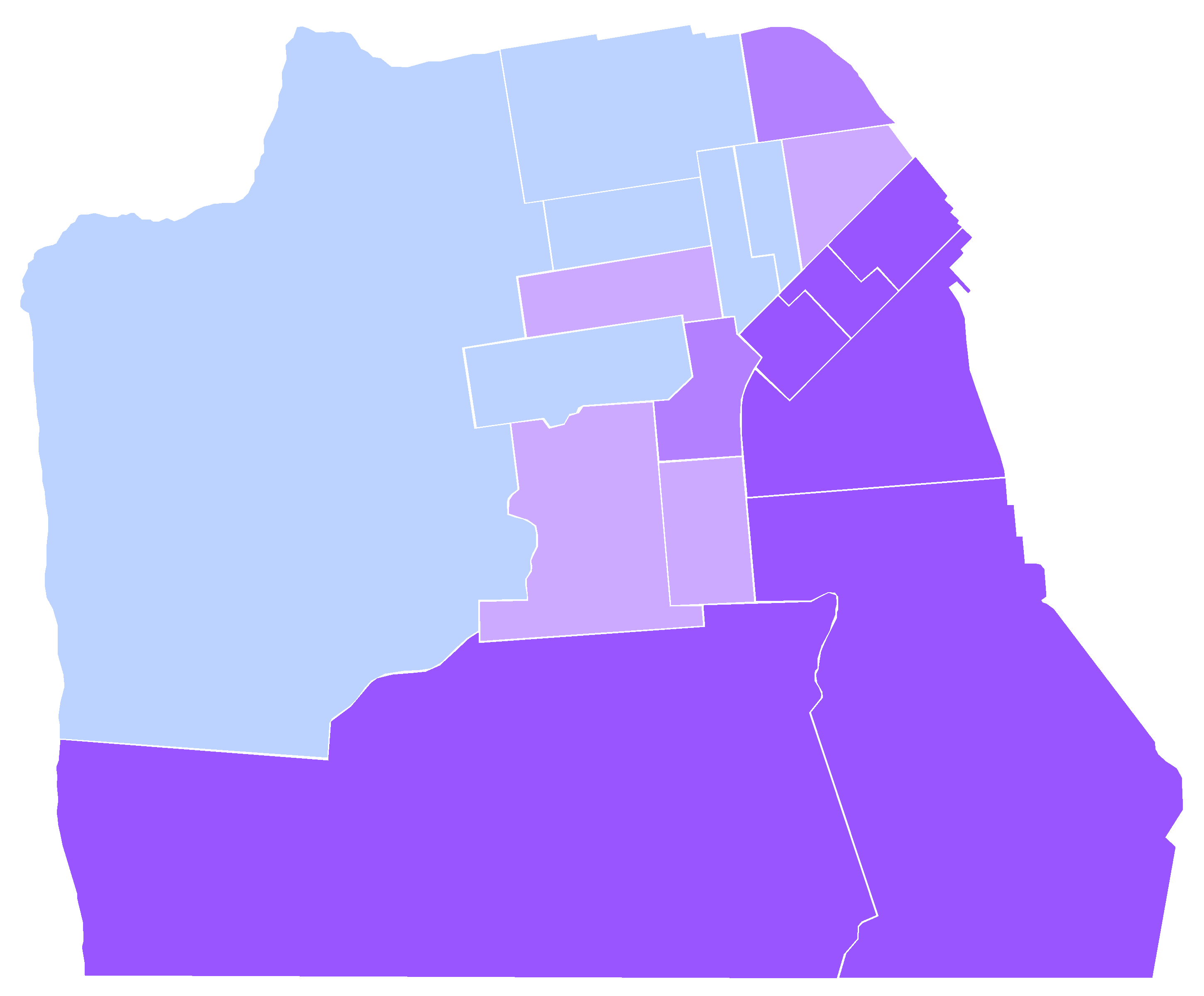
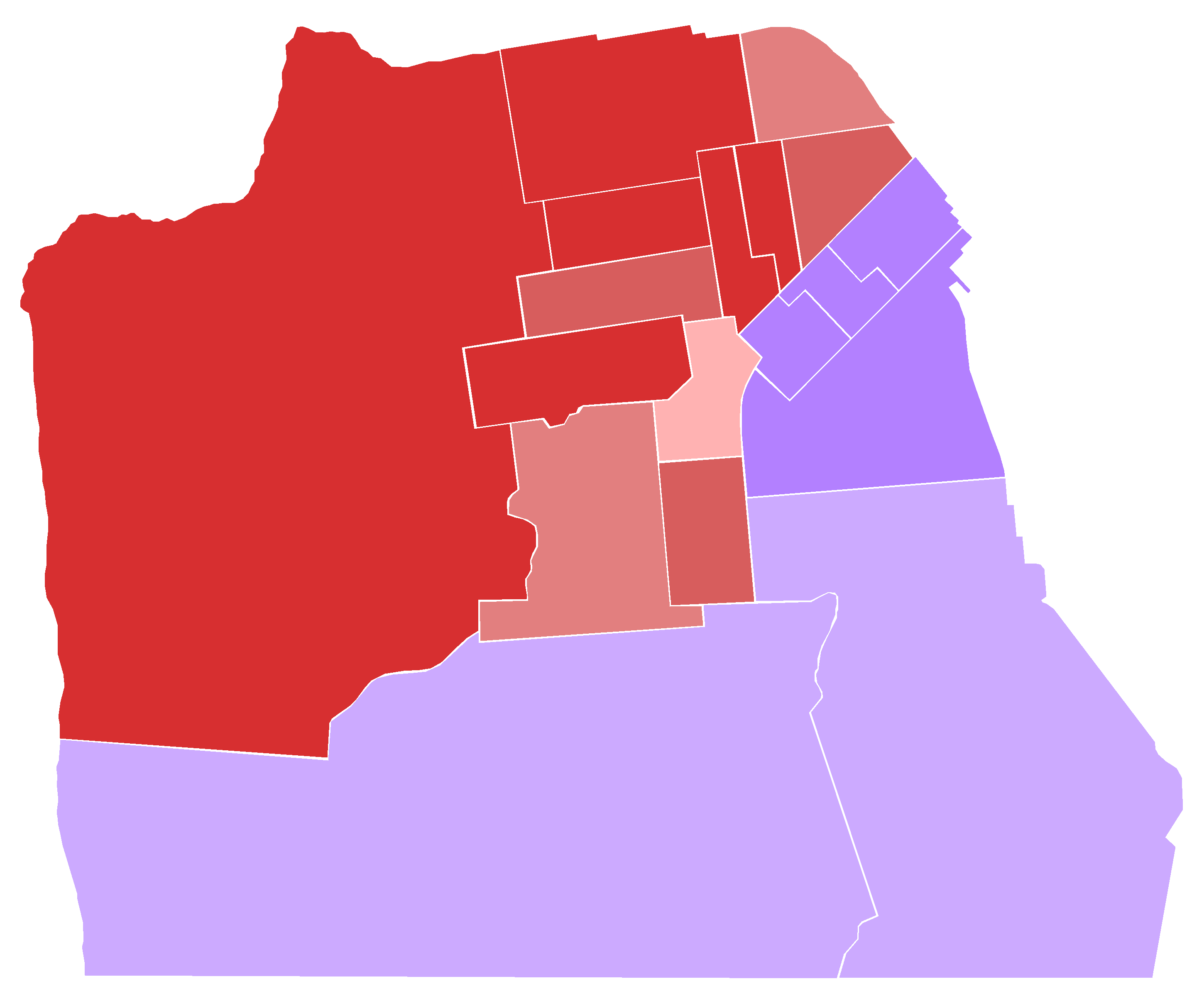
Results of the 1907, 1909, and 1911 San Francisco mayoral elections by State Assembly district.

The year 1907 marked a turning point for the Union Labor Party. In that year, a series of revelations took place detailing graft and corruption in municipal administration, culminating in an investigation and prosecution that showed that the Union Labor Party and the city's Mayor were in the control of political boss Abe Ruef, who received financial kickbacks in the guise of legal fees from public utilities, gambling houses, and houses of prostitution. The fall of Mayor Eugene Schmitz in the midst of the San Francisco Streetcar Strike of 1907 undermined the strike effort, which ended in utter failure after months of violence between the Carmen's Union and out-of-town mercenary strikebreakers. That November, Democrat Edward Robeson Taylor was elected mayor against McCarthy as the Union Labor candidate. Two years later, however, Taylor did not run for reelection and McCarthy was elected. Soon after San Francisco adopted non-partisan elections and in 1911 businessmen chose James Rolph Jr., known as "Sunny Jim", to run against McCarthy. Rolph won the election and the ULP faded from the scene.

While little different from the corruption in other major American cities, such as Pittsburgh, Cleveland, Philadelphia, St. Louis, Chicago, and New York, the San Francisco city graft scandal drew deafening wails of criticism from the local and national press, which sought to emphasize an inevitable connection between labor unions and official dishonesty.

== Members and endorsees ==
Alfred Roncovieri (left) and Andrew J. Gallagher, former members of the Union Labor Party who served on the San Francisco Board of Supervisors for decades after the party's collapse

=== City officials ===
- Abe Ruef, party boss (1901–1907)
- Eugene Schmitz, 26th Mayor of San Francisco (1902–1907)
- Charles Boxton, 27th Mayor of San Francisco (1907), member of the San Francisco Board of Supervisors (1899–1907)
- P. H. McCarthy, 29th Mayor of San Francisco (1910–1912)
- William Langdon, 18th District Attorney of San Francisco (1906–1910), San Francisco Superintendent of Schools (1903–1906)
- Charles Fickert, 19th District Attorney of San Francisco (1910–1920)
- Thomas F. Finn, Sheriff of San Francisco (1910–1912, 1916–1928), California State Senator (1909–1917), member of the San Francisco Board of Supervisors (1904–1905), California State Assemblyman (1903–1904)
- Michael Casey, President of the Board of Public Works (1903–1904, 1907–1909, 1910–1913), Commissioner of the Board of Public Works (1902–1905, 1907–1913)
- John I. Nolan, member of the San Francisco Board of Supervisors (1911–1912)
- Olaf Tveitmoe, member of the San Francisco Board of Supervisors (1907–1908)
- Lawrence J. Flaherty, member of the San Francisco Board of Police Commissioners (1911–1915)
- Alfred L. Morgenstern, member of the Alameda City Council (1911–1914)

=== State officials ===
- Richard J. Welch, California State Senator (1901–1913)
- Harry Bunkers, California State Senator (1903–1905)
- Frank A. Markey, California State Senator (1905–1909)
- George B. Keane, California State Senator (1905–1909)
- Daniel J. Reily, California State Senator (1907–1911)
- Gus Hartman, California State Senator (1907–1911)
- Marc Anthony, California State Senator (1907–1911)
- John M. Murphy, California State Assemblyman (1903–1905)
- Abner McMahon, California State Assemblyman (1903–1905)
- Charles A. Siskron, California State Assemblyman (1903–1905)
- Jay N. Copus, California State Assemblyman (1903–1905)
- Matthew J. Kerrigan, California State Assemblyman (1903–1905)
- Augustus M. Mahany, California State Assemblyman (1903–1905)
- John A. Cullen, California State Assemblyman (1905–1911)
- Patrick J. Boyle, California State Assemblyman (1905–1909)
- Samuel H. Beckett, California State Assemblyman (1905–1909)
- Mel Vogel, California State Assemblyman (1905–1909)
- Louis Strohl, California State Assemblyman (1905–1909)
- Peter J. Kelly, California State Assemblyman (1907–1909)
- James A. Wilson, California State Assemblyman (1907–1909)
- Daniel J. Toomey, California State Assemblyman (1907–1909)
- Paul F. Fratessa, California State Assemblyman (1907–1909)
- John McKeon, California State Assemblyman (1907–1909)
- Fred Hugo Hartman, California State Assemblyman (1907–1909)
- Dennis W. Barry, California State Assemblyman (1907–1909)
- Henry Thompson, California State Assemblyman (1907–1909)
- Samuel T. Kohlman, California State Assemblyman (1907–1909)
- Dominic Joseph Beban, California State Assemblyman (1907–1911)
- George J. Hans, California State Assemblyman (1907–1911)
- John Morton Eshleman, California State Assemblyman (1907–1909)
- George J. Black, California State Assemblyman (1909–1911)
- James Edward Hopkins, California State Assemblyman (1909–1911)
- Charles A. Nelson, California State Assemblyman (1909–1911)

=== Federal officials ===
- Edward J. Livernash, U.S. Representative (1903–1905)
- William J. Wynn, U.S. Representative (1903–1905), member of the San Francisco Board of Supervisors (1902–1903)

=== Other members ===
- Isadore Less, original party founder
- Andrew Furuseth, President of the International Seamen's Union
- Walter Macarthur, editor of the Coast Seamen's Journal
- James H. Roxburgh, Secretary of the San Francisco Pressmens' Union
- Emma Maria Harrington, first woman registered to vote in San Francisco
- Horace J. Jackson, California State Assemblyman (1881–1883)
- William J. Kenney, candidate for State Senator (1902)
- E. J. Reynolds, candidate for State Senator (1902)

== Electoral history ==
=== Federal Offices ===
U.S. Senate				U.S. House of Representatives						
Year	Nominee	# votes	% votes	Election	Nominee(s)	Votes		Seats (Party and Endorsed)		Control
1903	Eugene Schmitz	7	6.09 / 100	1902	Edward J. Livernash (4th); William J. Wynn (5th) (Note: Both were nominated by the Union Labor Party on September 12th and 16th respectively, with the Democratic Party endorsing both candidates on the 22nd.)	38,858	13.35 / 100	2 / 8	▲2	Republican
1905	No candidate			1904	Edward J. Livernash (4th); Charles J. Williams (5th) (Note: Livernash was again nominated by the Union Labor and Democratic Parties on September 20th and August 22nd respectively. Rep. William Wynn had previously been nominated by the Union Labor Party in 1902, but was refused their nomination for a second term on September 15th in favor of Williams, despite an earlier endorsement by the Democratic Party on August 23rd.)	13,728	4.19 / 100	0 / 8	▼2	Republican
1907	No seat up			1906	Julius Kahn (4th); Everis A. Hayes (5th) (Note: Both were nominated by District Conventions on September 21st.)	28,208	10.63 / 100	2 / 8	▲2	Republican
1909	No candidate			1908	James G. Maguire (4th); George A. Tracy (5th) (Note: George Tracy received the endorsement of the Union Labor Party on September 14th, after having previously won endorsements by the Democratic (September 10th) and Independence (September 1st) Parties; initially the nomination in the 4th District had been left open, but a later District Convention endorsed James Maguire on September 21st, who had been nominated by the Democratic Party (September 3rd).)	32,028	8.55 / 100	0 / 8	▼2	Republican
1911	No candidate			1910	No candidates					

=== State Offices ===
Governor						Lieutenant governor						Secretary of State					
Year	Nominee	# votes	% votes	Fusion	Place	Year	Nominee	# votes	% votes	Fusion	Place	Year	Nominee	# votes	% votes	Fusion	Place
1902	No Candidate					1902	No Candidate					1902	No Candidate				
1906	Theodore Bell	117,625	37.70 / 100	Democratic	2nd	1906	Thomas O. Toland	108,493	35.93 / 100	Democratic	2nd	1906	Charles F. Curry	168,280	56.77 / 100	Republican	Re-elected
1910	No Candidate					1910	No Candidate					1910	No Candidate				
Controller						Treasurer						Attorney General					
Year	Nominee	# votes	% votes	Fusion	Place	Year	Nominee	# votes	% votes	Fusion	Place	Year	Nominee	# votes	% votes	Fusion	Place
1902	No Candidate					1902	No Candidate					1902	No Candidate				
1906	Edward P. Colgan	190,407	64.72 / 100	Republican	Re-elected	1906	F.E. Haskell	12,619	4.30 / 100	Union-Labor	5th	1906	W.O. Morton	94,991	32.24 / 100	Democratic	2nd
1910	No Candidate					1910	No Candidate					1910	No Candidate				
Surveyor-General						Clerk of the Supreme Court						Superintendent of Public Instruction					
Year	Nominee	# votes	% votes	Fusion	Place	Year	Nominee	# votes	% votes	Fusion	Place	Year	Nominee	# votes	% votes	Fusion	Place
1902	No Candidate					1902	No Candidate					1902	No Candidate				
1906	William S. Kinsbury	161,307	55.17 / 100	Republican	Elected	1906	C.M. Haybl	91,956	31.61 / 100	Democratic	2nd	1906	Anna Williams	96,183	32.72 / 100	Democratic	2nd
1910	No Candidate					1910	No Candidate					1910	No Candidate				
Superintendent of State Printing						Chief Justice of the Supreme Court						Associate Justices of the Supreme Court					
Year	Nominee	# votes	% votes	Fusion	Place	Year	Nominee	# votes	% votes	Fusion	Place	Year	Nominee(s)	# votes	% votes	Fusion	Place
1902	No Candidate					1902	No Candidate					1902	No Candidates				
1906	William W. Shannon	163,197	55.83 / 100	Republican	Elected	1906	Not Up					1906	William G. Lorigan	147,390	26.68 / 100	Republican	Re-elected
1906	William W. Shannon	163,197	55.83 / 100	Republican	Elected	1906	Not Up					1906	Frank J. Murrasky	112,983	20.45 / 100	Democratic	N/A
1906	William W. Shannon	163,197	55.83 / 100	Republican	Elected	1906	Not Up					1906	M. C. Sloss	148,049	54.86 / 100	Republican	Elected
1910	No Candidate					1910	No Candidate					1910	No Candidates				

California Senate							California Assembly						
Election	Nominees (and Endorsees)	Votes		Seats (Party and Endorsed)		Control	Election	Nominees (and Endorsees)	Votes		Seats (Party and Endorsed)		Control
Election	Nominees (and Endorsees)	No.	Share	No.	±	Control	Election	Nominees (and Endorsees)	No.	Share	No.	±	Control
1902	4 UL; 1 D	11,110	8.12% (Note: Of 136,876 votes)	1 / 40 (Note: Representing Harry Bunkers (18th))	▲1	Republican	1902	12 UL; 13 D	29,004	10.56% (Note: Of 274,606 votes)	7 / 80 (Note: Representing John Murphy (28th), Thomas Finn (29th), Abner McMahon (30th), Charles Siskron (31st), J.N. Copus (32nd), M.J. Kerrigan (33rd), A.M. Mahany (36th))	▲7	Republican
1904	3 R, 3 D	18,182	10.54% (Note: Of 172,532 votes)	4 / 40 (Note: Representing Frank Markey (17th), Harry Bunkers (18th), Richard Welch (19th), George Keane (23rd))	▲3	Republican	1904	7 UL; 4 R, 8 D	19,171	6.08% (Note: Of 315,221 votes)	4 / 80 (Note: Representing Wm. Jas. Mindham (28th), John Cullen (29th), Thomas Atkinson (39th), John Bliss (50th))	▼3	Republican
1906	1 UL; 4 R, 3 D	17,354	10.47% (Note: Of 165,697 votes)	6 / 40 (Note: Representing Frank Markey (17th), Daniel Reily (18th), Richard Welch (19th), Gus Hartman (22nd), George Keane (23rd), Marc Anthony (24th))	▲2	Republican	1906	8 UL; 16 R, 5 D	32,750	11.68% (Note: Of 280,281 votes)	14 / 80 (Note: Representing Peter Kelly (28th), John Cullen (29th), James Wilson (30th), Daniel Toomey (31st), Patrick Boyle (32nd), Paul Fratessa (33rd), F. Hugo Hartmann (35th), Dennis Barry (37th), Samuel Beckett (38th), Henry Thomas (40th), Mel Vogel (44th), Louis Strohl (45th), George Hans (51st), John Eshleman (52nd))	▲10	Republican
1908	3 R, 1 D	13,574	8.15% (Note: Of 166,610 votes)	7 / 40 (Note: Representing Thos F. Finn (17th), Daniel Reily (18th), R.J. Welch (19th), Ed Wolfe (21st), Gus Hartman (22nd), John Hare (23rd), Marc Anthony (24th))	▲1	Republican	1908	4 UL; 14 R, 4 D, 1 IL	34,039	9.27% (Note: Of 367,274 votes)	15 / 80 (Note: Representing T.D. Johnson (22nd), Walter Macauley (28th), John Cullen (29th), George J. Black (30th), James E. Hopkins (31st), Charles A. Nelson (32nd), Florence J. O'Neill (34th), Fred C. Gerdes (35th), Henry N. Beatty (36th), William C. Pugh (38th), Nathan C. Coghlan (41st), D.J. Beban (43rd), George M. Perine (44th), Thos. H. Silver (46th), James T. Feeley (48th))	▲1	Republican
1910	1 R	3,939	2.01% (Note: Of 196,339 votes)	5 / 40 (Note: Representing George J. Hans (14th), Thos F. Finn (17th), R.J. Welch (19th), Ed Wolfe (21st), John Hare (23rd))	▼2	Republican	1910	1 UL; 2 R, 1 D	8,943	2.57% (Note: Of 347,427 votes)	3 / 80 (Note: Representing George Fitzgerald (49th), Frank M. Smith (51st), Charles B. Rosendale (59th))	▼12	Republican

=== Local Offices ===
Mayoralty of San Francisco
Year	Nominee	# votes	% votes	Fusion	Place
1901	Eugene Schmitz	21,776	40.71 / 100	Union Labor	Elected
1903	Eugene Schmitz	26,016	43.87 / 100	Union Labor	Re-elected
1905	Eugene Schmitz	40,191	56.58 / 100	Union Labor	Re-elected
1907	P. H. McCarthy	17,617	30.52 / 100	Union Labor	2nd
1909	P. H. McCarthy	29,437	45.34 / 100	Union Labor	Elected
1911	P. H. McCarthy	27,048	34.42 / 100	Union Labor	Lost Re-election; 2nd

== Union Labor Party municipal officials, 1902 ==
Hon. Eugene E. Schmitz, Mayor

Hon. A. Ruef, Attorney for the Mayor's Office

George B. Keane, Secretary to the Mayor

Michael Casey, Member of the Board of Public Works

Alfred Roncovieri, Member of the Board of Education

John A. Lynch, Supervisor

George B. McClellan, Supervisor

Robert J. Loughery, Supervisor

Harry W. Hutton, Police Commissioner

John Shakespeare Parry, Member of the Board Fire Commissioners

== See also ==
- San Francisco graft trials
- George L. Berry
- Peter Yorke

== Sources ==
- Bean, Walton (1952). Boss Ruef's San Francisco: The Story of the Union Labor Party, Big Business, and the Graft Prosecution. Berkeley: University of California Press.
- Foner, Philip S. (1964). History of the Labor Movement in the United States, Volume III: The Policies and Practices of the American Federation of Labor, 1900–1905. New York: International Publishers.
