= Horace J. Jackson =

American politician (1845–1915)

- "Jackson of San Francisco Receives an Ovation," an illustration of Jackson published in The San Francisco Call, August 24, 1894

Member of the California State Assembly from the 13th district
- In office January 3, 1881 – January 8, 1883
- Preceded by: Multi-member district
- Succeeded by: Multi-member district

Personal details
- Born: August 1845 New York City, U.S.
- Died: January 7, 1915 (aged 69) San Francisco, California, U.S.
- Party: Workingmen's (1877–1881); Democratic (1881–1901); Union Labor (1901–1908)
- Spouse: May
- Children: 8
- Occupation: Drayman, dockworker, politician

Military service
- Allegiance: United States
- Branch/service: United States Army
- Years of service: c. 1861–1865
- Battles/wars: Civil War

Horace J. Jackson (August 1845 – January 7, 1915) was an American drayman, dockworker and politician who served in the California State Assembly from 1881 to 1883. A founding member of the Workingmen's Party of California, he was elected in 1880 on a Workingmen's-Democratic Fusion ticket. He was later active in Democratic and Union Labor Party politics.

Jackson served in the Union Army under General George McClellan during the Civil War. He was a member of the Riggers' and Stevedores' Union and spoke in favor of the Union Labor Party shortly after its foundation. As the San Francisco Examiner wrote:

Horace Jackson of the Longshoremen's Union said the laboring man was always looking for someone in the so-called educated classes to be his master. There is no need, he said, to do so. The wageworker is intelligent enough to manage his own affairs, political or otherwise.

— San Francisco Examiner, September 4, 1901

== Caricature gallery ==
"Horace S. Jackson on the Minority Report, He Rises to a Point of Order, He Is Defeated"

"One of the Reasons Why Jackson Wants a Change of Venue"

"Jackson Waits Two Hours for M'Enerney"

"His First Visit After Adjournment"
