= John M. Murphy (California politician, born 1862) =

Irish-born American politician (1862–?)

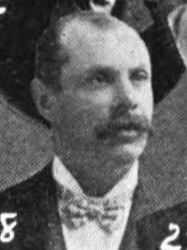
- Murphy c. 1903

Member of the California State Assembly from the 28th district district
- In office January 5, 1903 – January 5, 1905
- Preceded by: Charles R. Franklin
- Succeeded by: William James Mindham

Personal details
- Born: March 20, 1862 Ryland Villa, County Wexford, Ireland
- Party: Union Labor
- Occupation: Machinist

John Malachi Murphy (born March 20, 1862, death date unknown) was an Irish American machinist and politician who served one term in the California State Assembly for the 28th district from 1903 to 1905. Murphy was one of several candidates for the state legislature endorsed by the Union Labor Party in 1902, and the only one elected without also running as a Democrat. He was their nominee for speaker of the Assembly, receiving six votes out of 77 cast. He did not stand for re-election in 1904, having moved to Penngrove during his term.

== Biography ==
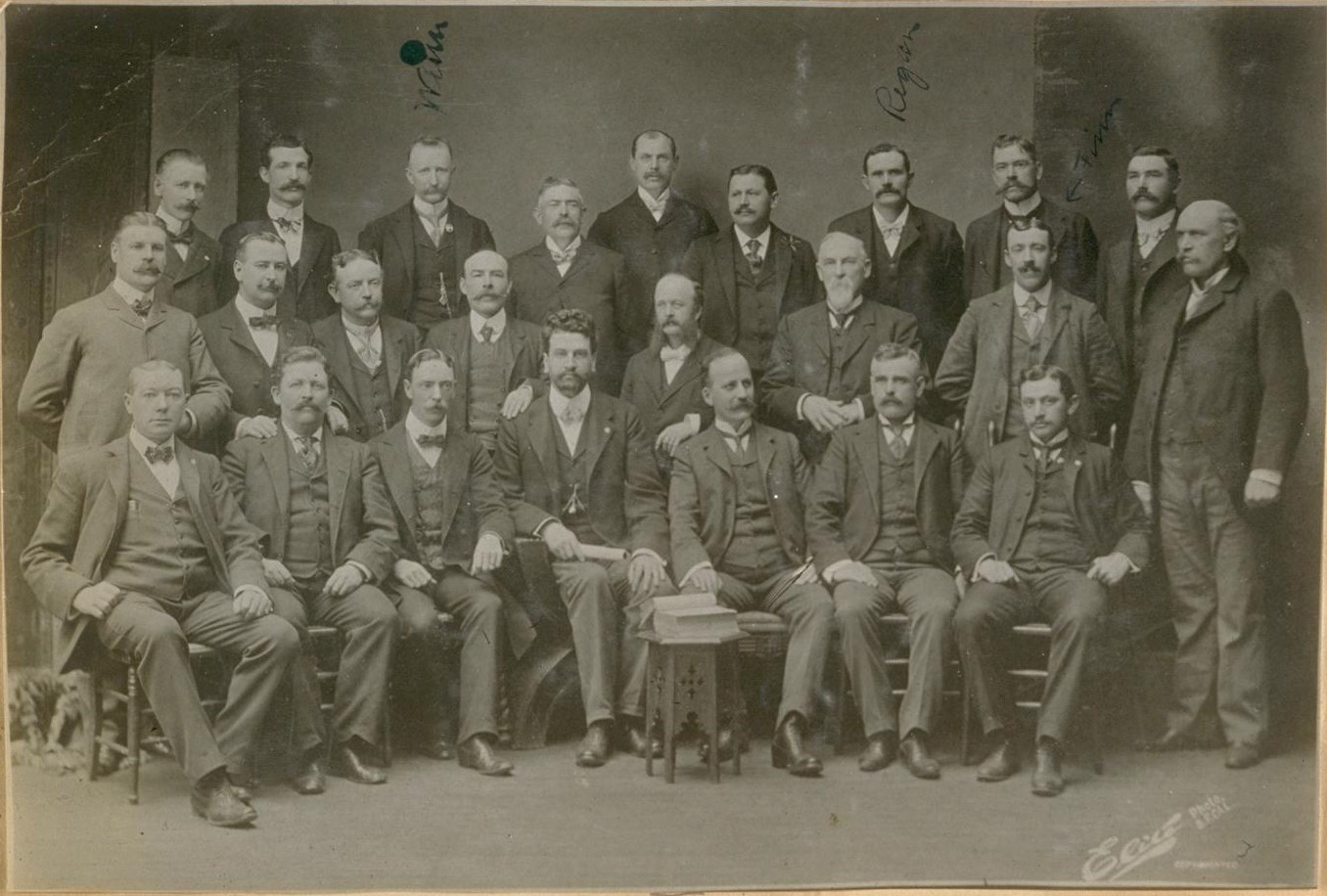
Murphy (top row, center) with other members of the first Labor Party ticket in San Francisco, November 1901

Murphy came to California in 1887 and became a naturalized citizen in San Francisco on January 5, 1891. By 1892, he was working as a machinist in the city's South of Market neighborhood. He was a founding member of the Union Labor Party in 1901 and was nominated for the San Francisco Board of Supervisors that November, but was not elected. He organized the Twenty-eighth District Union Labor Party Club the next year and served as its president, even after his election to the Assembly. During his tenure, Murphy supported the eight-hour day, direct elections of U.S. senators, the anti-injunction law, and increased funding for the University of California.

As early as 1902 Murphy was involved with a faction opposed to party boss Abe Ruef. On November 2, 1906, following the earthquake and the beginning of the graft trials in San Francisco, Murphy endorsed Independence League candidate for governor William H. Langdon and denounced Union Labor Party mayor Eugene E. Schmitz:

This man Schmitz, who is now living as a prince at the Carlton Hotel in London, may even now be trying on a crown to make complete his appearance as a Union Labor Mayor. Truly this man has lost the spirit of trade unionism if he ever possessed it.

== Electoral history ==
1902 California State Assembly 28th district election
Party	Candidate	Votes	%
Union Labor	John M. Murphy	994	40.6
Republican	Charles R. Franklin	941	38.4
Democratic	Alexander Estelita	516	21.1
Total votes		2,451	100.0
Turnout			
