= 1907 San Francisco mayoral election =

- November 5, 1907
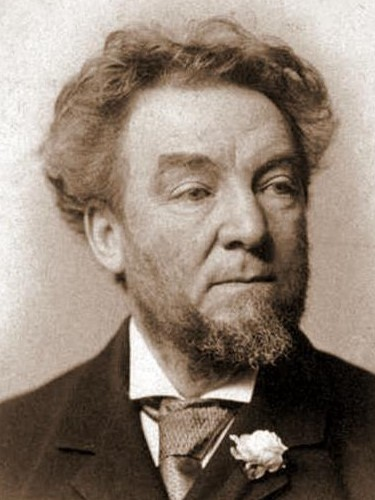

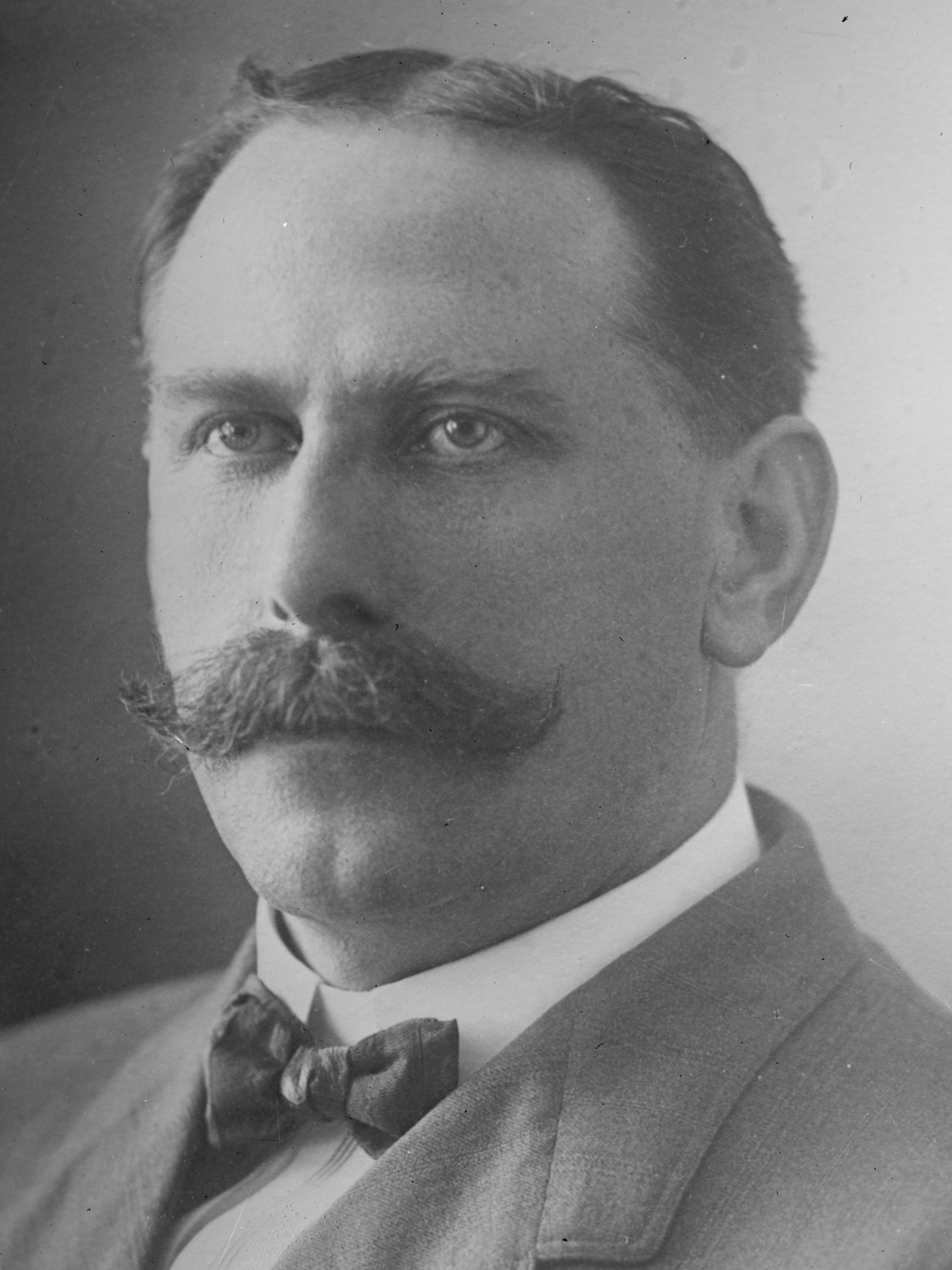

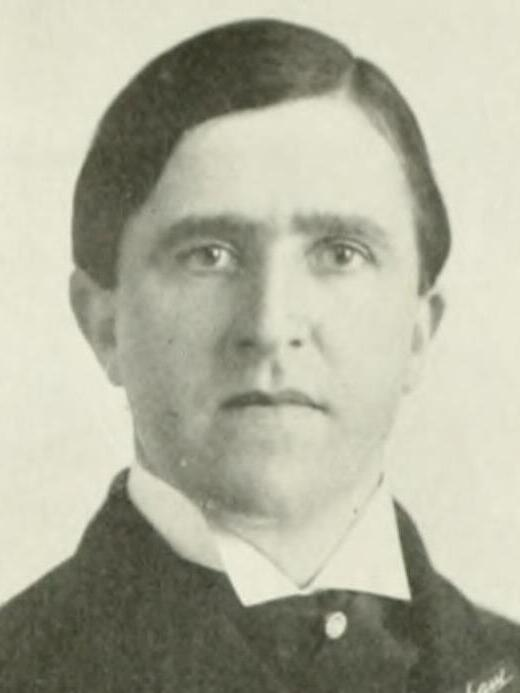
| Candidate | Edward Robeson Taylor | P. H. McCarthy | Daniel A. Ryan |
| Party | Democratic | Union Labor | Republican |
| Popular vote | 28,806 | 17,617 | 9,275 |
| Percentage | 49.90% | 30.52% | 16.07% |
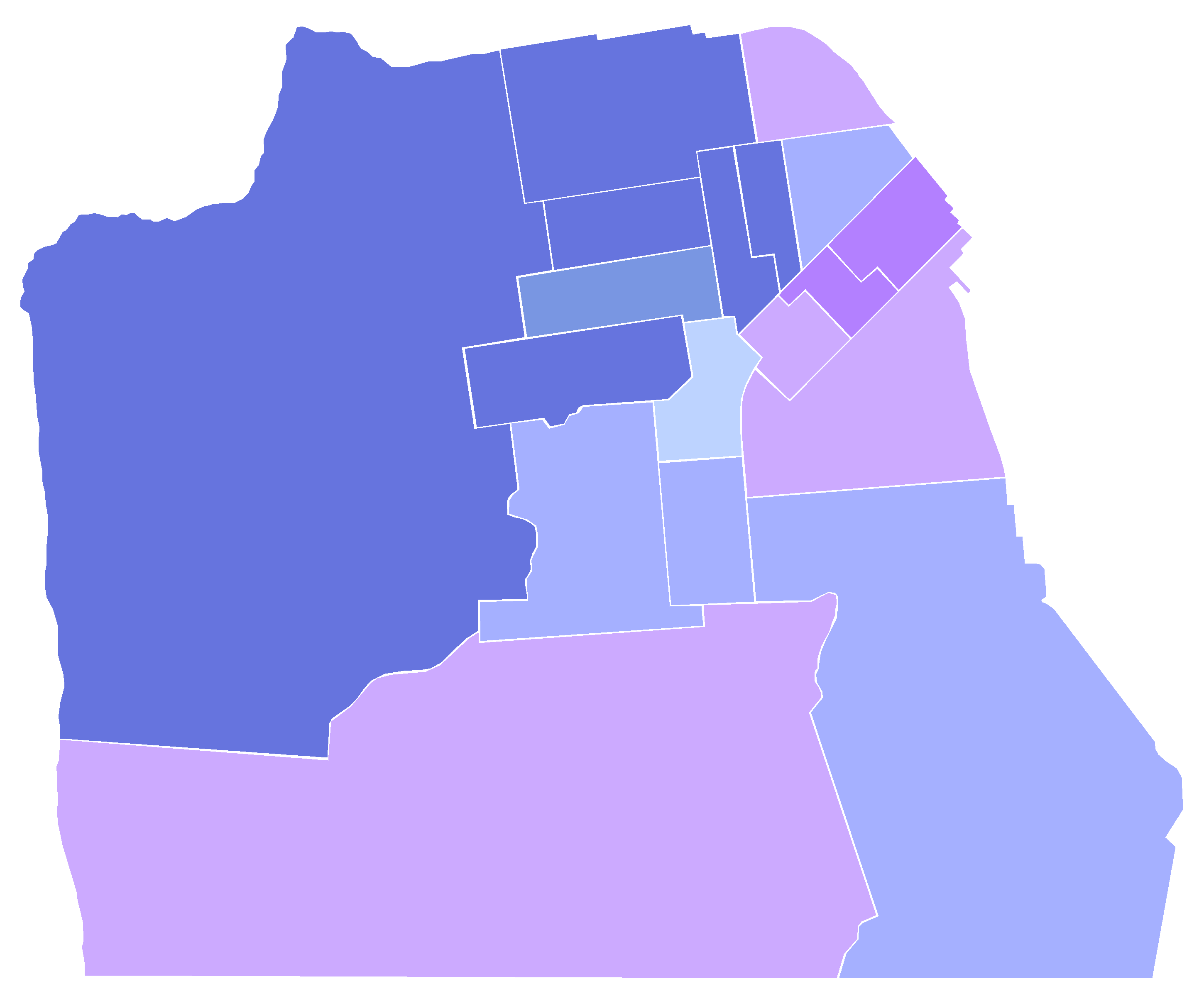
- Results by State Assembly district Taylor: 30–40% 40–50% 50–60% 60–70% McCarthy: 40–50% 50–60%
Mayor before election
Edward Robeson Taylor
Democratic
Elected Mayor
Edward Robeson Taylor
Democratic

The 1907 San Francisco mayoral election was held on November 5, 1907. Incumbent Edward Robeson Taylor was reelected with 49% of the vote.

== Results ==
1907 San Francisco mayoral election
| Party | Candidate | Votes | % |
|---|---|---|---|
| Democratic | Edward Robeson Taylor | 28,806 | 49.90% |
| Union Labor | P. H. McCarthy | 17,617 | 30.52% |
| Republican | Daniel A. Ryan | 9,275 | 16.07% |
| Socialist | Ernest L. Reguin | 1,503 | 2.60% |
| Total votes | | 57,720 | 100.00 |
| Democratic hold | | | |
