= 1911 San Francisco mayoral election =

- September 26, 1911
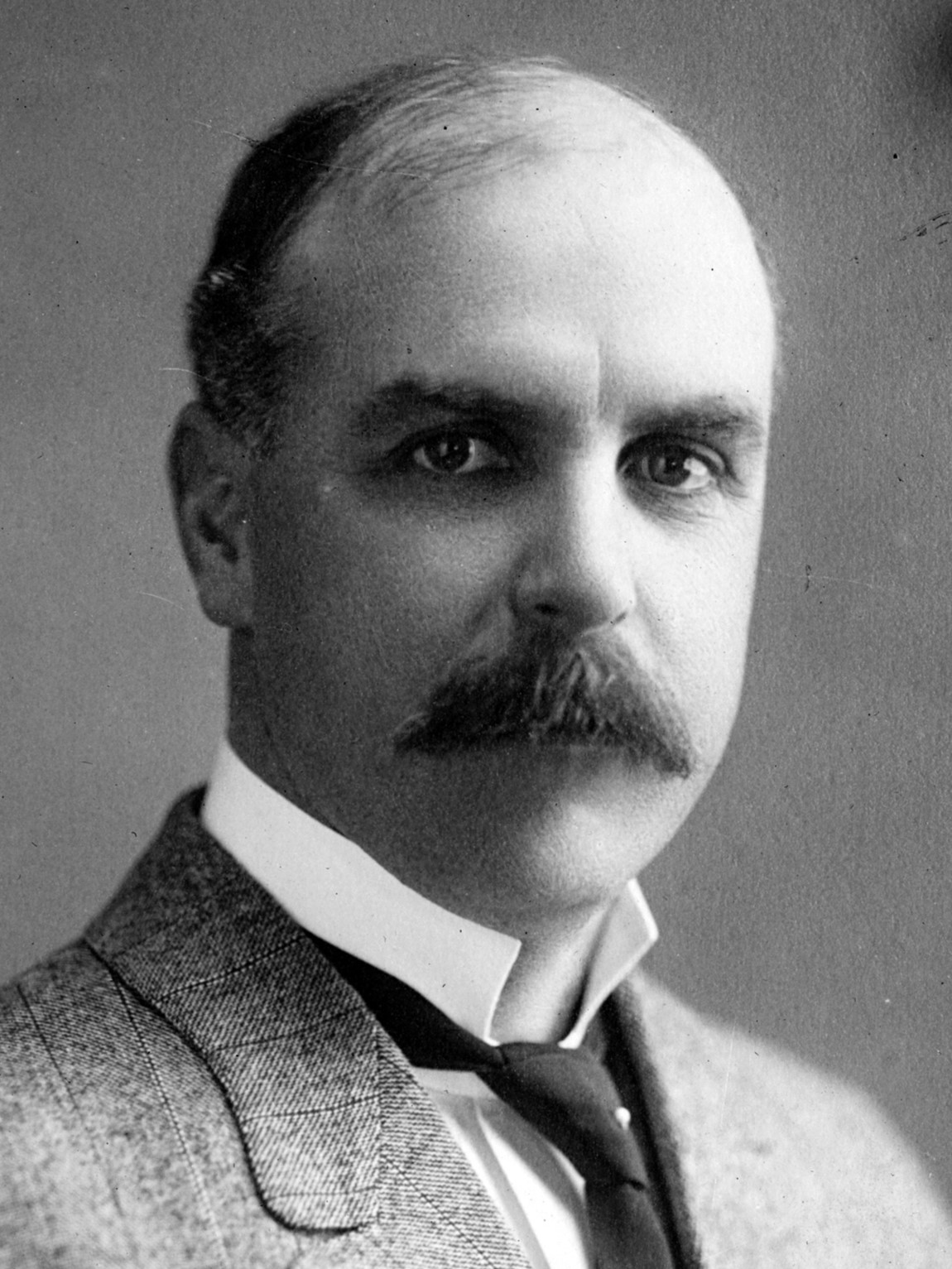

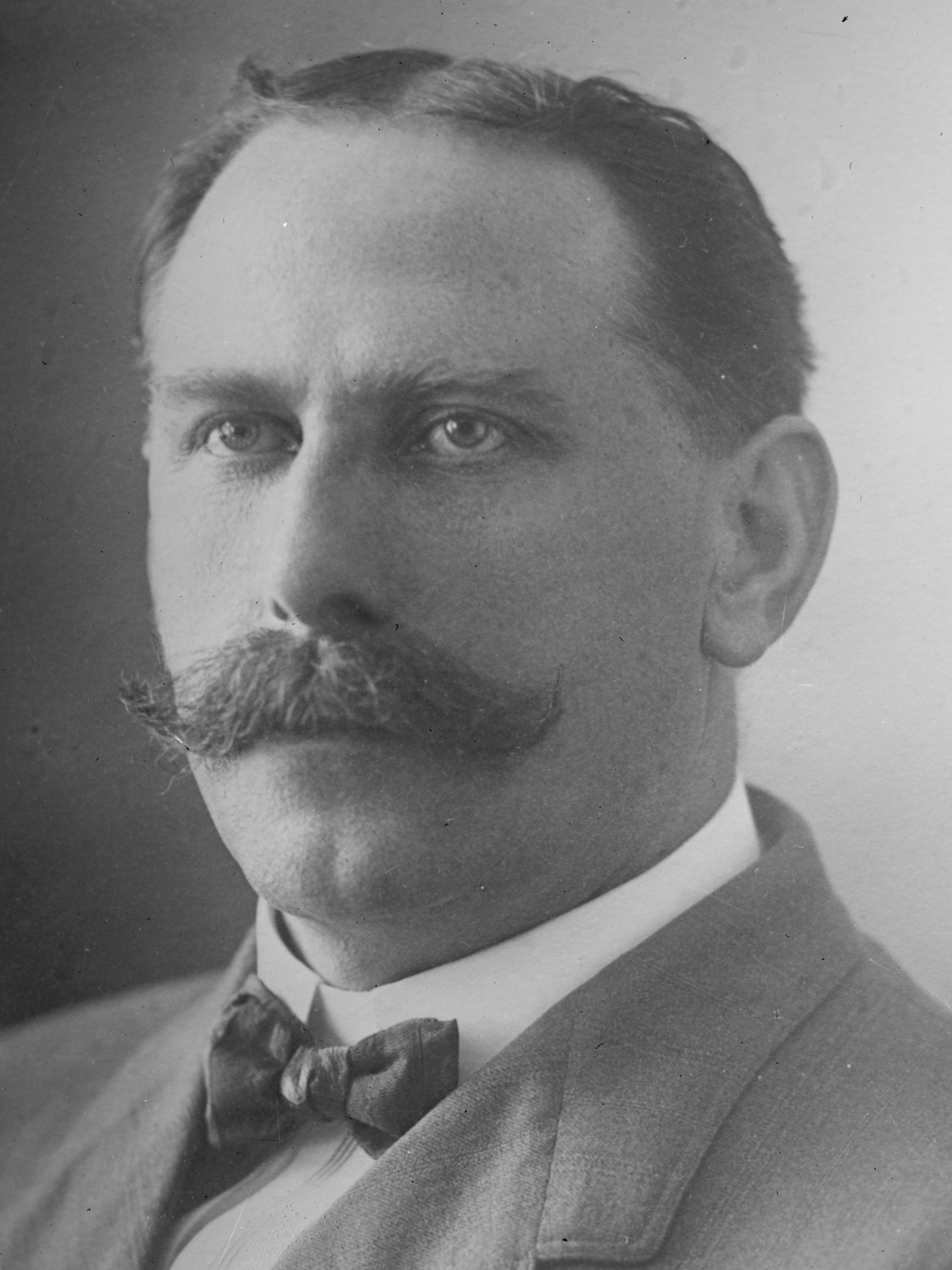
Candidate	James Rolph Jr.	P. H. McCarthy
Party	Republican	Union Labor
Popular vote	47,417	27,048
Percentage	60.34%	34.42%
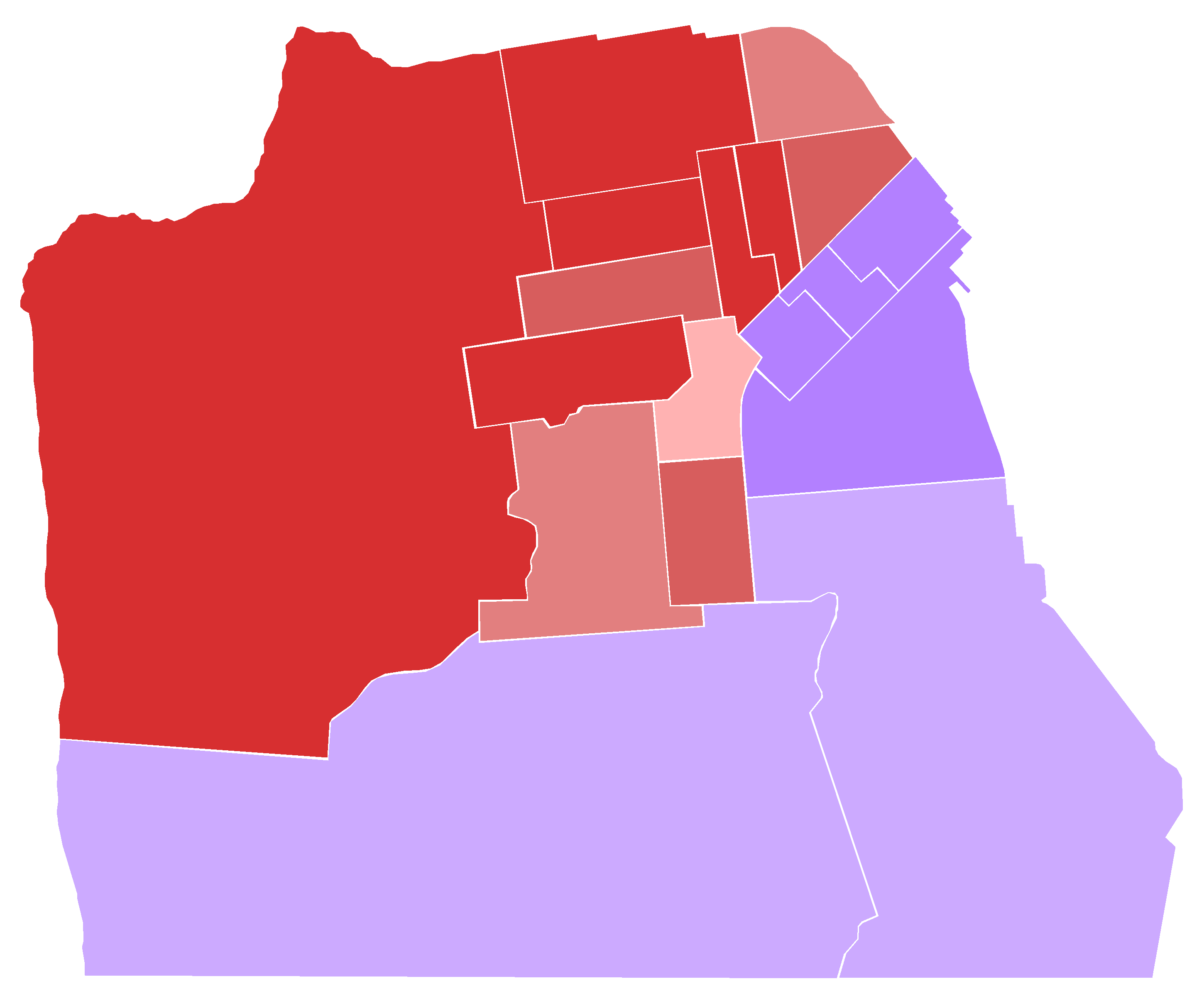
- Results by State Assembly district Rolph: 40–50% 50–60% 60–70% 70–80% McCarthy: 40–50% 50–60%
Mayor before election
P. H. McCarthy
Union Labor
Elected Mayor
James Rolph Jr.
Republican

The 1911 San Francisco mayoral election was held on September 26, 1911. James Rolph Jr. was elected with 60% of the vote. It was San Francisco's first officially non-partisan election.

== Results ==
1911 San Francisco mayoral election
Party	Candidate	Votes	%
Republican	James Rolph Jr.	47,417	60.34%
Union Labor	P. H. McCarthy	27,048	34.42%
Socialist	William McDevitt	3,858	4.91%
Nonpartisan	Fred Sibert	210	0.27%
Nonpartisan	Luigi Boggione	50	0.06%
Total votes		78,583	100.00
Republican gain from Union Labor			
