= 1905 San Francisco mayoral election =

Narrow win for incumbent

- November 7, 1905
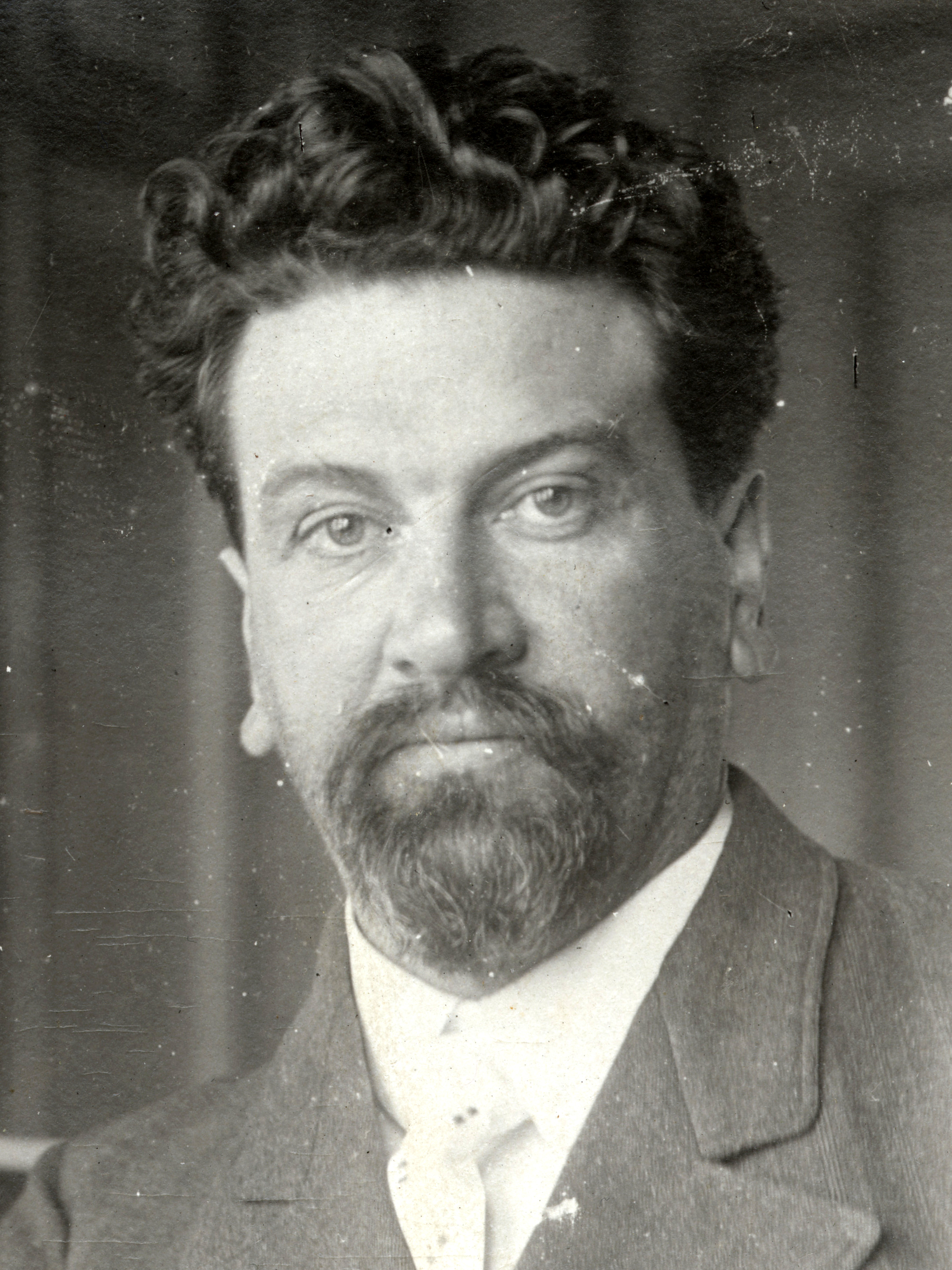

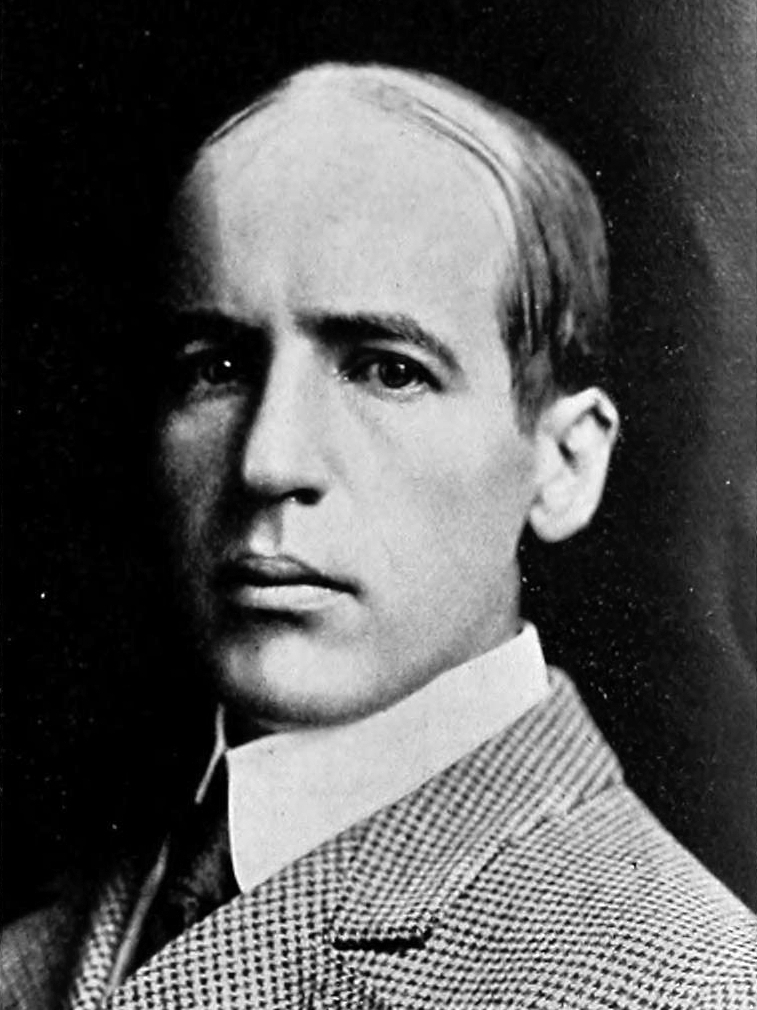
Candidate	Eugene E. Schmitz	John S. Partridge
Party	Union Labor	Fusion
Popular vote	40,191	28,687
Percentage	56.58%	40.39%
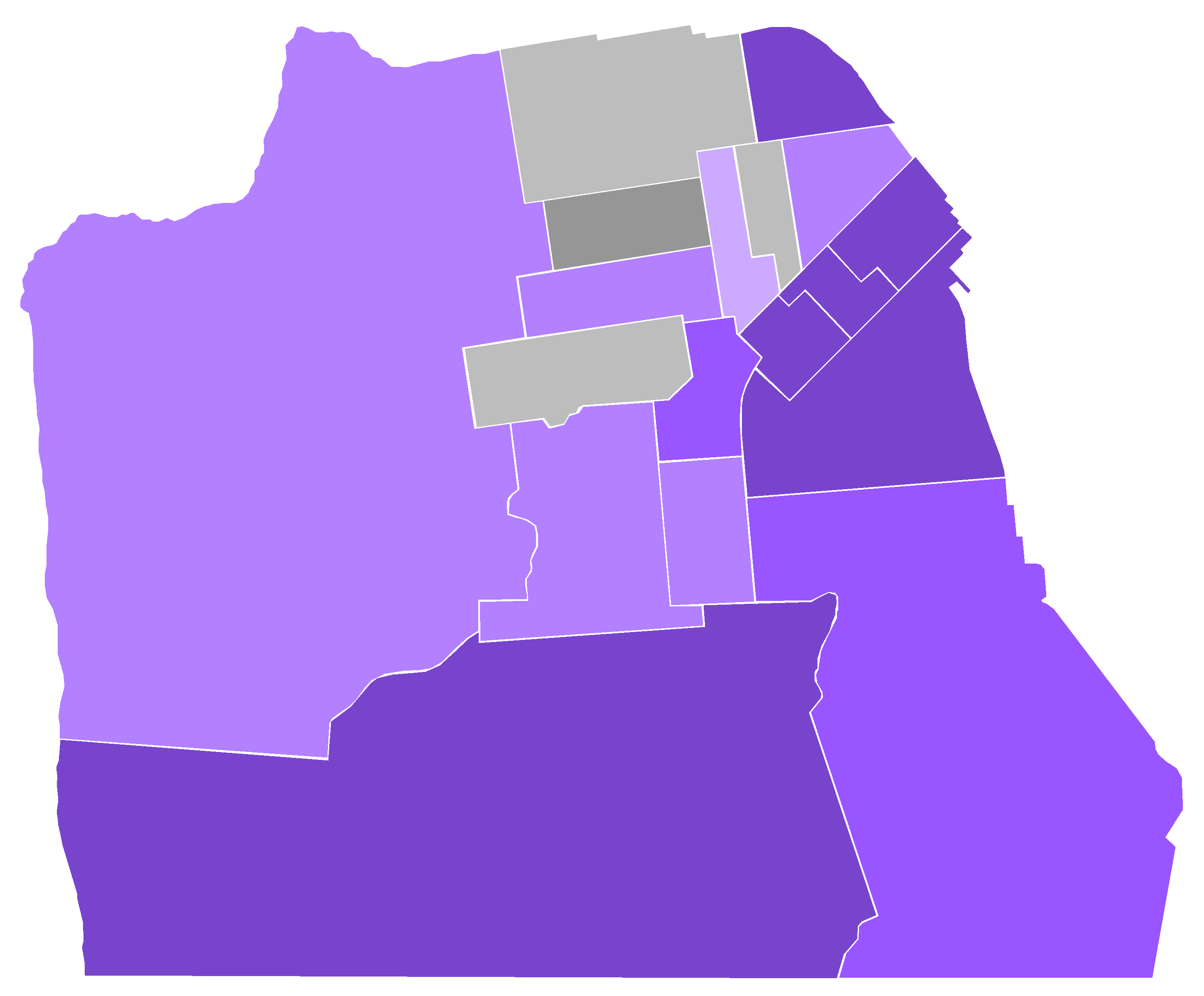
- Results by State Assembly district Schmitz: 40–50% 50–60% 60–70% 70–80% Partridge: 50–60% 60–70%
Mayor before election
Eugene E. Schmitz
Union Labor
Elected Mayor
Eugene E. Schmitz
Union Labor

The 1905 San Francisco mayoral election was held on November 7, 1905. Incumbent Eugene E. Schmitz was reelected with 56% of the vote.

== Results ==
1905 San Francisco mayoral election
Party	Candidate	Votes	%
Union Labor	Eugene E. Schmitz	40,191	56.58%
Fusion	John S. Partridge	28,687	40.39%
Socialist	A. W. Castner	1,686	2.37%
Total votes		71,033	100.00
Union Labor hold			

== Newspaper gallery ==
The San Francisco Call

San Francisco Chronicle

San Francisco Examiner
