= 1903 San Francisco mayoral election =

- November 3, 1903
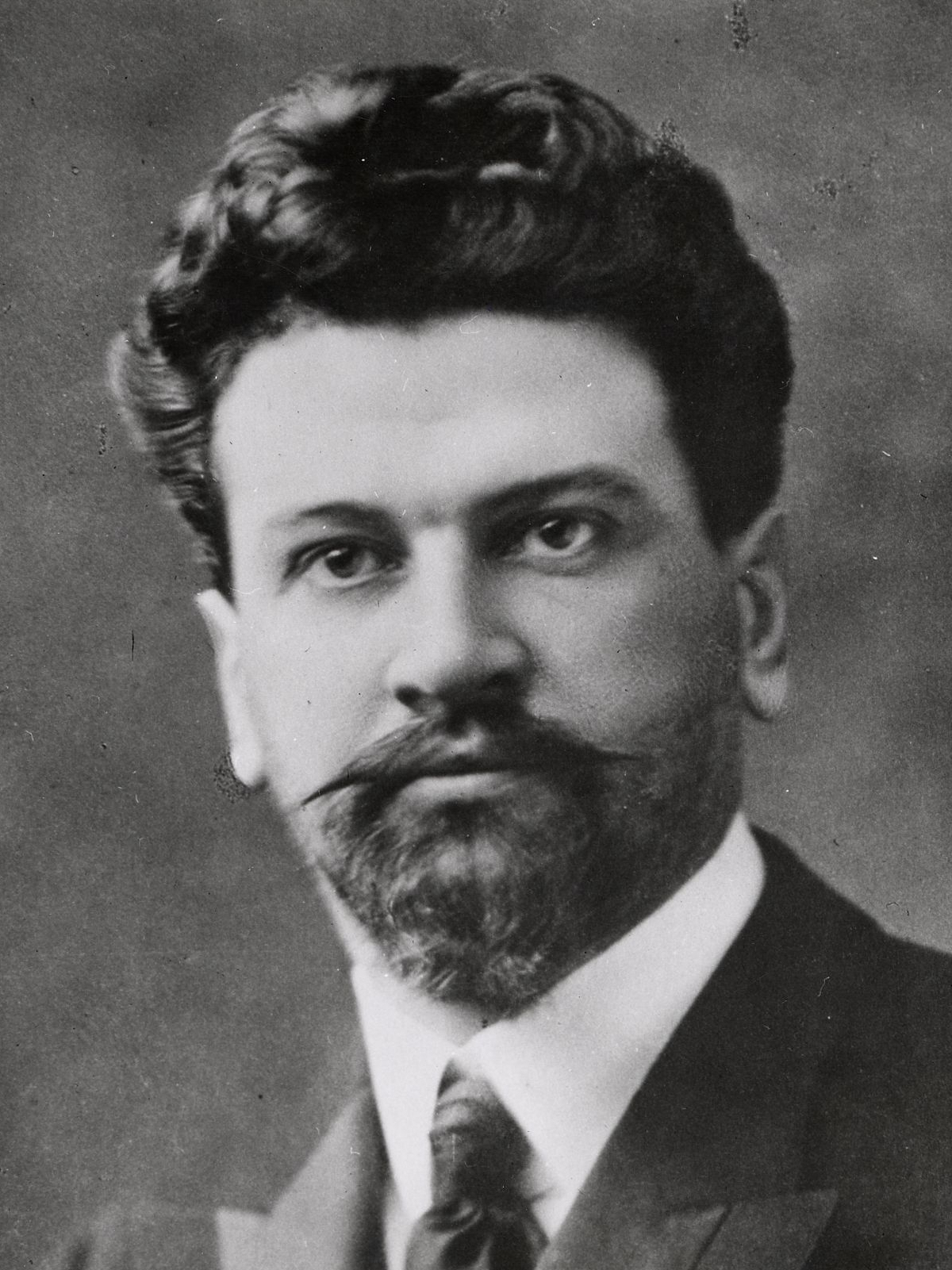

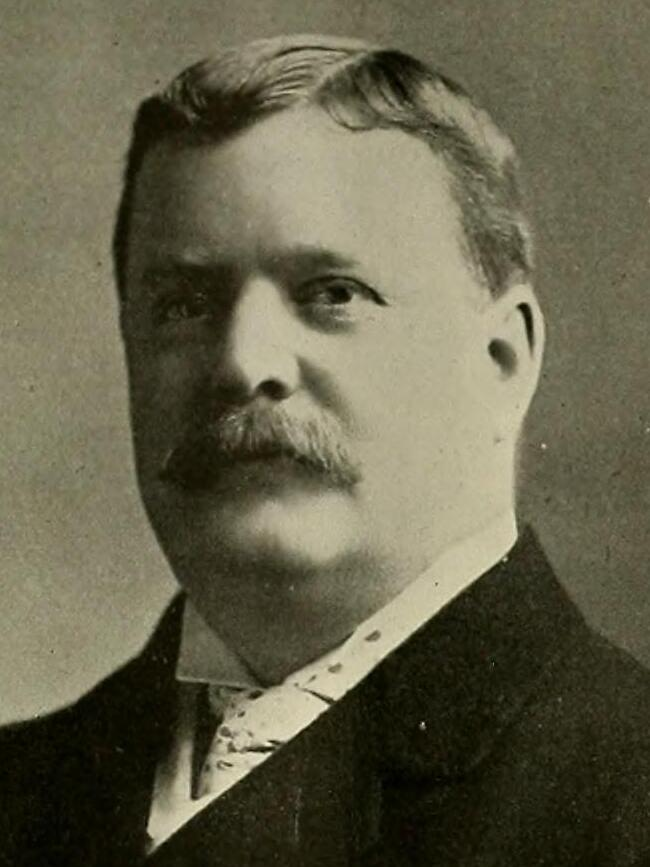

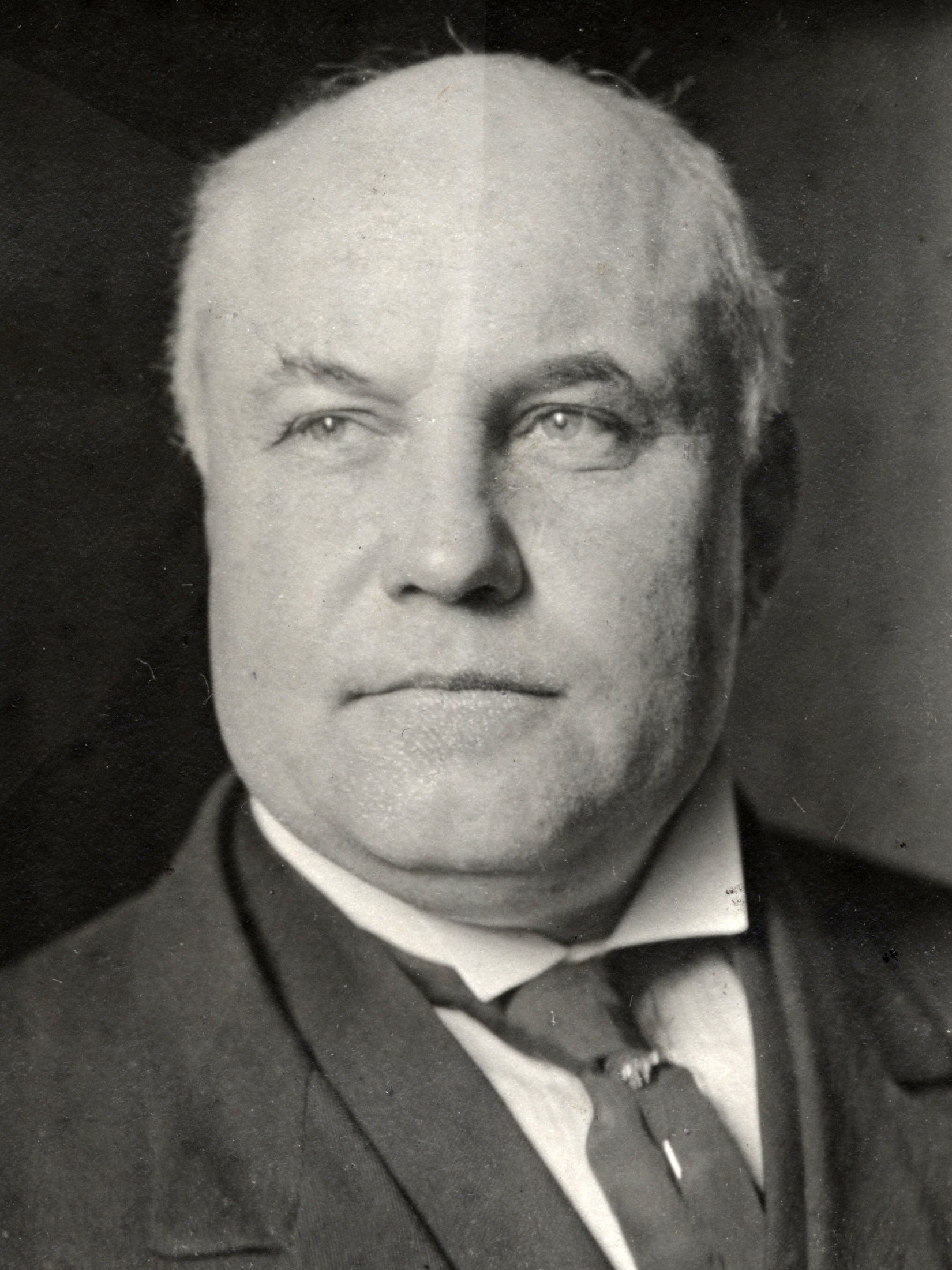
Candidate	Eugene E. Schmitz	Henry J. Crocker	Franklin K. Lane
Party	Union Labor	Republican	Democratic
Popular vote	26,016	19,621	12,578
Percentage	43.87%	33.08%	21.21%
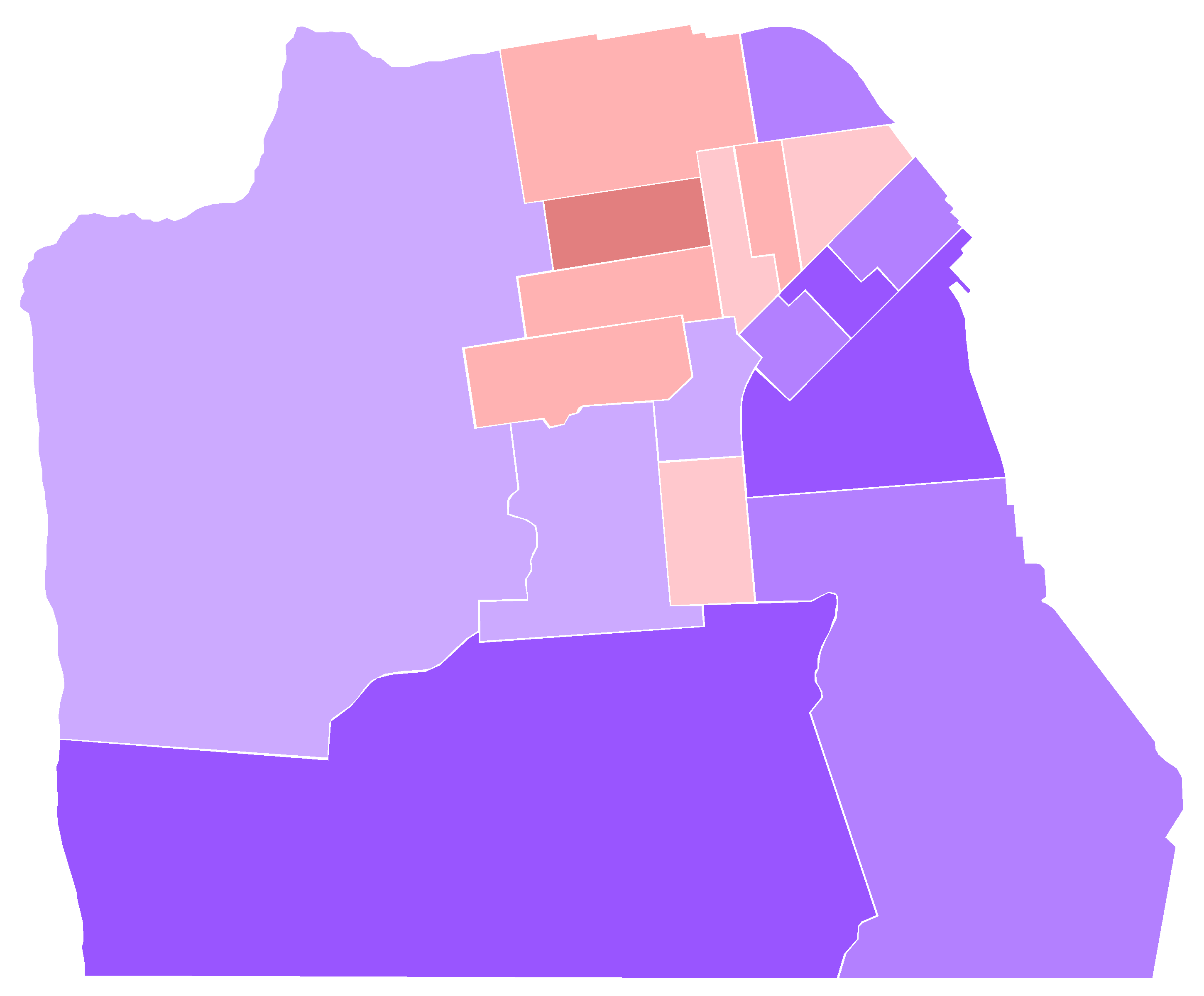
- Results by State Assembly district Schmitz: 40–50% 50–60% 60–70% Crocker: 30–40% 40–50% 50–60%
Mayor before election
Eugene E. Schmitz
Union Labor
Elected Mayor
Eugene E. Schmitz
Union Labor

The 1903 San Francisco mayoral election was held on November 3, 1903. Incumbent Eugene E. Schmitz was reelected with 43% of the vote.

== Results ==
1903 San Francisco mayoral election
Party	Candidate	Votes	%
Union Labor	Eugene E. Schmitz	26,016	43.87%
Republican	Henry J. Crocker	19,621	33.08%
Democratic	Franklin K. Lane	12,578	21.21%
Socialist	Frank R. Whitney	1,094	1.84%
Total votes		59,309	100.00
Union Labor hold			
