= 1901 San Francisco mayoral election =

- November 5, 1901
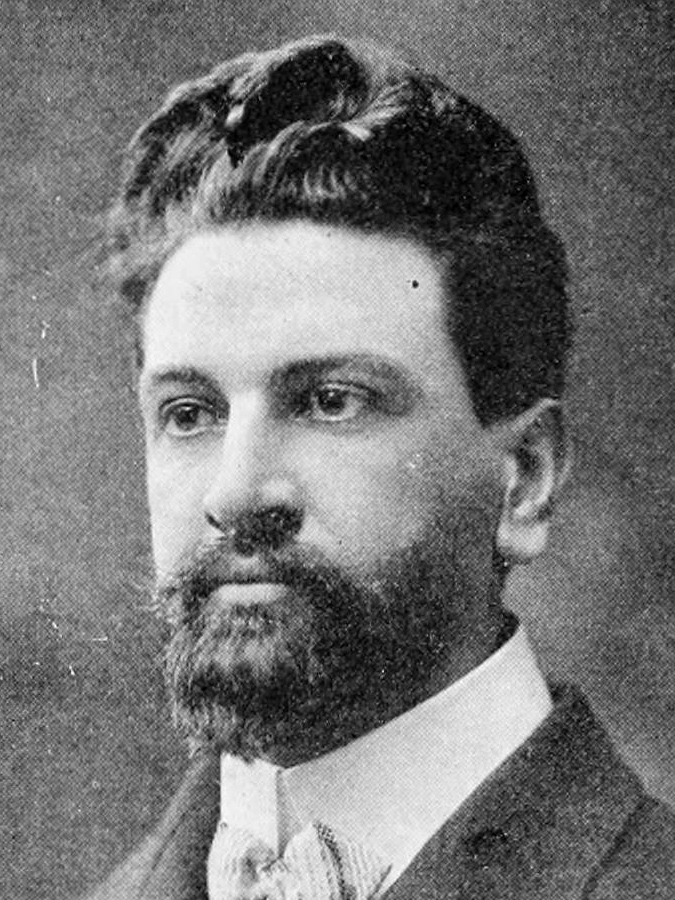

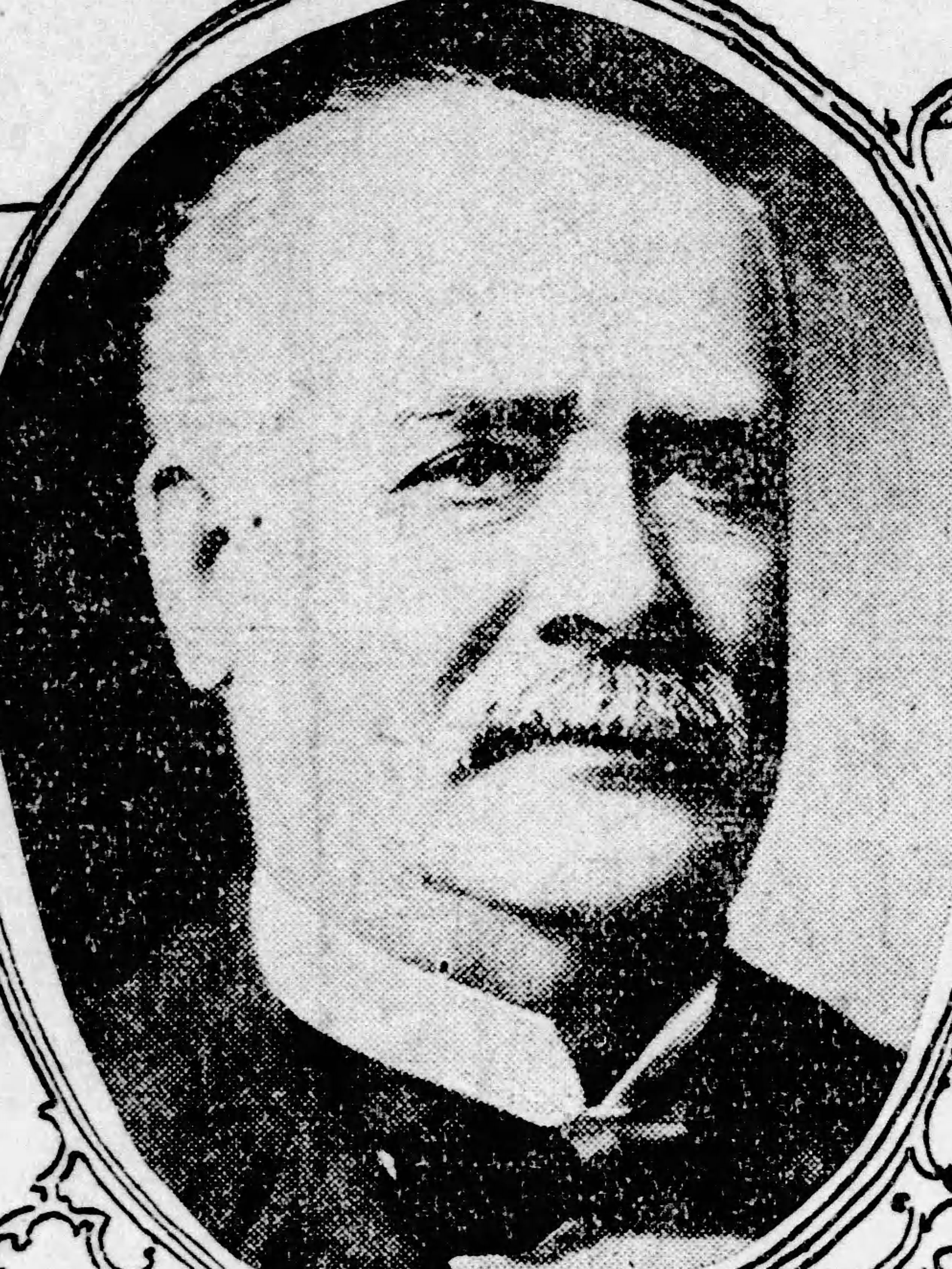

Candidate	Eugene E. Schmitz	Asa R. Wells	Joseph S. Tobin
Party	Union Labor	Republican	Democratic
Popular vote	21,776	17,718	12,647
Percentage	40.71%	33.12%	23.64%
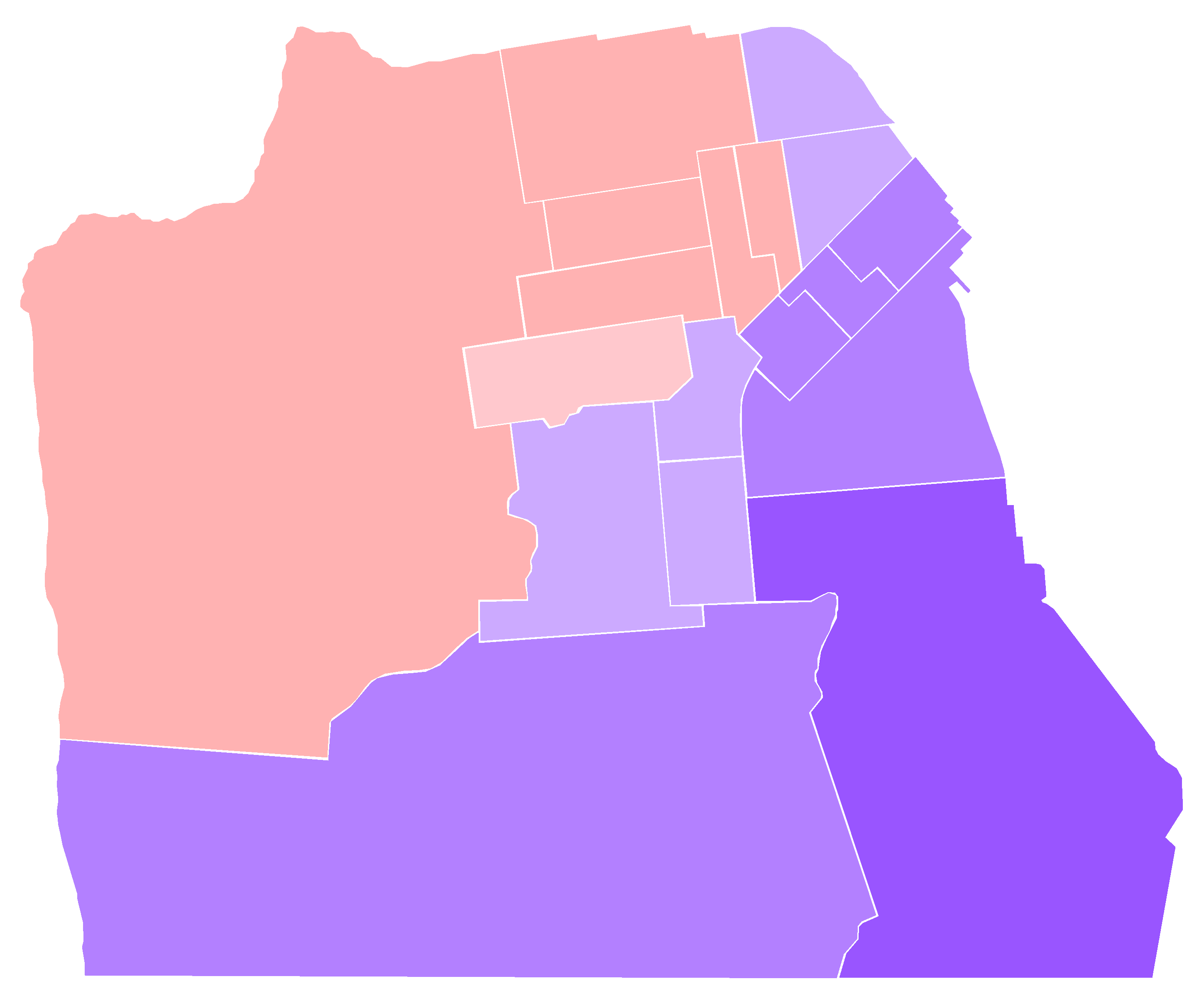
- Results by State Assembly district Schmitz: 40–50% 50–60% 60–70% Wells: 30–40% 40–50%
Mayor before election
James D. Phelan
Democratic
Elected Mayor
Eugene E. Schmitz
Union Labor

The 1901 San Francisco mayoral election was held on November 5, 1901. Eugene E. Schmitz was elected with 40% of the vote.

== Results ==
1901 San Francisco mayoral election
Party	Candidate	Votes	%
Union Labor	Eugene E. Schmitz	21,776	40.71%
Republican	Asa R. Wells	17,718	33.12%
Democratic	Joseph S. Tobin	12,647	23.64%
Socialist	C. L. Ames	912	1.70%
Independent	Charles C. O'Donnell	57	0.11%
Total votes		53,493	100.00
Union Labor gain from Democratic			
