= 1955 San Francisco mayoral election =

- November 8, 1955
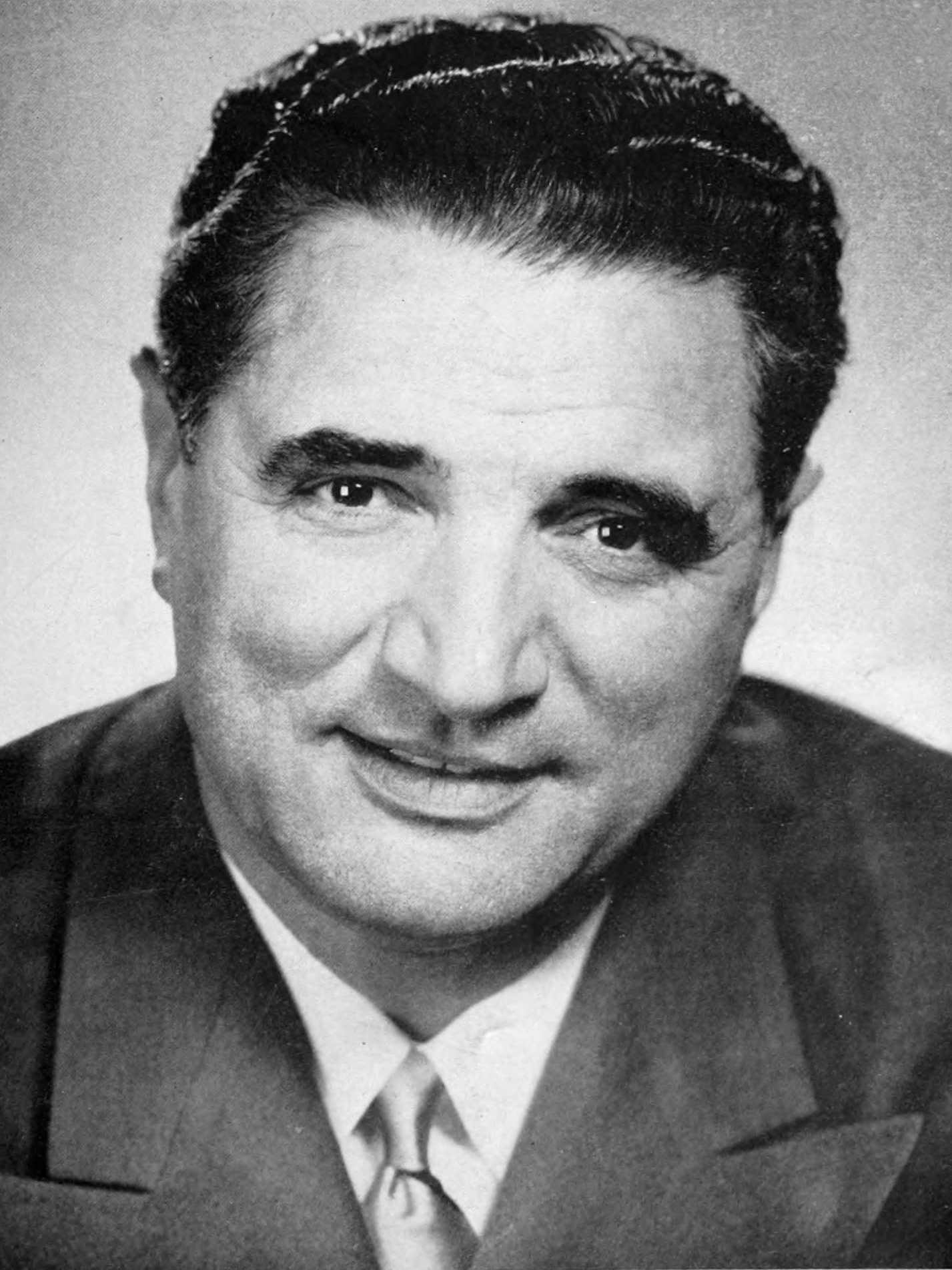

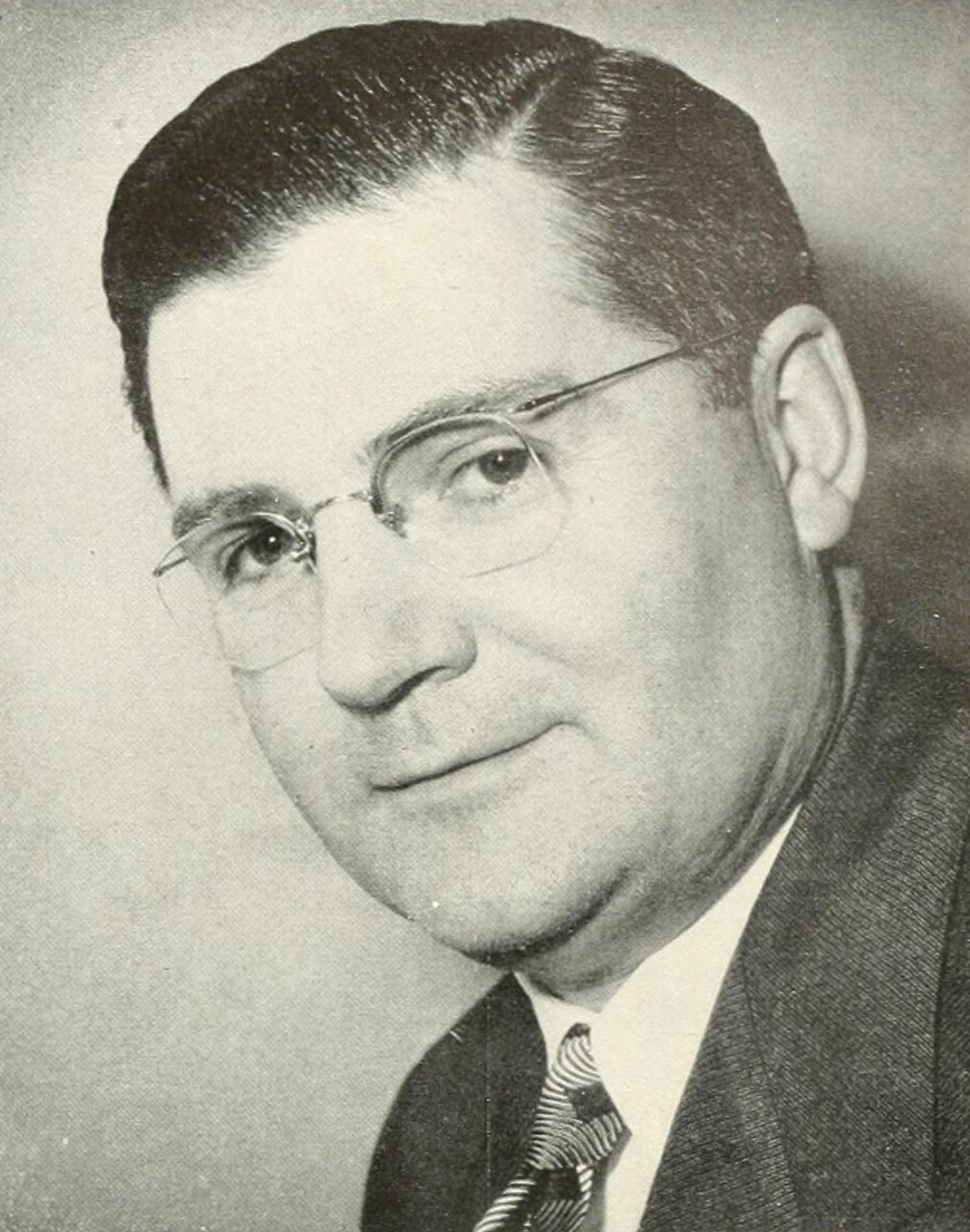
Candidate	George Christopher	George R. Reilly
Party	Republican	Democratic
Popular vote	162,280	77,085
Percentage	66.42%	31.55%
Mayor before election
Elmer Robinson
Republican
Elected mayor
George Christopher
Republican

The 1955 San Francisco mayoral election was held on November 8, 1955. George Christopher was elected with 66% of the vote.

== Results ==
1955 San Francisco mayoral election
Candidate	Votes	%
George Christopher	162,280	66.42%
George R. Reilly	77,085	31.55%
Marie Antoinette LePleux	1,182	0.48%
Donald J. Bruce	1,135	0.47%
Earl David "Maxie" Brown	979	0.40%
Frank A. Barbaria	950	0.39%
Roderick Brian O'Donnell	698	0.29%
