= George Christopher (mayor) =

34th Mayor of San Francisco from 1956 to 1964

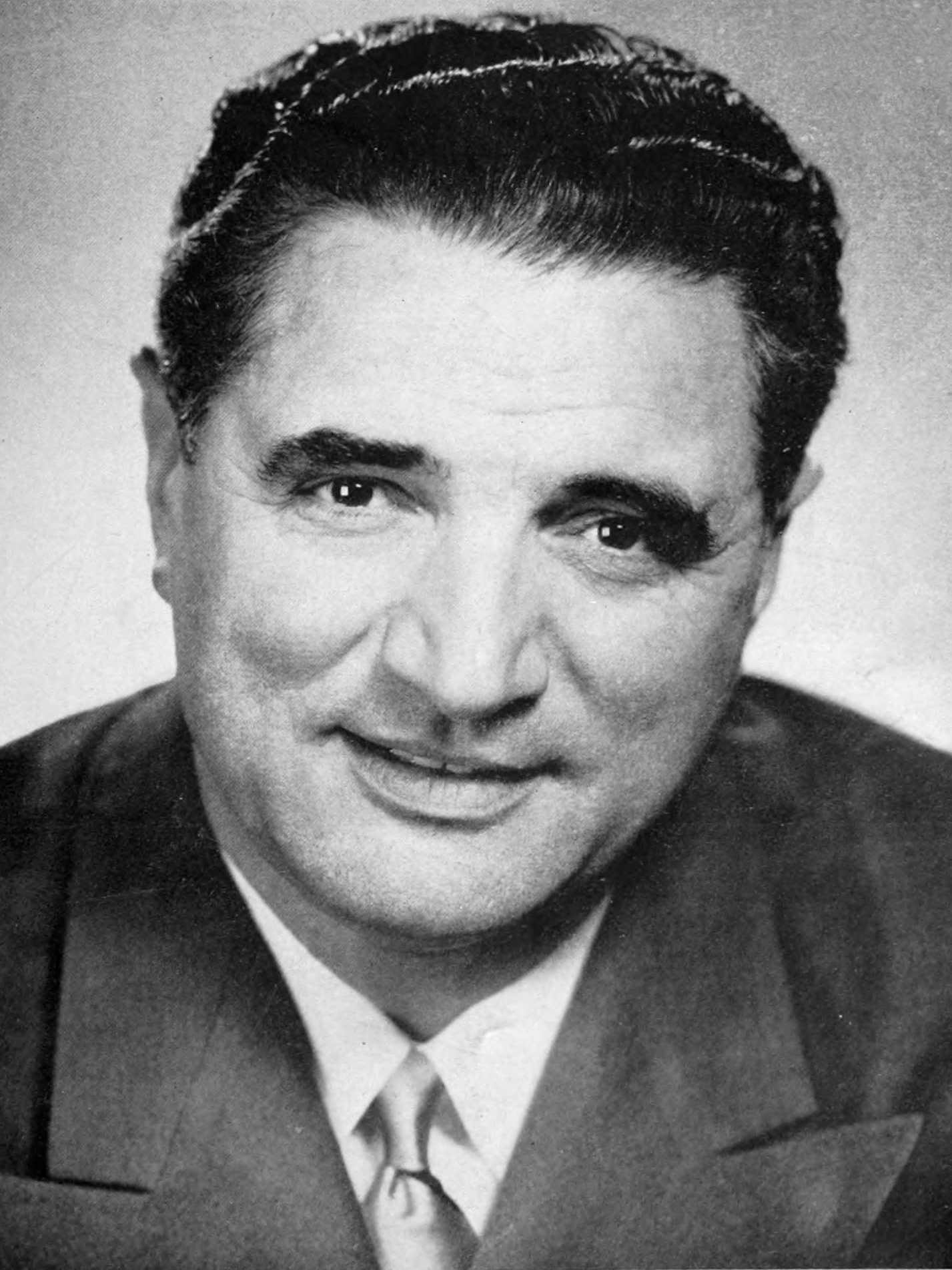
- Christopher c. 1955

34th Mayor of San Francisco
- In office January 8, 1956 – January 8, 1964
- Preceded by: Elmer Robinson
- Succeeded by: John F. Shelley

30th President of the National League of Cities
- In office 1958
- Preceded by: Ben West
- Succeeded by: Anthony J. Celebrezze

President of the San Francisco Board of Supervisors
- In office 1950–1956

Member of the San Francisco Board of Supervisors
- In office 1946–1956
- Preceded by: Adolph Uhl
- Succeeded by: Henry Rolph

Personal details
- Born: Georgios Christopheles; December 8, 1907 Agios Petros, Arcadia, Kingdom of Greece
- Died: September 14, 2000 (aged 92) San Francisco, California, U.S.
- Party: Republican
- Spouse: Tula Sarantitis (m. 1935; died 1990)
- Profession: Accountant, businessman

George Christopher (born George Christopheles; December 8, 1907 – September 14, 2000) was a Greek-American politician who served as the 34th mayor of San Francisco from 1956 to 1964. To date, he is the most recent Republican to be elected mayor of San Francisco.

== Early years ==
Born George Christopheles in Arcadia, Greece, the son of James and Mary (née Koines) Christopheles. He and his family emigrated to the United States in 1910 and settled in San Francisco's South of Market neighborhood, then known as "Greektown", when Christopher was two years old. Christopher left school at the age of fourteen when his father James became seriously ill, and he became sole support of his family. He sold newspapers and became a copy boy at the San Francisco Examiner. While working, he also attended night classes at Golden Gate College and earned a bachelor's degree in accounting. After becoming a citizen of the United States in 1930, Christopheles changed his last name to Christopher. In 1935, he married Tula Sarantitis.

== Career ==
After college, Christopher worked for numerous small firms keeping their accounts and eventually bought out a small dairy on Fillmore Street, which became the Christopher Dairy. Berkeley Farms bought the business in 1970.

=== San Francisco City Government ===
Regarded as a moderate Republican, Christopher began his political career in 1945 when he was elected to the San Francisco Board of Supervisors; on re-election, he became board president. Christopher ran for mayor in 1951 and lost by fewer than 3,000 votes to incumbent mayor Elmer Robinson. In November 1955, Christopher again sought the post of mayor. He won in a landslide over Democrat George Reilly. During his administration, San Francisco hosted the 1956 Republican National Convention at the Cow Palace, in which the party renominated incumbent president Dwight D. Eisenhower as its candidate in the upcoming presidential election. Christopher was re-elected in 1959 for a second term. Christopher was instrumental in bringing the New York Giants baseball team to San Francisco in 1958 (where they became the San Francisco Giants) and securing the funding to build Candlestick Park on the abandoned lands of Sunset Scavenger on Candlestick Point with the ballpark opening for the Giants’ 1960 season. His administration has been credited with the building of the Brooks Hall, 12 new schools, 17 firehouses, six public swimming pools, the five-story Fifth and Mission and the underground Civic Center garages. Christopher was known for his strong stand on civil rights. He gained worldwide headlines offering his home to Willie Mays after it was reported that a Forest Hill realtor had refused to sell to Mays. Christopher also lobbied and succeeded in opening mental health and alcohol treatment centers under city funding.

In 1958, Christopher served as the president of the National League of Cities.

Christopher presided over the redevelopment of major portions of city and private lands, labeled slums, some not without controversy, such as the Embarcadero Center and Golden Gateway; displacing the old wholesale produce market from the filled land southeast of Telegraph Hill to the Alemany location where it remains; Japantown and the Fillmore urban renewal that displaced the African-American community and the remnants of the Jewish community for concrete high-rises; the new Hall of Justice; and the opening of the Embarcadero Freeway, which blocked the Embarcadero and Ferry Building from the city, spawning the first Freeway Revolt. In Christopher's second term, the House Subcommittee on Un-American Activities held hearings in the City Hall supervisor's chambers. A large group of students and active citizens were fire-hosed down the marble steps inside City Hall rotunda by the San Francisco Police Department when they protested their exclusion from admission to committee hearings. Christopher later told the Federal Government they were no longer welcome in city buildings, but he sided with the committee and spoke for the propaganda newsreel-style film made by the committee about the event, titled Operation Abolition, that blamed Communists for the so-called City Hall riot of May 13, 1960. Christopher was criticized for endorsing the film while saying that "at least 90% of the students were not organized by the Communists."

=== Other elections ===
Christopher's various bids for higher office failed. In 1958, Christopher was defeated in the Republican primary for U.S. Senate by Governor Goodwin Knight. In 1962, when Richard Nixon ran for governor, Christopher ran for lieutenant governor, losing to incumbent Democrat Glenn M. Anderson. In 1966, he lost the Republican primary for Governor of California to motion picture and television actor (and future conservative icon and President) Ronald Reagan, who won with 77 percent of the vote. Historian Geoffrey Kabaservice points out that a Drew Pearson column that highlighted a 1940 arrest of Christopher for buying and selling underpriced milk, a story fed to Pearson by the staff of incumbent governor Pat Brown, and Christopher's underwhelming response to that column contributed to the loss.
