= Japantown =

Common name for Japanese enclaves in cities and towns outside of Japan

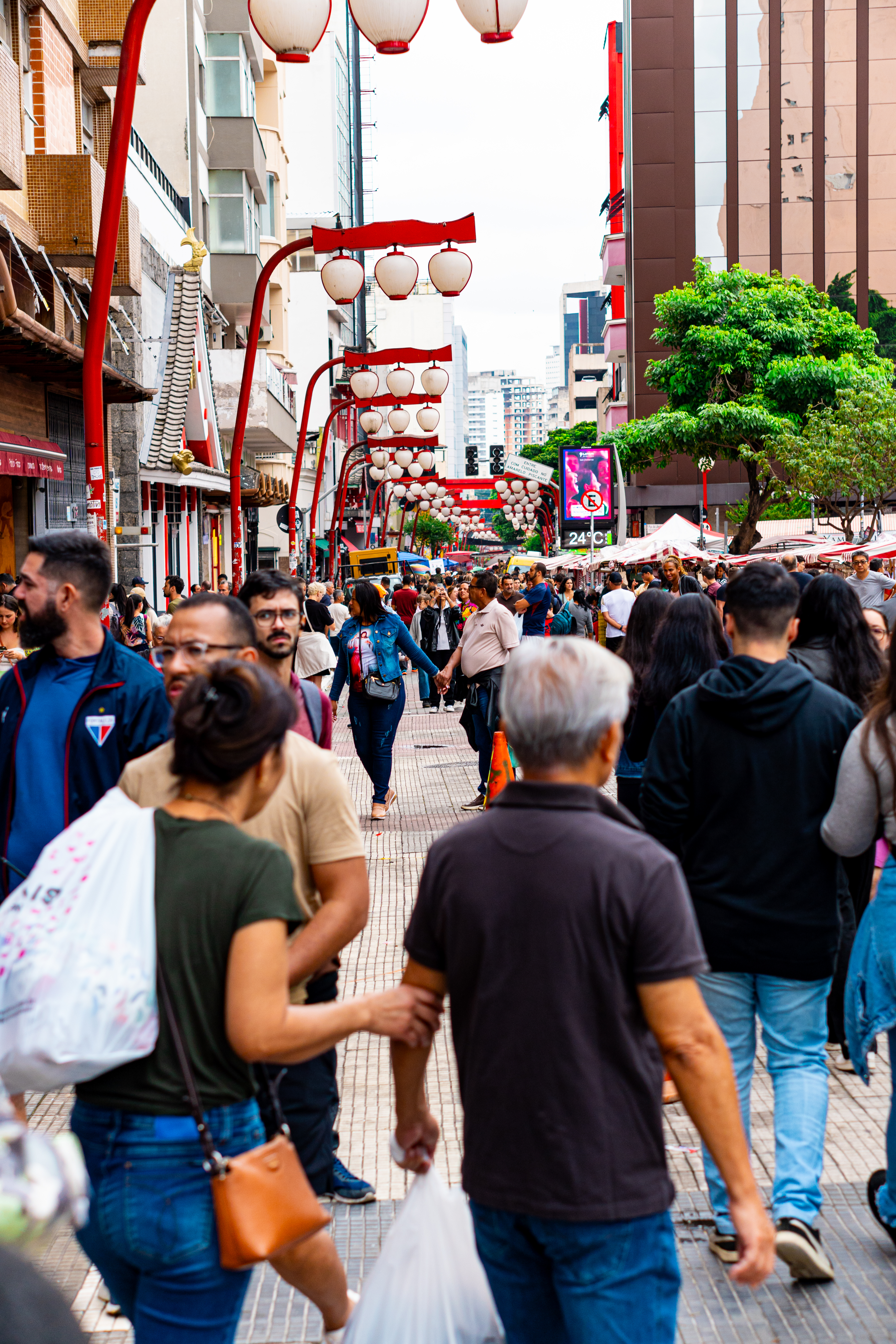
- Liberdade in São Paulo, Brazil

Japanese name
- Kanji: 日本人街
- Kana: にほんじんがい
Transcriptions
- Romanization: Nihonjin-gai
- Kunrei-shiki: Nihonzin-gai

Japantown (日本人街) is a common name for Japanese communities in cities and towns outside Japan. Alternatively, a Japantown may be called J-town, Little Tokyo or Nihonmachi (日本町), the first two being common names for Japantown, San Francisco, Japantown, San Jose and Little Tokyo, Los Angeles.

== Etymology ==
The name "Japantown" was modeled after the older, well-established term "Chinatown", which dates back to 1606. The first recorded instances of the name “Japantown” emerged in the United States during the early 1900s. An early example of the term being used appears in a 1912 article titled The Japanese in America by Japanese chemist Jokichi Takamine, published in Volume 2 of the Journal of Race Development, a journal dedicated to the promotion of eugenics. In the article, Takamine commended the Japanese community in New York City for what he described as their “remarkable assimilation of American manners and customs,” contrasting this with his negative portrayal of Chinese immigrants. He stated, "There is in no Occidental city a Japantown as there is a Chinatown. Though there are two thousand Japanese in New York, they are scattered all over the city, and so thoroughly merged in the population that they never form an element apart. The allegation that the Japanese are unassimilable is a totally mistaken one."

== History ==
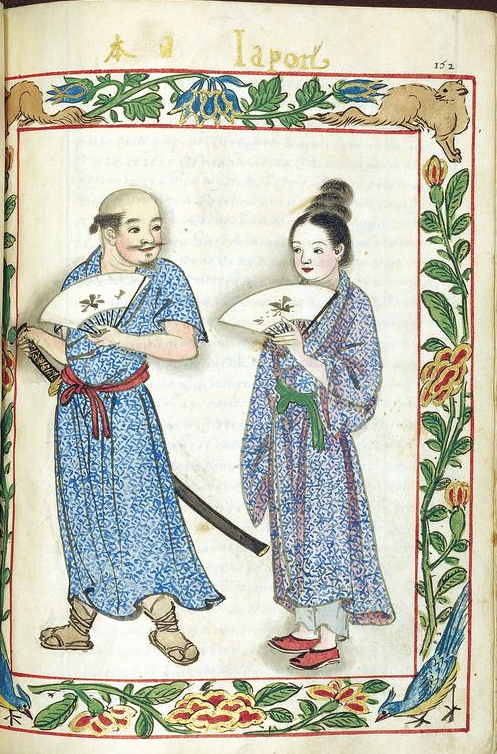
Japanese people living in the Philippines as portrayed in the Boxer codex (1590)

Historically, Japantowns represented the Japanese diaspora and its individual members known as nikkei (日系), who are Japanese emigrants from Japan and their descendants that reside in a foreign country. Emigration from Japan first happened and was recorded as early as the 12th century to the Philippines, but did not become a mass phenomenon until the Meiji Era, when Japanese began to go to the Philippines, North America, and beginning in 1897 with 35 emigrants to Mexico; and later to Peru, beginning in 1899 with 790 emigrants. There was also significant emigration to the territories of the Empire of Japan during the colonial period; however, most such emigrants repatriated to Japan after the end of World War II in Asia.

For a brief period in the 16th–17th centuries, Japanese overseas activity and presence in Southeast Asia and elsewhere in the region boomed. Sizeable Japanese communities, known as Nihonmachi, could be found in many of the major ports and political centers of the region, where they exerted significant political and economic influence.

The Japanese had been active on the seas and across the region for centuries, traveling for commercial, political, religious and other reasons. The 16th century, however, saw a dramatic increase in such travel and activity. The internal strife of the Sengoku period caused a great many people, primarily samurai, commoner merchants, and Christian refugees to seek their fortunes across the seas. Many of the samurai who fled Japan around this time were those who stood on the losing sides of various major conflicts; some were rōnin, some veterans of the Japanese invasions of Korea or of various other major conflicts. As Toyotomi Hideyoshi and later the Tokugawa shōguns issued repeated bans on Christianity, many fled the country; a significant portion of those settled in Catholic Manila.

In western countries such as Canada and the United States, the Japanese tended to integrate with society so that many if not all Japantowns are in danger of completely disappearing, with the remaining only existing in San Francisco, San Jose, and Los Angeles, California.

== Characteristics ==
The features described below are characteristic of many modern Japantowns.

=== Japanese architectural styles ===
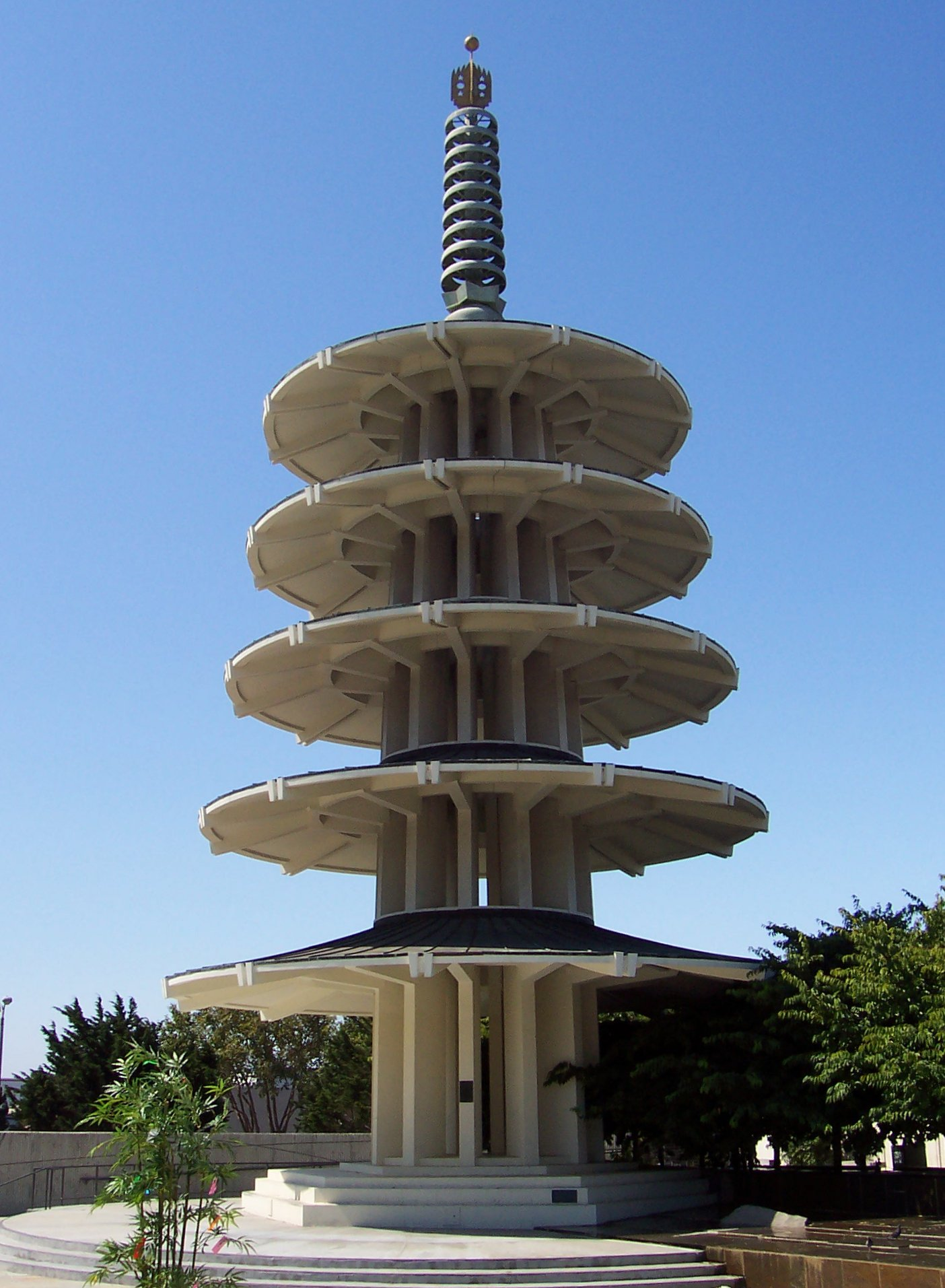
The five-tiered Peace Pagoda made of concrete in San Francisco

Many historical Japantowns will exhibit architectural styles that reflect the Japanese culture. Japanese architecture has traditionally been typified by wooden structures, elevated slightly off the ground, with tiled or thatched roofs. Sliding doors (fusuma) were used in place of walls, allowing the internal configuration of a space to be customized for different occasions. People usually sat on cushions or otherwise on the floor, traditionally; chairs and high tables were not widely used until the 20th century. Since the 19th century, however, Japan has incorporated much of Western, modern, and post-modern architecture into construction and design.

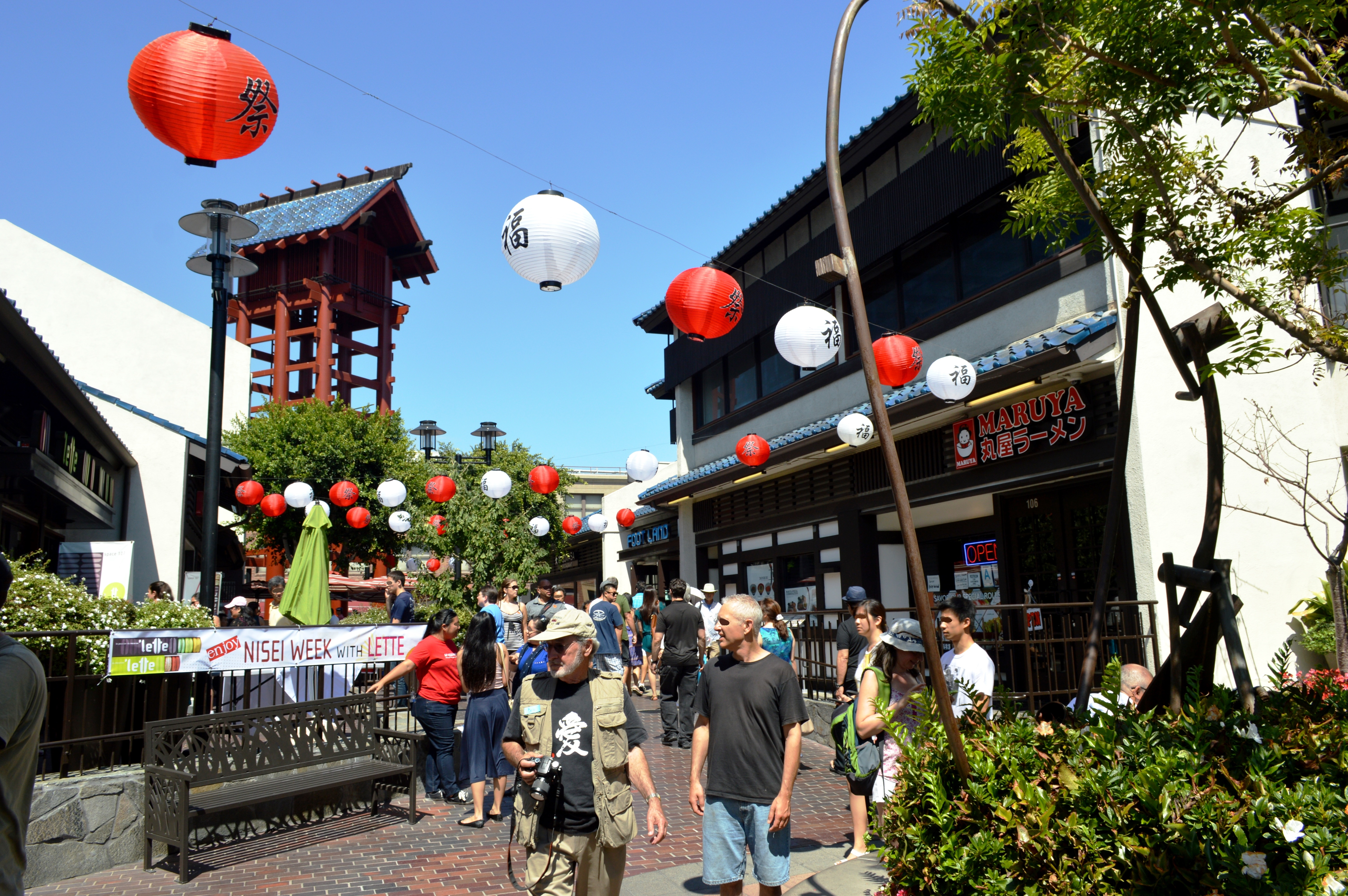
The Japanese Village Plaza in Los Angeles' Little Tokyo

=== Japanese language ===
Many Japantowns will exhibit the use of the Japanese language in signage existing on road signs and on buildings as Japanese which is the official and primary language of Japan. Japanese has a lexically distinct pitch-accent system. Early Japanese is known largely on the basis of its state in the 8th century, when the three major works of Old Japanese were compiled. The earliest attestation of the Japanese language is in a Chinese document from 252 AD.

Japanese is written with a combination of three scripts: hiragana, derived from the Chinese cursive script, katakana, derived as a shorthand from Chinese characters, and kanji, imported from China. The Latin alphabet, rōmaji, is also often used in modern Japanese, especially for company names and logos, advertising, and when inputting Japanese into a computer. The Hindu–Arabic numerals are generally used for numbers, but traditional Sino–Japanese numerals are also common.

== Locations ==
Japanese diaspora 日系人
Total population
- About 3,600,000

Regions with significant populations
- Brazil: 1,600,000
- United States: 1,404,286
- China: 127,282^{note}
- Philippines: 120,000
- Canada: 109,740
- Peru: 103,949
- Thailand: 78,431 (2022, Japanese nationality only^{note})
- Australia: 72,000
- Germany: 70,000
- Argentina: 65,000
- United Kingdom: 63,011
- South Korea: 58,169^{note}
- Mexico: 35,000
- France: 30,947^{note}
- Singapore: 27,525^{note}
- Hong Kong: 27,429
- Vietnam: 17,266 (2017, Japanese nationality only^{note})
- Malaysia: 22,000^{note}
- Micronesia: 20,000
- Indonesia: 14,720^{note}
- New Zealand: 14,118
- Bolivia: 14,000
- Netherlands: 10,460
- Spain: 8,720
- India: 8,398
- New Caledonia: 8,000
- Italy: 7,556^{note}
- Paraguay: 7,000
- Belgium: 6,519
- Marshall Islands: 6,000
- Sweden: 5,235
- Palau: 5,000
- Macau: 4,200
- Switzerland: 4,071^{note}
- Austria: 3,500
- Uruguay: 3,456^{note}
- Cambodia: 3,363 (2022, Japanese nationality only^{note})
- Ireland: 3,122
- Colombia: 3,000^{note}
- Chile: 2,600
- Russia: 1,321^{note}
- Qatar: 1,000

Related ethnic groups
- Ryukyuan diaspora
- note: The population of naturalized Japanese people and their descendants is unknown. Only the number of the permanent residents with Japanese nationality is shown, except for the United States, where ancestral origin is recorded independent of nationality.

=== Americas ===
Japantowns were created because of the widespread immigration of Japanese to America in the Meiji period (1868–1912). At that time, many Japanese were poor and sought economic opportunities in the United States. Japanese immigrants initially settled in Western parts of the US and Canada.

At one time, there were 43 different Japantowns in California, ranging from several square blocks of Little Tokyo in Los Angeles, to one in the small farming community of Marysville in Yuba County. Besides typical businesses, these communities usually had Japanese language schools for the immigrants' children, Japanese language newspapers, Buddhist and Christian churches, and sometimes Japanese hospitals. After the World War II internment of the Japanese, most of those communities declined significantly or disappeared altogether.

There are currently three recognized Japantowns left in the United States, which are facing issues such as commercialization, reconstruction, gentrification and dwindling Japanese populations.

==== Argentina ====
- Colonia Urquiza is the Japanese district in La Plata, Argentina. Colonia Urquiza is the largest Japanese district in Argentina, and concentrates many institutions such as schools, restaurants and training centers.

==== Brazil ====
- Liberdade is the Japanese district in São Paulo, Brazil. São Paulo metropolitan area is the city that has the largest Japanese population outside Japan and the largest population of Brazilians that have Japanese descent.

==== Canada ====
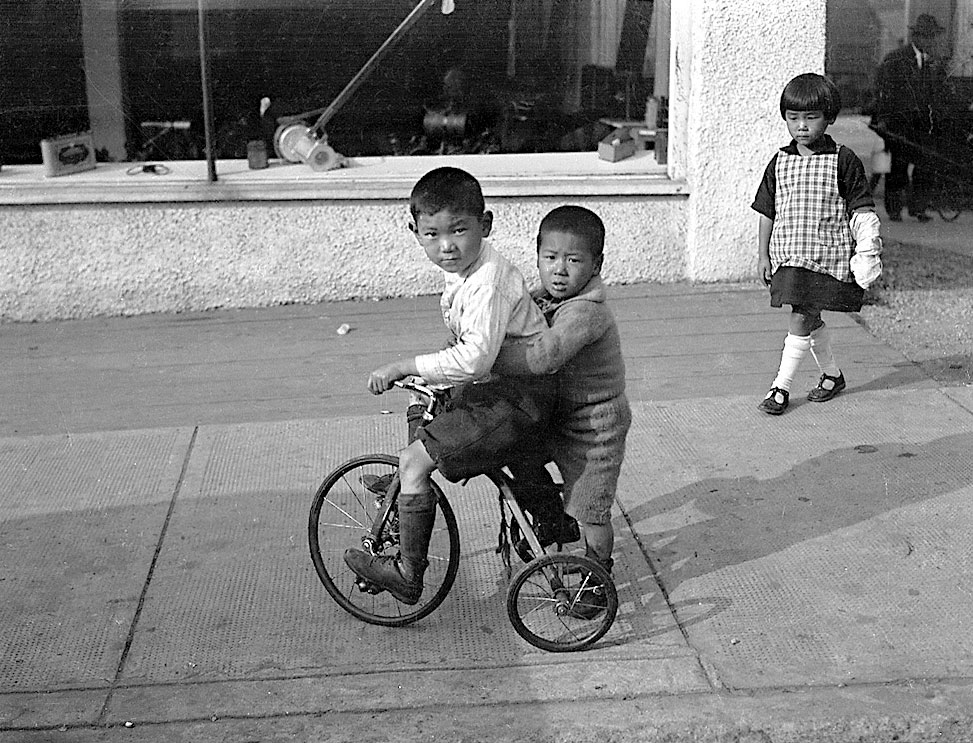
Kids at play in 1927 in Japantown, Vancouver

Several Japantowns emerged in the British Columbia's Lower Mainland during the early 20th century, including Japantown, Vancouver. Steveston in Richmond, British Columbia was another community whose population in 1942 was primarily made up of people of Japanese descent. However, these communities were dispersed after Japanese Canadians were interned during World War II.

In the early 21st century, a Little Japan has emerged around Bay and Dundas Street in Toronto.

Canadian municipalities with Japanese populations higher than the national average (0.3%) include:

- Richmond, British Columbia (2%)
- Lethbridge, Alberta (1.9%)
- Burnaby, British Columbia (1.7%)
- Vancouver, British Columbia (1.7%)
- North Vancouver, British Columbia (1.6%)
- North Vancouver (district municipality), British Columbia (1.5%)
- Port Coquitlam, British Columbia (1.4%)
- West Vancouver, British Columbia (1.2%)
- Coquitlam, British Columbia (1%)
- Kamloops, British Columbia (1%)
- Port Moody, British Columbia (1%)
- Calgary, Alberta (0.6%) – 29 Street SW
- Richmond Hill, Ontario (0.5%)
- Toronto, Ontario (0.5%)
- Markham, Ontario (0.4%)

==== Mexico ====
- Little Tokyo, Cuauhtémoc, Mexico City this neighborhood in the Cuauhtémoc district is home to many Japanese establishments from restaurants, ramen houses, Japanese bars, Japanese book stores, Japanese hotels and many other businesses catering to the Japanese community in the city as well as to the locals and tourists. Future plans for the neighborhood include a welcoming torii and Japanese style lanterns along the streets on Little Tokyo as designation markers of the "Barrio Japonés" and many other cultural markers.
- Aguilas, Mexico City neighborhood in Mexico City. This part of the city is home to many Mexicans of Japanese origin.. Japanese clubs and restaurants as well as the Japanese gardens. This area was mainly settled by many Japanese during WWII as the Mexican government concentrated many Japanese nationals in this area. Today it is a thriving part of the city with many Japanese institutions for the Nikkei community.
- Acacoyagua, Chiapas. Acacoyagua is to this day the oldest Japanese colony in Latin America. It is a colony from the late 1800s where Japan sent off citizens to populate other parts of the world because of overpopulation at the time. The Enomoto Colony tried to farm coffee seeing the success of the neighboring German colonies in the Soconusco region. The colony prospered and to this day maintains their Japanese identity in the region. A Torii has been erected to welcome visitors as many institutions and buildings have Japanese cultural markers, especially in the Central Park. The descendants are very proud of their culture and have very strong ties to Japan, including welcoming the Crown Prince of Japan And Japanese festivals.

==== Peru ====
- Neighborhood around the Peruvian Japanese Cultural Center in Jesús María District, Lima

==== United States ====
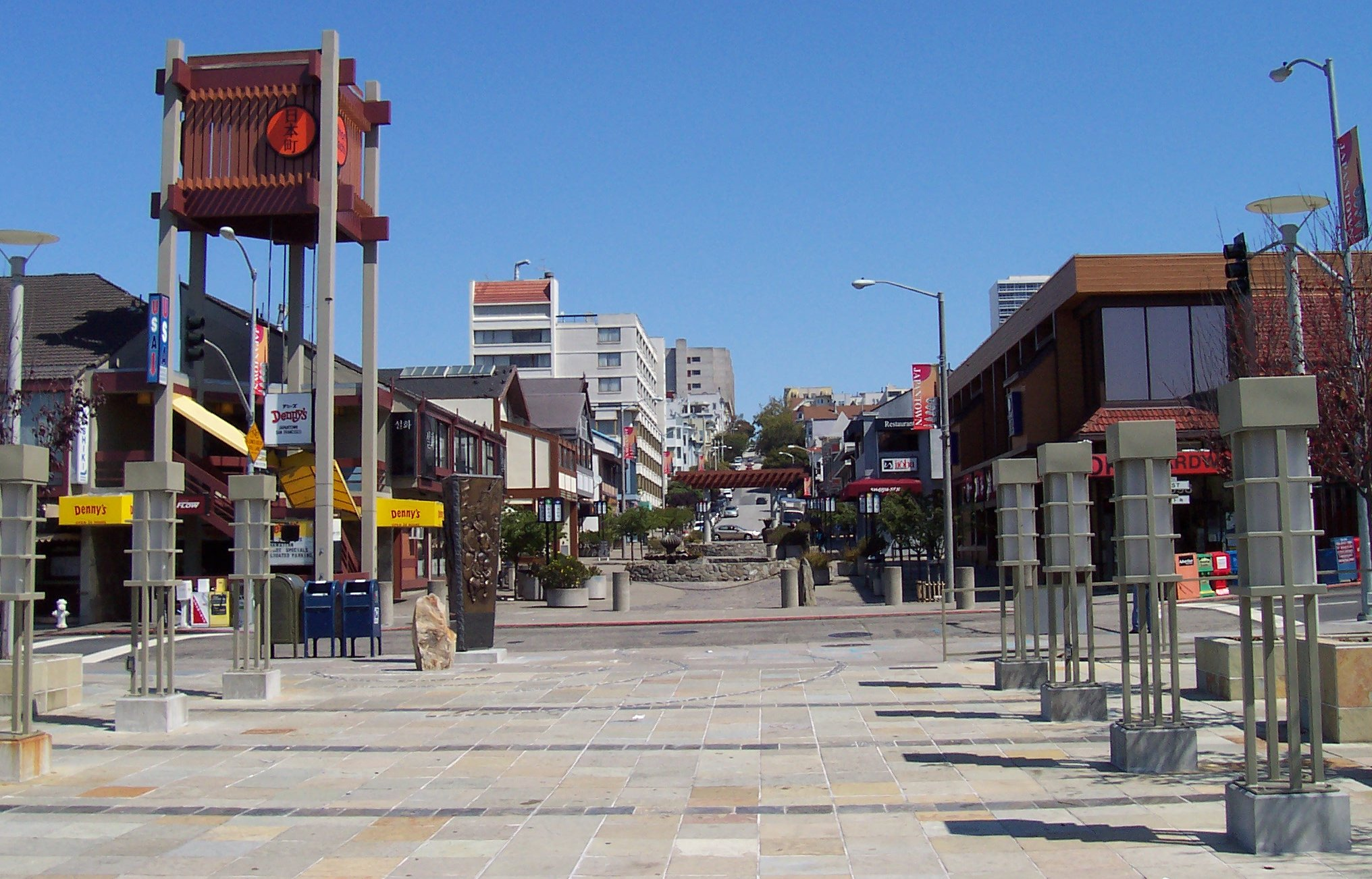
Looking across Post Street north on Buchanan Street in San Francisco's Japantown

Prior to World War II, there were countless Japantowns across the country with over 40 in California alone. The mass evacuation and incarceration of Japanese Americans in the wake of Executive Order 9066 resulted in the loss of tens of thousands of Japanese American properties and businesses, effectively erasing many of the historic Japantowns across the country as their old neighborhoods were quickly occupied by new families who had moved in during their absence and were further obliterated in urban renewal projects of the 1950s and 60s.

Even the surviving Japantowns are a shadow of their former selves as later generations scattered and dispersed across the country as pre-war housing covenants began to be lifted in the 1960s, and now cater more to tourists and the greater Asian Pacific communities.

Designated Japantown areas remain in the following areas:

- Little Tokyo, Los Angeles, California
- Sawtelle Japantown, Los Angeles, California
- Japantown, San Francisco, California
- Japantown, San Jose California
- Chinatown–International District, Seattle, Washington

===== Communities over 10% Japanese in the United States =====
Los Angeles County

- Gardena, California
- Torrance, California – Along with neighboring Gardena called "Japan's 47th prefecture"

Hawaii

- Honolulu, Hawaii
- Aiea, Hawaii
- Pearl City, Hawaii
- Waimalu, Hawaii
- Hilo, Hawaii
- Mililani Town, Hawaii
- Kaneohe, Hawaii
- Waipio, Hawaii
- Wailuku, Hawaii
- Wahiawa, Hawaii
- Halawa, Hawaii
- Waipahu, Hawaii
- Kapaa, Hawaii

===== Other concentrated and historical Japanese populations in the United States =====
Northern California: In addition to Japantown districts in San Francisco and San Jose, suburbs and neighborhoods with significant Japanese American populations, histories, and/or previously recognized Japantowns included:

- Alameda, California (1.1%)
- Berkeley, California (1.6%)
- Florin, California
- Fresno, California
- Hayward, California (0.5%)
- Livingston, California
- Lower Haight, San Francisco, California
- Mountain View, California (2.1%)
- Oakland, California (0.5%)
- Palo Alto, California (2.0%)
- Sacramento, California (highest concentration per capita in California prior to WW2 at 5.6%)
- San Mateo, California (2.2%)
- Salinas, California
- Santa Clara, California (1.5%)
- South San Francisco, California
- Sunnyvale, California
- Walnut Creek, California
- Walnut Grove, California.
- Watsonville, California (0.8%)
- Woodland, California

Southern California:

- Duarte, California
- Fontana, California
- Costa Mesa, California
- Long Beach, California (0.6%)
- Orange County, California
- Oxnard, California
- Palm Desert, California (Coachella-Imperial valleys)
- San Bernardino, California (Inland Empire and Riverside area)
- Sawtelle Boulevard, West Los Angeles, Los Angeles, California
- Terminal Island (Port of Los Angeles)
- Gardena, California
- Torrance, California – Called "the Japanese 47th prefecture"
- Vista, California (North county-San Diego area)
- Wintersburg Village, California

Pacific Islands:

- Honolulu, Hawaii – constituted 43% of Hawaii's population in 1920. They now number about 16.7%.

Elsewhere in western U.S.

- Lower Colorado River Valley, Arizona

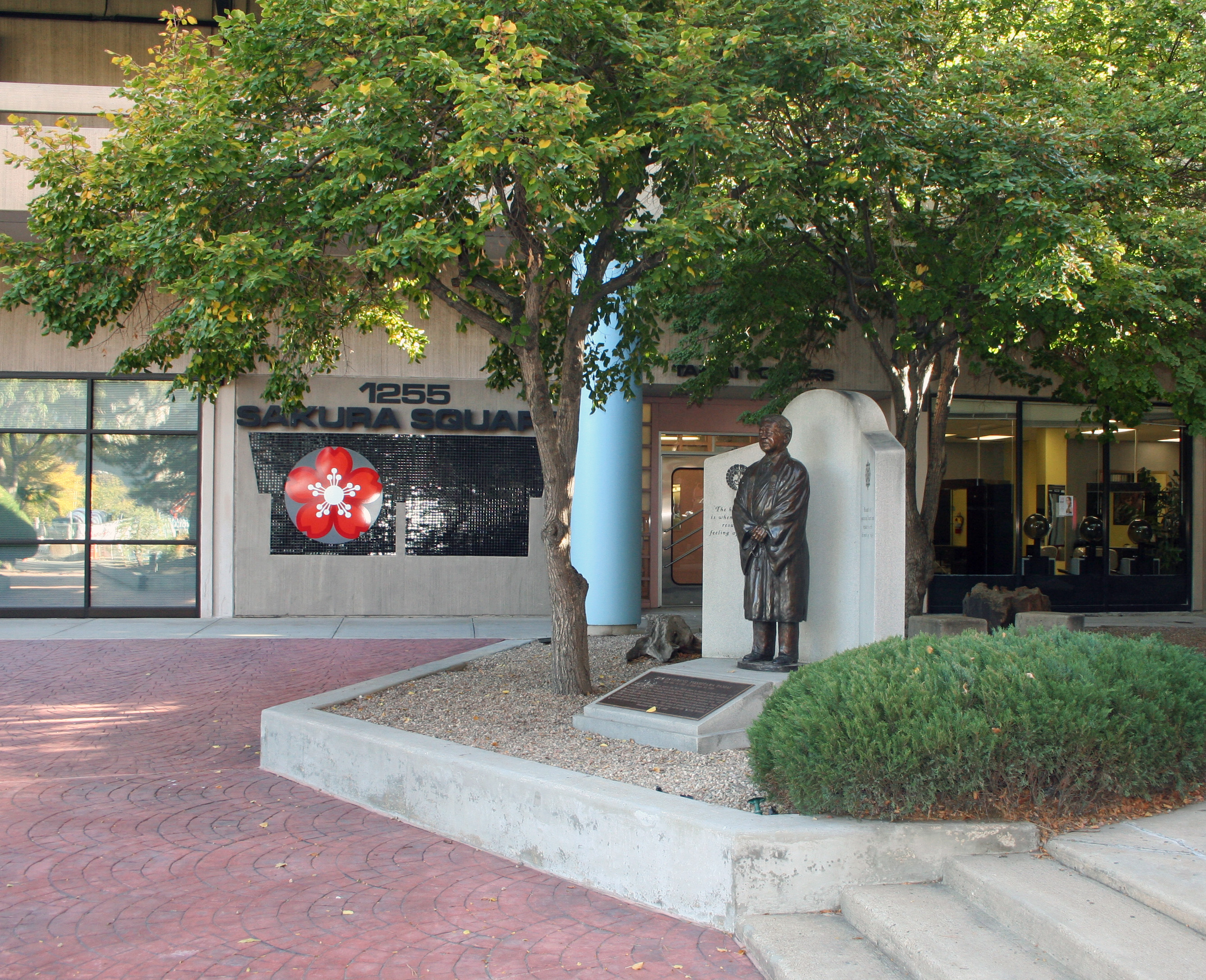
Sakura Square, Denver, Colorado

- Sakura Square, Denver, Colorado
- Grand Avenue, Phoenix, Arizona (east end of the road)
- Las Vegas, Nevada – Many are from Hawaii
- Ontario, Oregon (1.6%)
- Portland, Oregon
- Japantown Street, Salt Lake City, Utah

Eastern U.S.:

- North Side, Chicago and Northwestern Chicago metro area, Illinois
- Boston, Massachusetts
- Porter Square, Cambridge, Massachusetts
- Quincy, Massachusetts
- Novi, Michigan near Detroit
- Seabrook, New Jersey
- St. Mark's Place, East Village, New York City (there are 150,000 Japanese in NYC)
- Westchester County, New York (i.e. Scarsdale – largest Asian-American town in New York state)
- Dublin, Ohio
- Northern Virginia

=== Asia ===
==== Cambodia ====
- St 63 and St 422 (Trasak Paem), Phnom Penh

==== China ====
- Gubei, Shanghai, a residential area which has many expatriates from Japan. It is informally referred to as a "Little Tokyo." There is a Takashimaya department store in Gubei.
- Eastern District, Hong Kong is the home to the largest Japanese community in Hong Kong, where it is widely distributed in district such as Taikoo Shing, with nearly a quarter of total Japanese in Hong Kong. The Hong Kong Japanese School is also settled their headquarter in Eastern district.
  - More than 50 percent of Kowloon Japanese residents live in Hung Hom in Kowloon City District, as one of the most popular area in Hong Kong for Japanese, it is called as "Little Japan" or Hong Kong's "Shitamachi (Japanese: 下町) when there is great concentration with Japanese restaurants with traditional style.
  - Furthermore, there is also a Japanese school campus in Tai Po area in the New Territories.

==== India ====
- Sataku, Haldia

==== Malaysia ====
In the late 2000s, Malaysia began to become a popular destination for Japanese retirees. Malaysia My Second Home retirement programme received 513 Japanese applicants from 2002 until 2006. Motivations for choosing Malaysia include the low cost of real-estate and of hiring home care workers. Such retirees sometimes refer to themselves ironically as economic migrants or even economic refugees, referring to the fact that they could not afford as high a quality of life in retirement, or indeed to retire at all, were they still living in Japan.

- Mont Kiara, Kuala Lumpur
- Little Japan, Taman Molek, Johor Bahru
- Jalan Bendahara, Ipoh
- Jalan Air Itam, Penang

==== Philippines ====
- Japantown, Makati Philippines at Top of The Glo Glorietta Mall
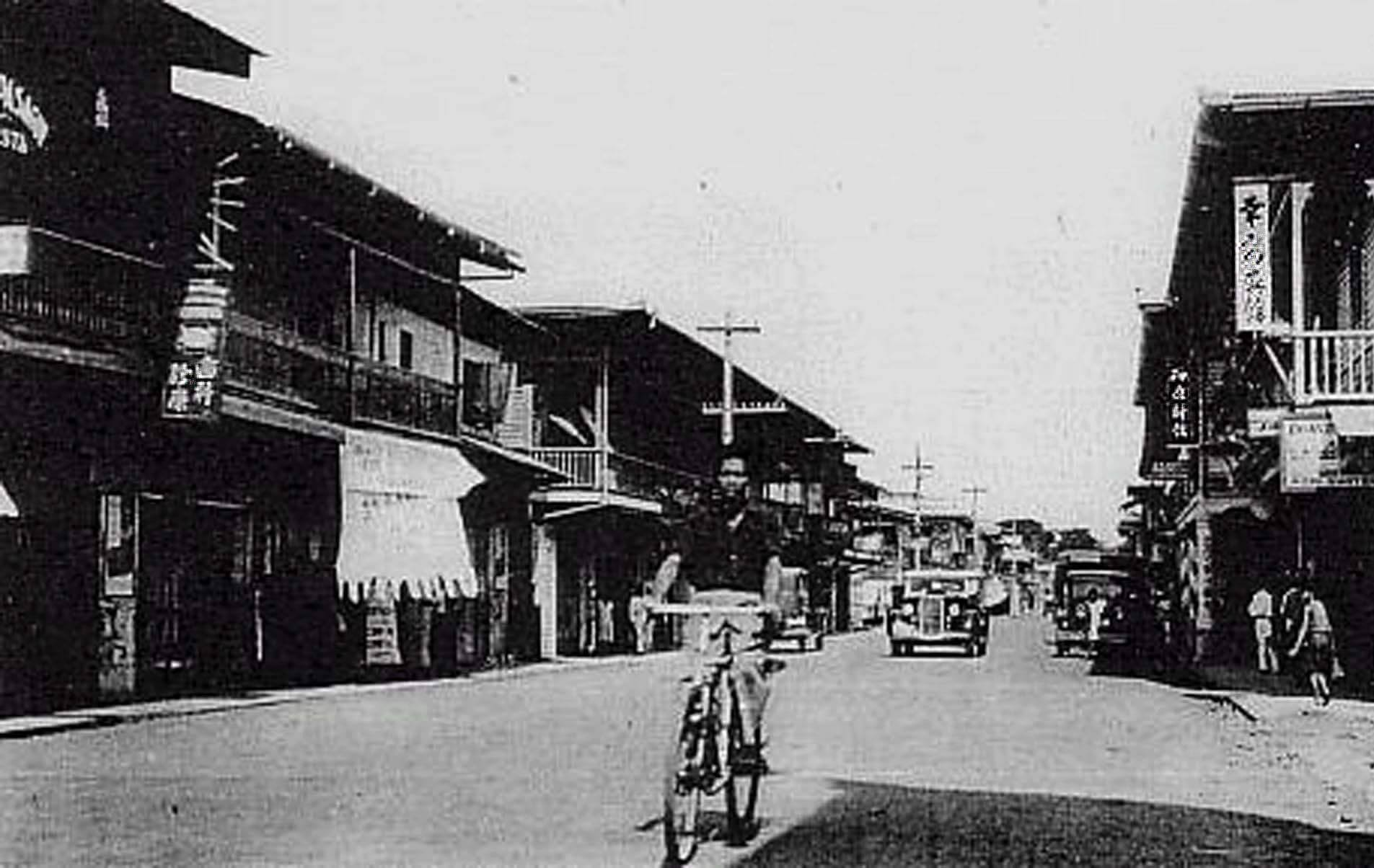
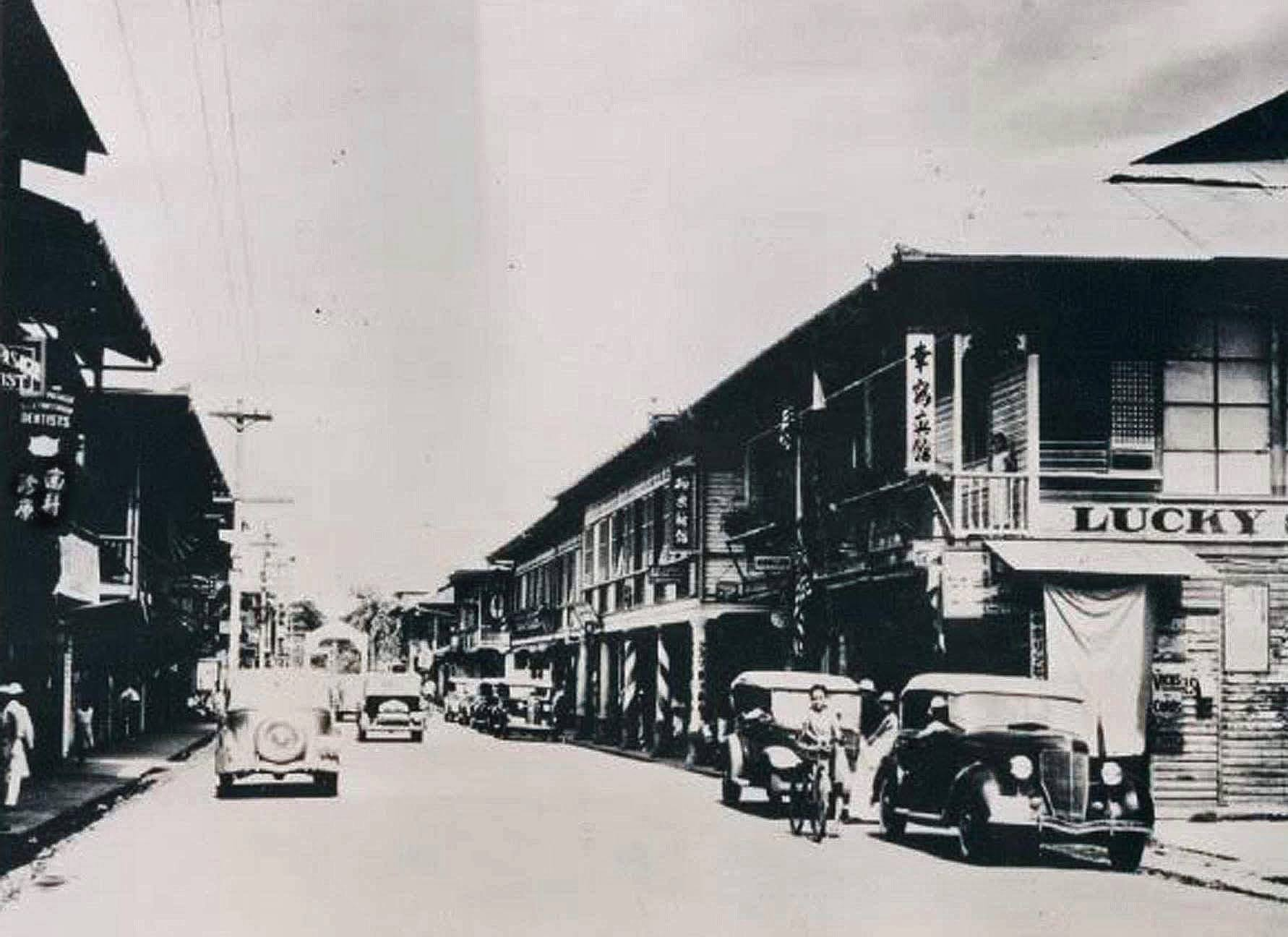
  Little Tokyo (Mintal) in Davao City (1936)
- Japantown, Paco, Manila
- Japantown, Iloilo City
- Japantown, Cebu City
- Japantown, Mandaue
- Japantown, Davao City
- Little Tokyo, Davao City
- Little Tokyo, Makati. This Japanese neighborhood can be found along the stretch of Chino Roces Avenue and neighboring streets in the area approximately between Rufino Street and Arnaiz Avenue.
- Mintal, a barangay in Davao City known as Little Tokyo.
- Little Kyoto, Cebu City

==== Singapore ====
- Middle Road was historically a centre for the Japanese community in Singapore in the 19th and early 20th century prior to the Second World War. A small Japanese community began forming in the area around Middle Road in the 1880s and 1890s. The core of this community were the karayuki-san, Japanese prostitutes who worked in a red-light district around Malay Street, Malabar Street, and Hylam Street (present-day Bugis Junction). Various shops like the clothier Echigoya and services like the clinic of Dr. Nishimura Takeshiro that catered to the karayuki-san were established near Middle Road. As the community grew, they were followed by new institutions such as the Toyo Hotel, the Harima Hall cinema, and the Japanese Association. Particularly after 1910, when many Japanese firms established offices in the present-day CBD, the impact of the Japanese community could also be seen well beyond Middle Road.
- Clarke Quay
- Orchard Road

==== South Korea ====
- Yongsan District, Seoul

==== Taiwan ====
- Tianmu, Taipei, Taiwan
- Linsen North Road, Taipei, Taiwan

==== Vietnam ====
- Le Thanh Ton Street, District 1, Ho Chi Minh City.

==== Concentrated and historical Japanese populations in Asia ====
===== Indonesia =====
- Parts of Jakarta's shopping district of Blok M has been developed into the formation of Japanese-oriented facilities, including clusters of restaurants, spas, nightclubs, bars, karaoke parlors and cafés; earning the nickname "Little Tokyo", as it is also coupled with the high density of Japanese expats living around the area.
- A district in Batam, was dubbed as "Nagoya" after the Japanese city by the same name by Japanese engineers from the Taisei Corporation and expats who came to Batam in the 1970s to work on its infrastructure projects. officially the district is known as Lubuk Baja, Until 2005, the area was known for its karaoke parlors, Japanese-style bars and prostitution. Most of which are no longer present, save for a number of Japanese styled restaurants and karaoke bars.
- In addition of being Surabaya's Chinatown, the Kya Kya district is also historically known as "Kembang Jepun" (lit. 'Japanese flowers') due to the abundance of Karayuki-san prostitutes there. As well as Japanese brothels and taverns within the district during the colonial days of Indonesia.
- At Cikarang, which is known as the Industrial center of the country, also had a significant community of Japanese expatriates in the city, mostly due to the abundance of Japanese companies investing in the area and setting up factories there. They are mostly concentrated within the Jababeka Industrial estate, out of Cikarang's ten thousand expatriate community, roughly around seven thousand of them are Japanese, there is also a Japanese school in Cikarang.

===== Pakistan =====
- There is an active Japanese presence (including multinational companies and expatriates) in industrial areas of Karachi, such as Port Qasim. During the 1980s and 1990s, there were over 2,000 Japanese living in Karachi, making them one of the significant expatriate communities in the country. Now, the community has shrunk to a few hundred. There is also a Karachi Japanese School.

===== Thailand =====
- In Bangkok a Japanese population lives in and around Sukhumvit Road, Thong Lo and Phrompong. Many of the apartment complexes are rented solely to Japanese people (although they are owned by Thais), and there are Japanese grocery shops, restaurants, bars, dry cleaning, clubs, etc. in and around Phrompong.
- In Si Racha a Japanese population lives in and around the city center as the second largest Japanese community outside Bangkok.
- In Chiangmai a Japanese population lives around the city center as the popular place for Japanese retirees with good weather and less crowded city.
- In Ayutthaya a growing number of Japanese population returns and lives in and around Rojana Road close to many Japanese companies, the city also well known place of the first Japanese quarter in Thailand dated back to 16th century, the Ban Yipun.

=== Europe ===
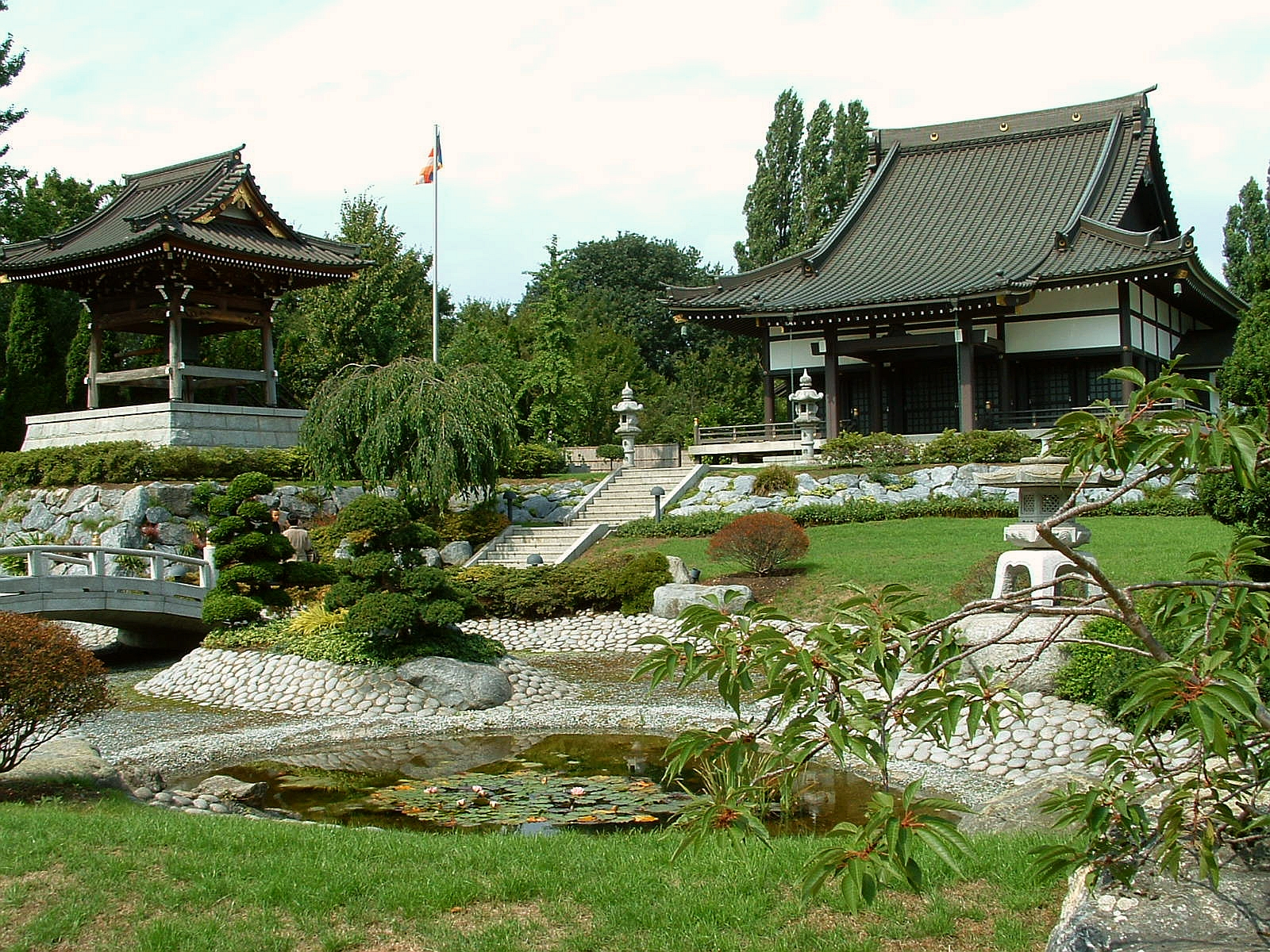
Eko Haus of Japanese Culture

==== Germany ====
- Düsseldorf has the largest Japanese population in Germany. The Japanese community of Düsseldorf grew from an area Immermannstraße nearby Düsseldorf Central Station, nicknamed "Little Tokyo", where Japanese offices and stores are concentrated. Düsseldorf is home to Japanese companies since the 1960s. Today Düsseldorf has a Japanese international school and a Japanese Temple called Eko Haus, which are both located in Niederkassel.

==== United Kingdom ====
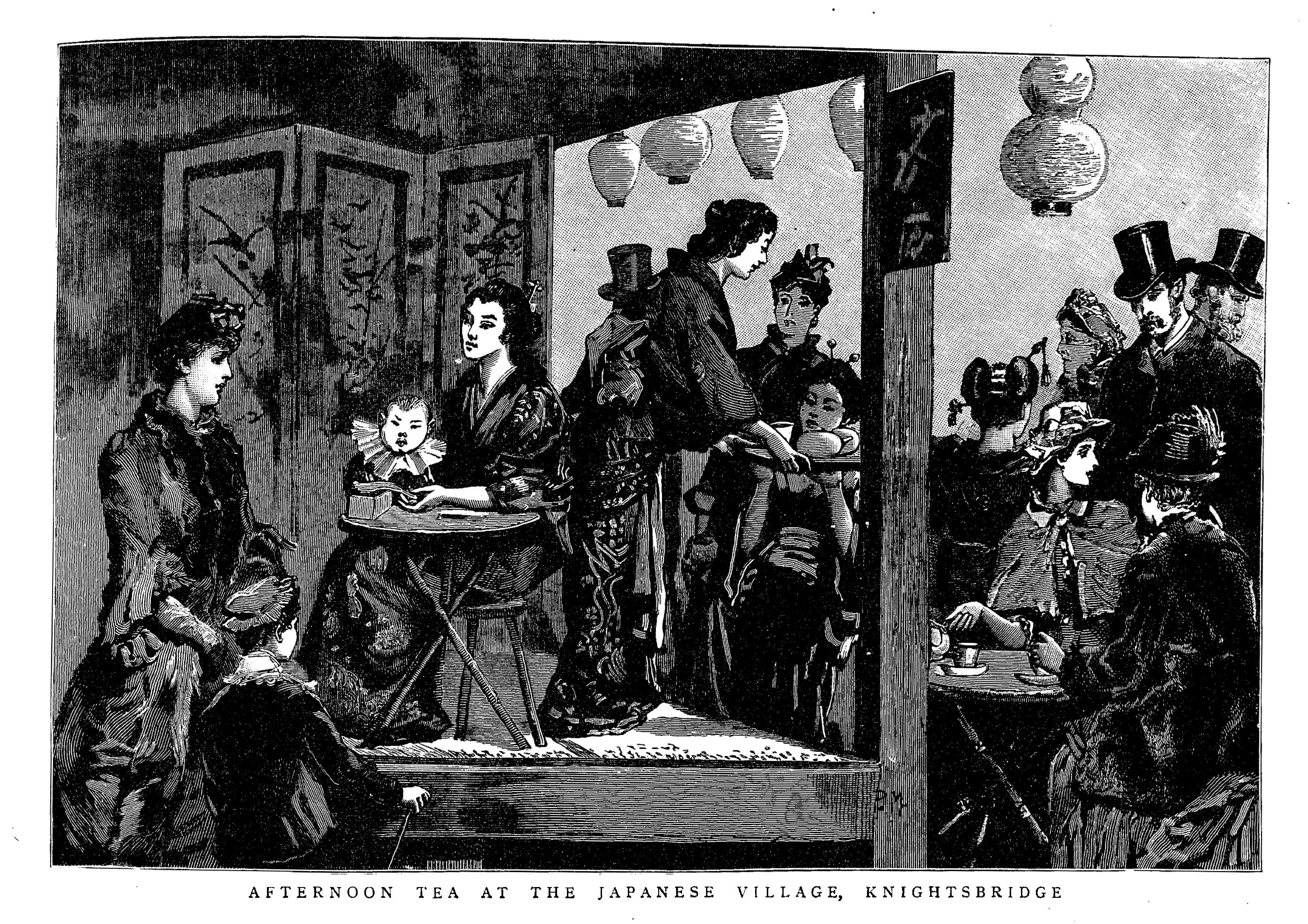
Japanese Village in Knightsbridge, 1886

- From 1885 until 1887, in the Victorian era, there was a "Japanese Village" in Knightsbridge, London, organised by Tannaker Buhicrosan
- London is home to the largest Japanese community in the United Kingdom, with Acton and Finchley having the higher concentrations of Japanese residents. North London is a popular area in London for Japanese residents to live.

==== France ====
- Paris has a Japanese community. Its Japanese restaurants and shops are concentrated near the Opéra Garnier (especially on Rue Sainte-Anne) and the city's Japanese population is largely concentrated in 15th arrondissement and 16th arrondissement.

==== Spain ====
Since the late 1970s-early 1980s many Japanese companies chose Spain to set themselves.

==== The Netherlands ====
- Amstelveen
- Buitenveldert

=== Oceania ===
==== Australia ====
- Little Tokyo, Adelaide
- Japantown, Darwin
- Artarmon, Sydney has a small Japantown by the railway station, containing Japanese restaurants, Japanese grocery stores and a Japanese bookshop. Nearby suburbs such as Northbridge and St Leonards also have a number of Japanese businesses.
- Gold Coast, Queensland has a big Japanese population which is still rising.

== See also ==
- Chinatown
- Koreatown
- Ethnic enclave
- Japanese diaspora
- Little Saigon
- Little Manila
- List of named ethnic enclaves in North American cities
- List of named ethnic enclaves in Philippine cities
