= 1951 San Francisco mayoral election =

- November 6, 1951
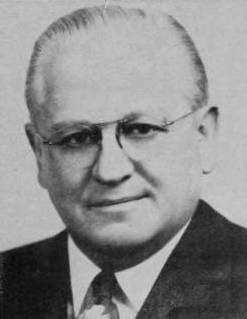

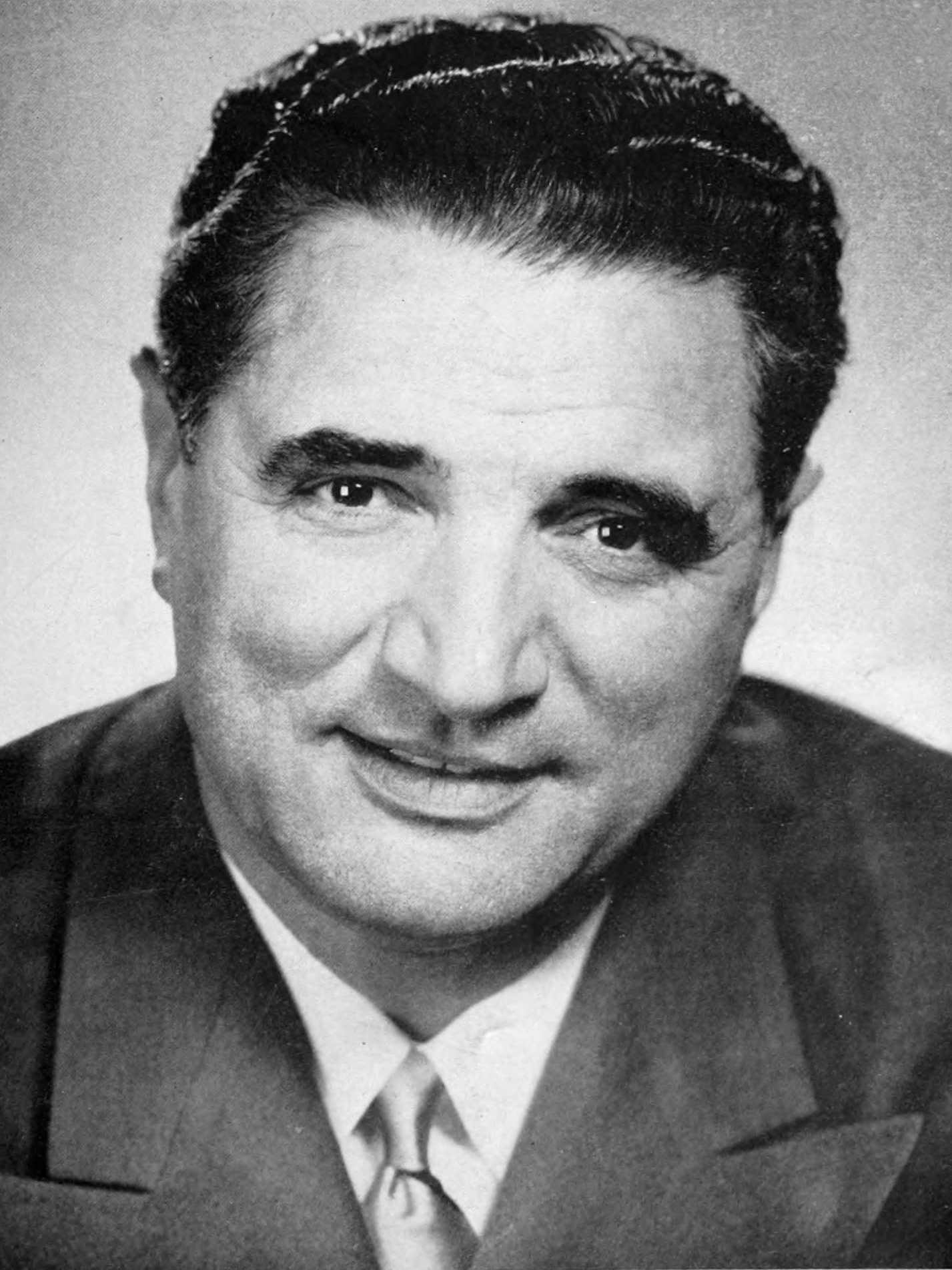

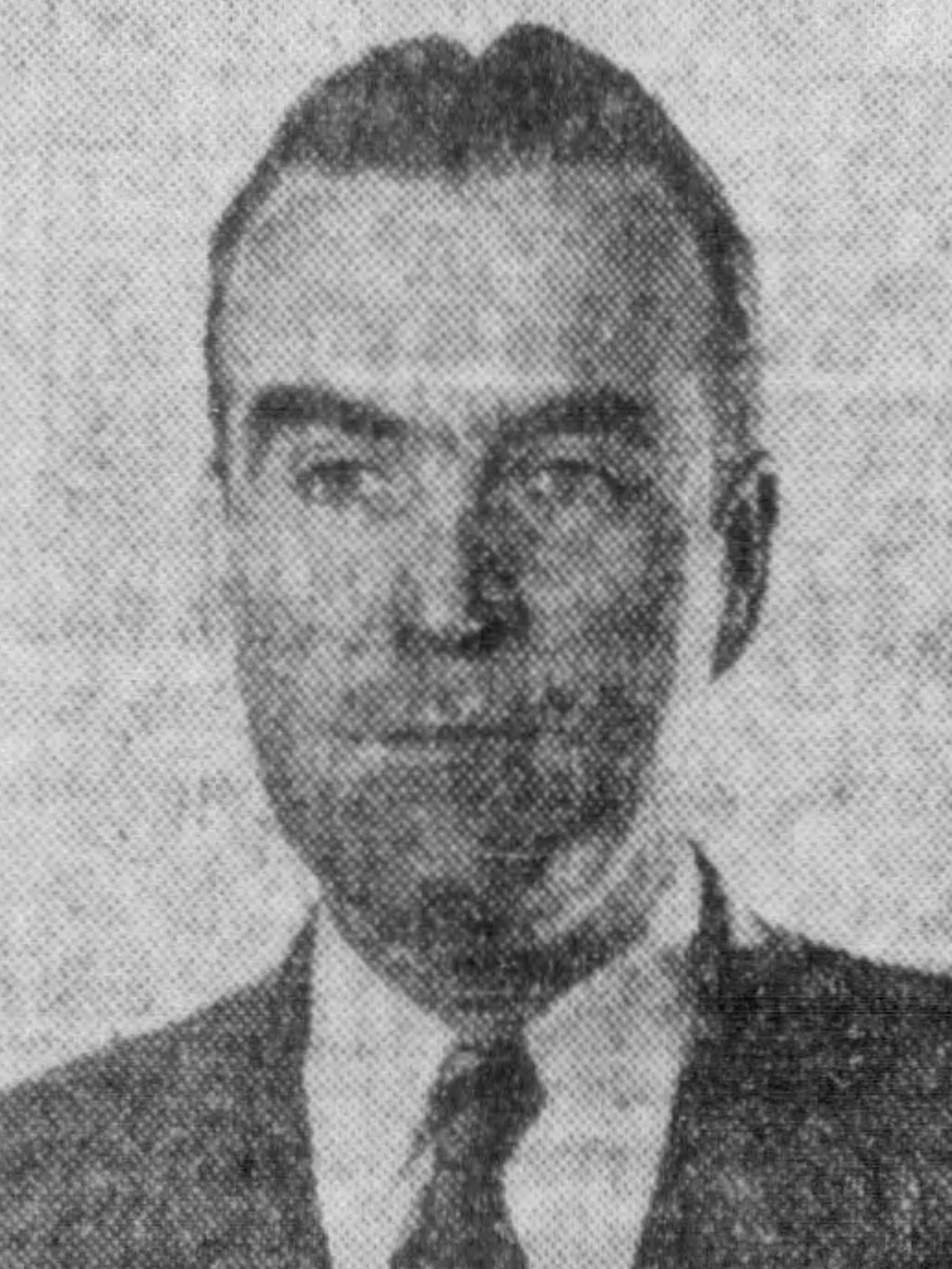
Candidate	Elmer Robinson	George Christopher	J. Joseph Sullivan
Party	Republican	Republican	Nonpartisan
Popular vote	98,611	96,685	52,013
Percentage	38.60%	37.84%	20.36%
Mayor before election
Elmer Robinson
Republican
Elected mayor
Elmer Robinson
Republican

The 1951 San Francisco mayoral election was held on November 6, 1951. Incumbent mayor Elmer Robinson narrowly won re-election with 38% of the vote.

== Results ==
1951 San Francisco mayoral election
Candidate	Votes	%
Elmer Robinson	98,611	38.60%
George Christopher	96,685	37.84%
J. Joseph Sullivan	52,013	20.36%
August R. "Gus" Oliva	5,172	2.02%
Frank A. Barbaria	1,714	0.67%
James F. Brennan	1,307	0.51%
