= 1962 California lieutenant gubernatorial election =

- November 6, 1962
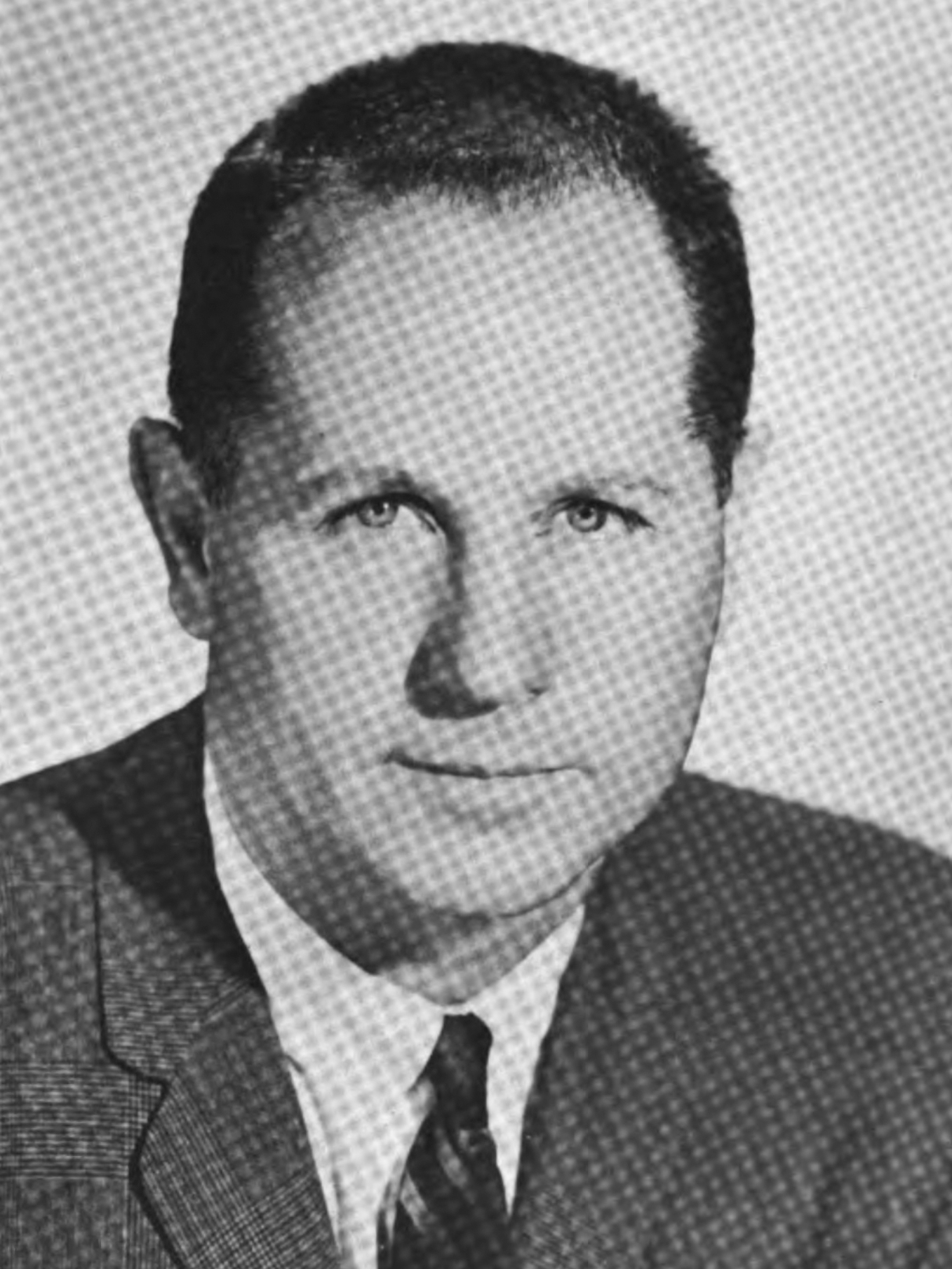

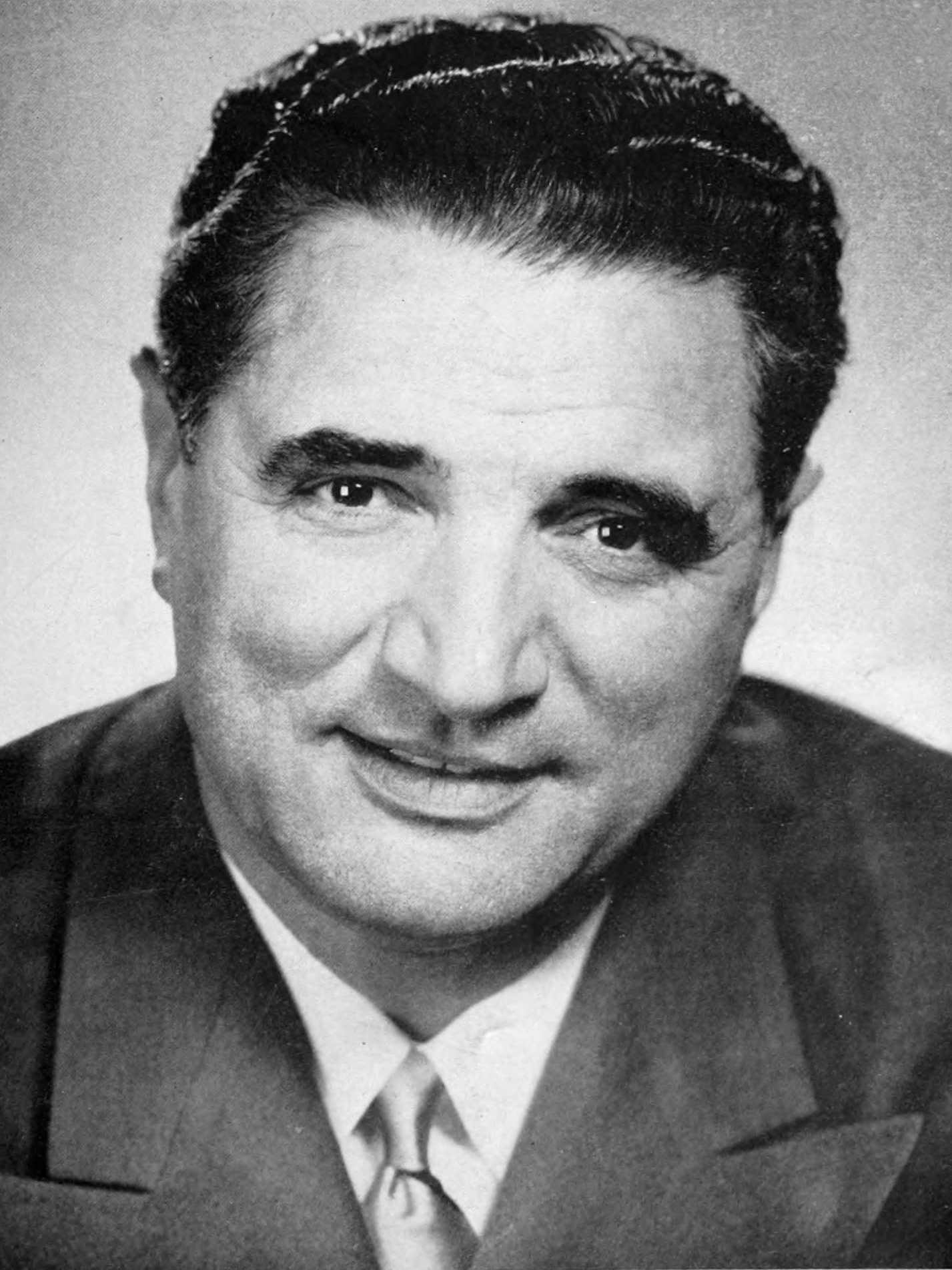
Nominee	Glenn M. Anderson	George Christopher
Party	Democratic	Republican
Popular vote	2,957,640	2,793,957
Percentage	51.42%	48.58%
- County results Anderson: 50–60% 60–70% Christopher: 50–60% 60–70%
Lieutenant Governor before election
Glenn M. Anderson
Democratic
Elected Lieutenant Governor
Glenn M. Anderson
Democratic

The 1962 California lieutenant gubernatorial election was held on November 6, 1962. Democratic incumbent Glenn M. Anderson narrowly defeated Republican nominee George Christopher with 51.42% of the vote.

== Primary elections ==
William McKesson, the Los Angeles County district attorney, unsuccessfully challenged incumbent lieutenant governor Glenn M. Anderson in the Democratic Party's primary. Anderson won a landslide victory over McKesson and minor candidate Brainin Treskunoff. McKesson's campaign saw him lodge strong personal attacks against Anderson in the closing days of the campaign. Herbert L. Phillips of The Sacramento Bee saw McKesson's campaign's performance as "surprisingly weak".

Mayor of San Francisco George Christopher won a landslide victory in the Republican primary in a two-way race against State Senator John F. McCarthy (the minority caucus leader in the California State Senate).

== General election ==
=== Candidates ===
- Glenn M. Anderson, Democratic
- George Christopher, Republican

=== Results ===
1962 California lieutenant gubernatorial election
Party	Candidate	Votes	%	±%
Democratic	Glenn M. Anderson (incumbent)	2,957,640	51.42%	+0.55%
Republican	George Christopher	2,793,957	48.58%	−0.55%
Majority		163,683		
Turnout				
Democratic hold		Swing		
