= 1947 San Francisco mayoral election =

- November 4, 1947
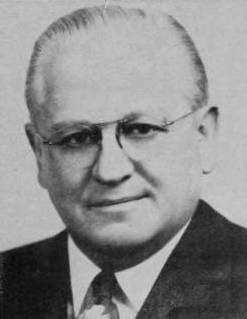

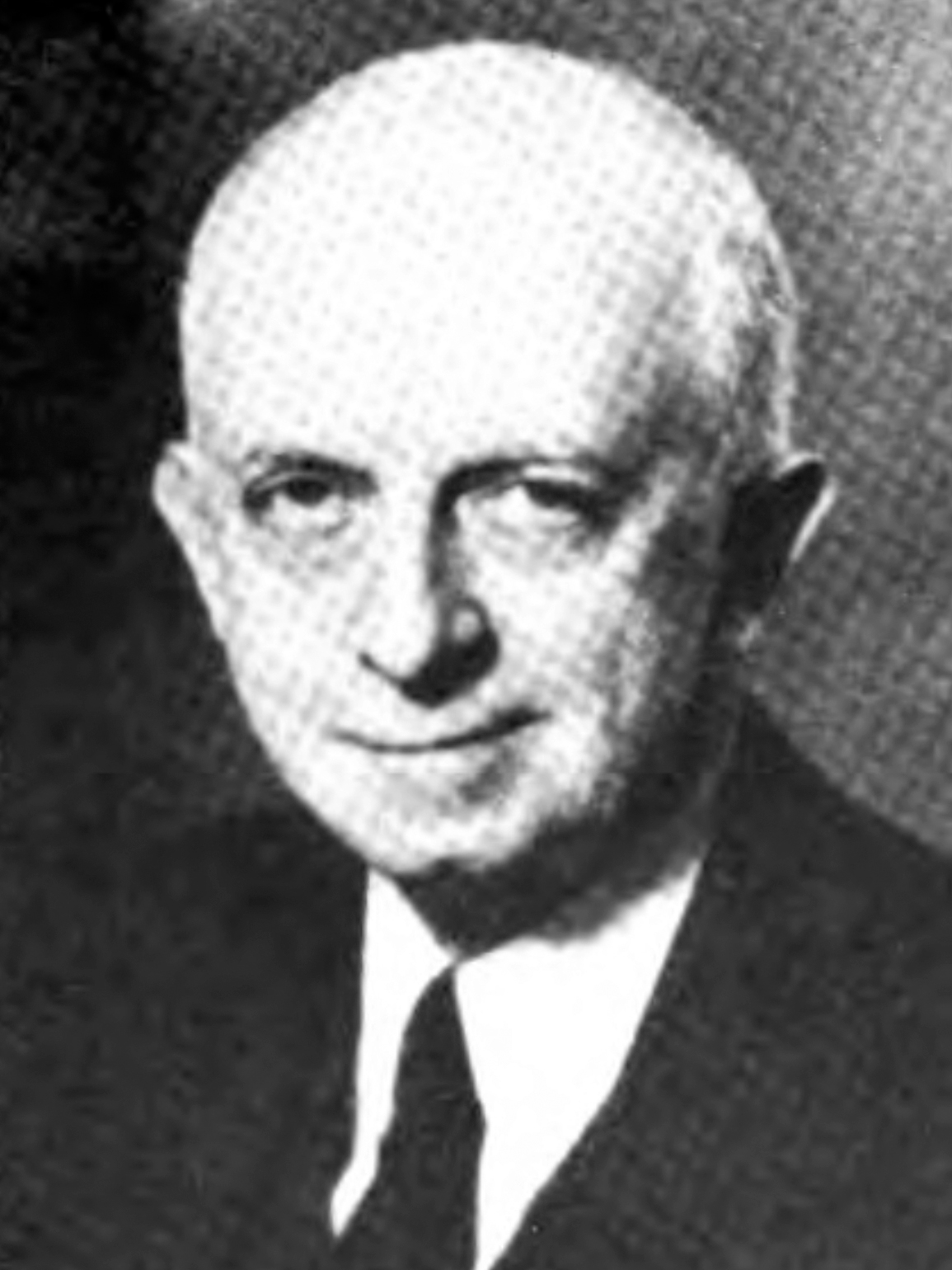

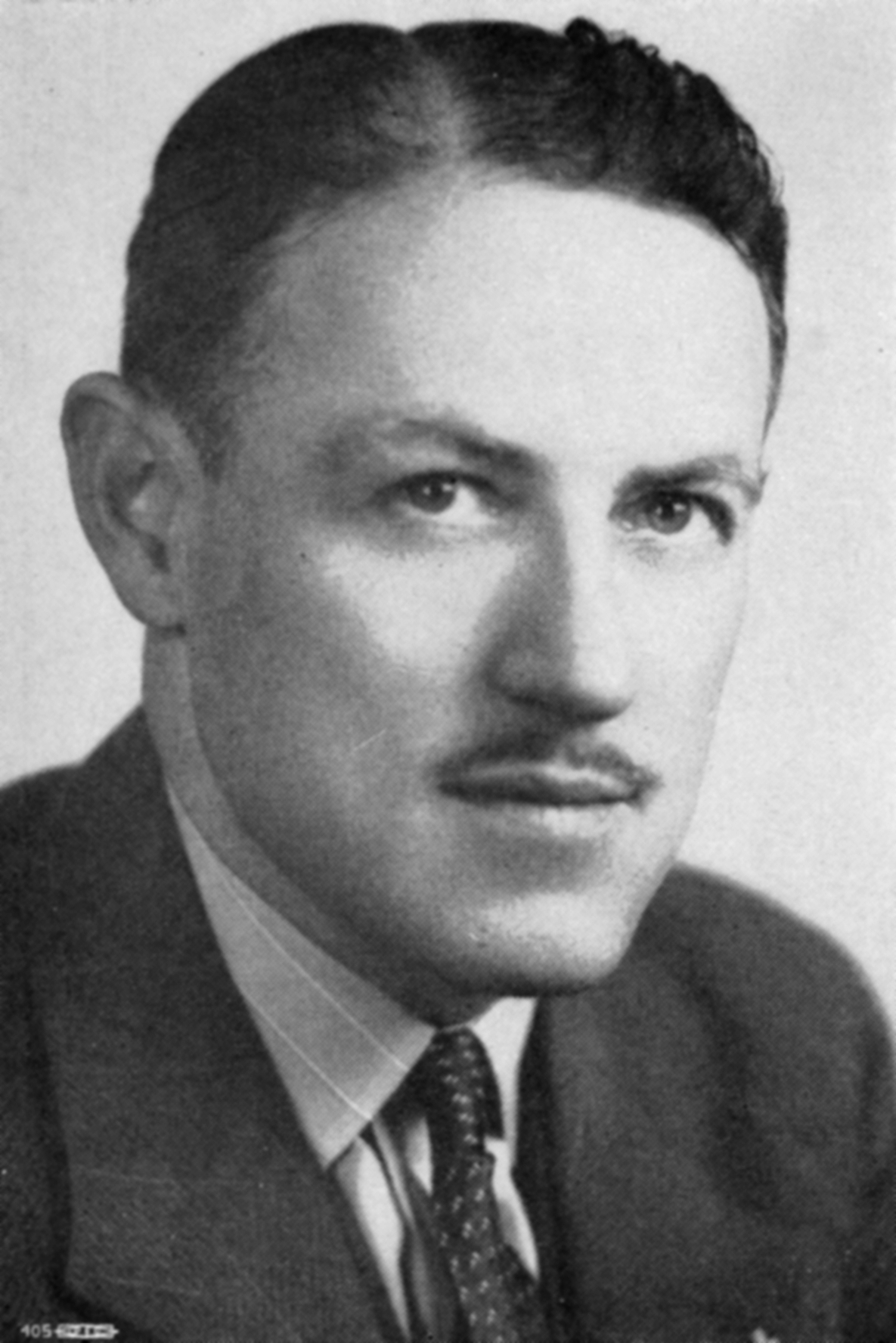
Candidate	Elmer Robinson	Franck R. Havenner	Chester MacPhee
Party	Republican	Democratic	Nonpartisan
Popular vote	117,503	102,100	60,651
Percentage	41.70%	36.23%	21.52%
Mayor before election
Roger Lapham
Republican
Elected mayor
Elmer Robinson
Republican

The 1947 San Francisco mayoral election was held on November 4, 1947. Elmer Robinson was elected with 41% of the vote.

== Results ==
1947 San Francisco mayoral election
Candidate	Votes	%
Elmer Robinson	117,503	41.70%
Franck R. Havenner	102,100	36.23%
Chester MacPhee	60,651	21.52%
Frank A. Barbaria	1,559	0.55%
