= 1959 San Francisco mayoral election =

- November 3, 1959
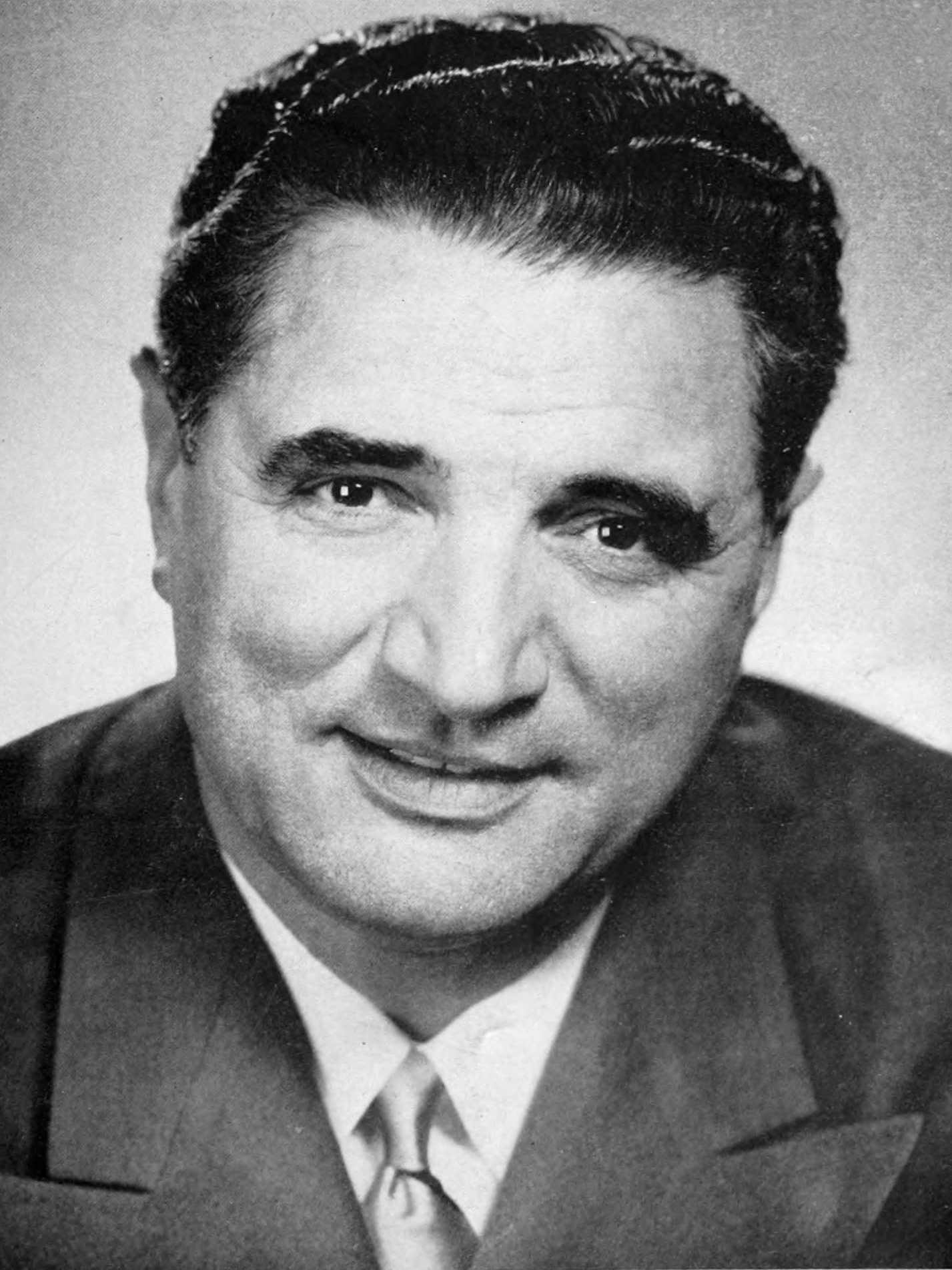

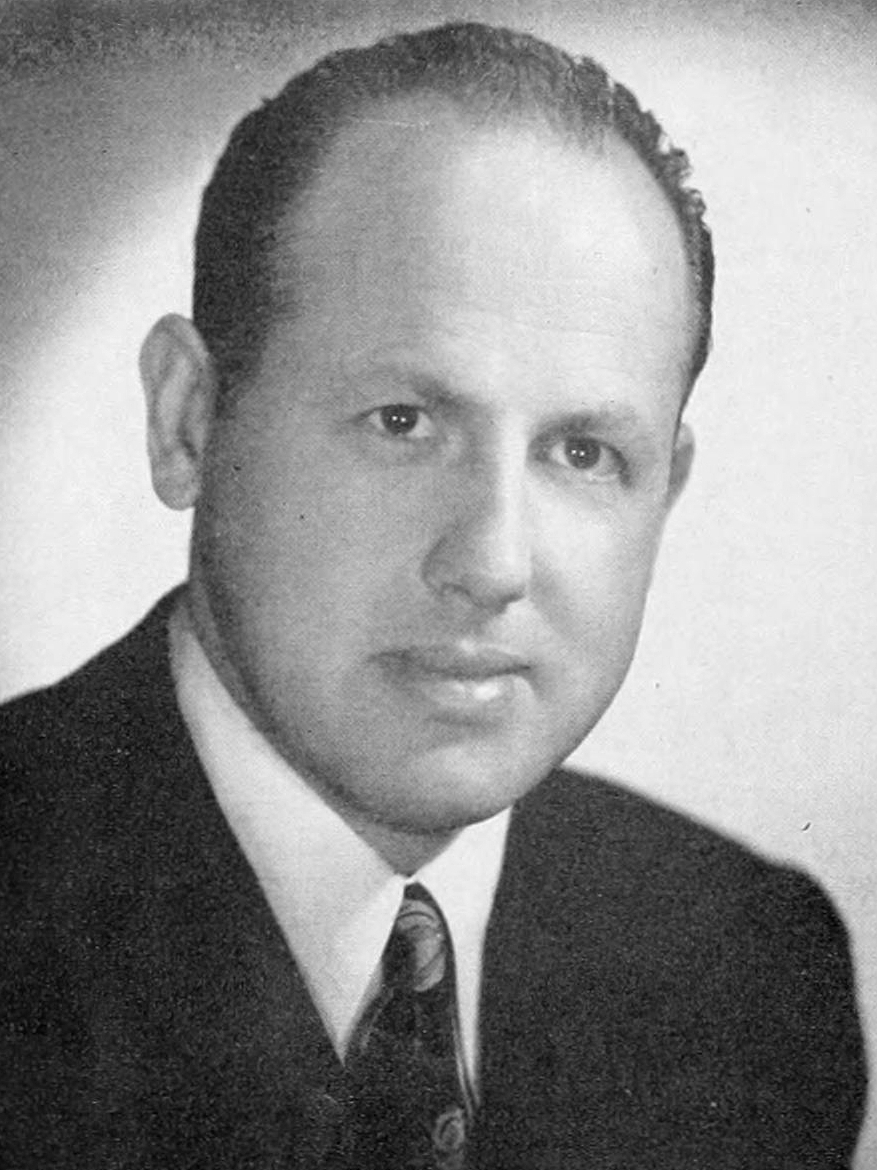
Candidate	George Christopher	Russell L. Wolden Jr.
Party	Republican	Nonpartisan
Popular vote	145,009	92,252
Percentage	59.06%	37.57%
Mayor before election
George Christopher
Republican
Elected mayor
George Christopher
Republican

The 1959 San Francisco mayoral election was held on November 3, 1959, with incumbent George Christopher being reelected with 59% percent of the vote. As of 2023, this is the last time a Republican has been elected mayor of San Francisco.

== Results ==
1959 San Francisco mayoral election
Candidate	Votes	%
George Christopher	145,009	59.06%
Russell L. Wolden, Jr.	92,252	37.57%
Earl David "Maxie" Brown	2,162	0.88%
Joseph "Troc" Ferrara	2,144	0.87%
Joan Jordan	1,380	0.56%
Willard R. Yuna	904	0.37%
Jean Steiner	868	0.35%
Marie Antoinette LePleux	831	0.34%
Total votes:	245,550	-
