= Japanese Village, Knightsbridge =

Coordinates: 51.5015°N 0.1639°W

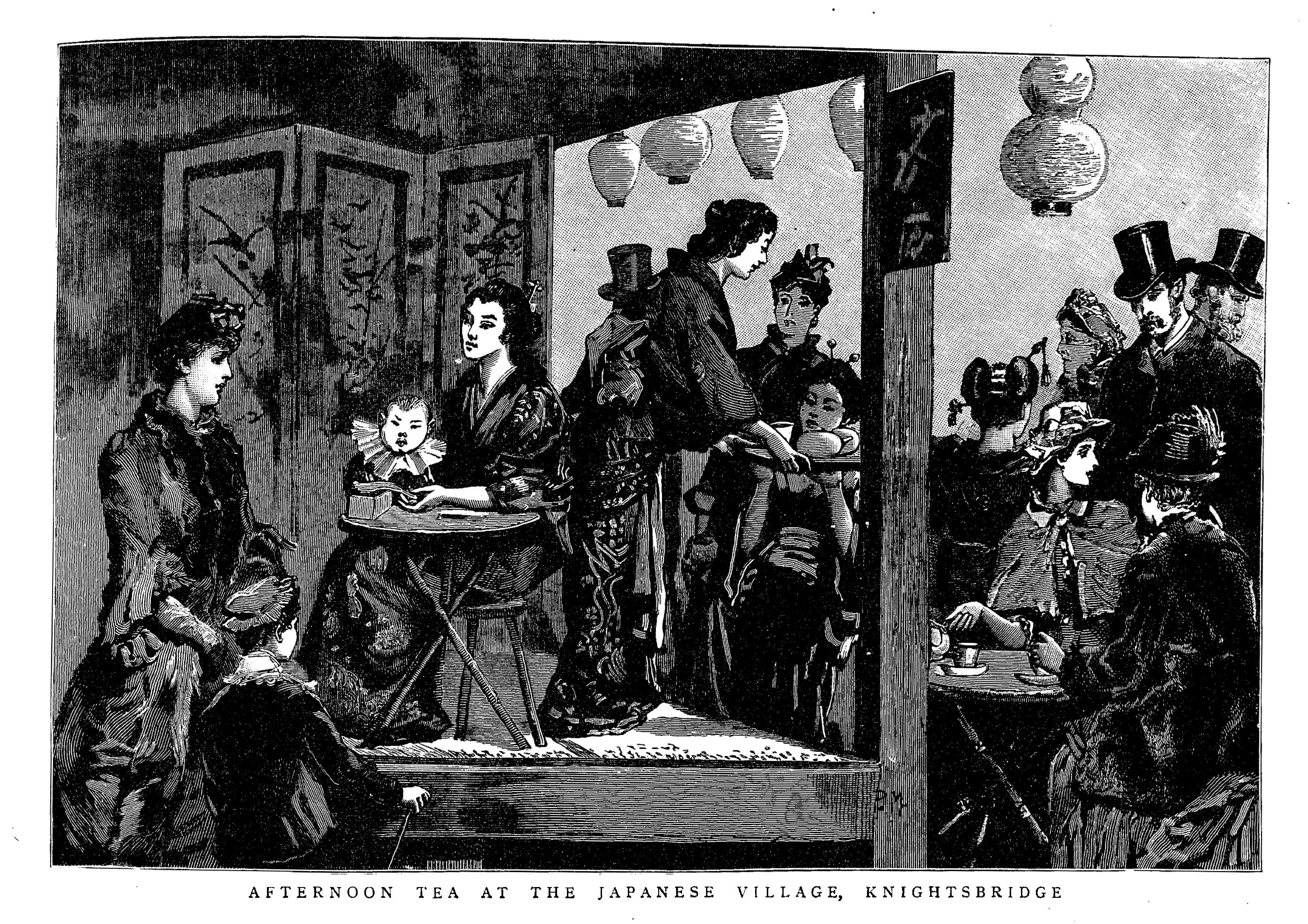
Japanese Village in Knightsbridge, 1886

The Japanese Village in Knightsbridge, London, was a late Victorian era exhibition of Japanese culture which took place from January 1885 until June 1887 in Humphrey's Hall. Japanese art and culture had become extremely popular in Victorian England by the 1880s, and more than a million people visited the Village. The exhibition employed around 100 Japanese men and women in a setting built to resemble a traditional Japanese village. The exhibit burnt down in May 1885 but was rebuilt and expanded. It reopened the following December.

== Background ==
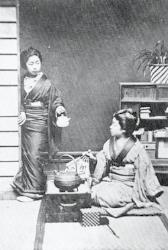
Photo taken at the Village by W. S. Gilbert

As a result of the opening up of Japan to trade with Britain in the 1850s, an English craze for all things Japanese had developed through the 1860s and 1870s, fed by the British perception of Japan as a mediaeval culture, and it greatly increased imports of Japanese art, design and decorative objects to Britain. The fad resonated particularly with devotees of the Aesthetic movement of the late nineteenth century. The planned exhibition was announced in the financial section of The London and China Express on 11 January 1884; it was expected to take a team of Japanese workers seven months to build.

The exhibition was a commercial venture organised by Tannaker Buhicrosan (c. 1841–1894), who had been organising travelling Japanese exhibitions and performances in Britain for several years beforehand. After performances of his Japanese Troupe, Buhicrosan often gave Japanese objects to each person who attended. He sometimes offered his entertainments to workhouses free of charge, and he was known to contribute money to disaster appeals such as the Tay Bridge disaster. He stated that the goal of the Village was to raise money for a mission, led by his British-Japanese Christian wife, Ruth Otake Buhicrosan (1851–1914), to help women in Japan.

== Description ==
The exhibition was built to resemble a traditional Japanese village, completely contained within Humphreys' Hall (which was south of Knightsbridge and east of what is now Trevor Street). It employed around 100 Japanese men and women, and included segregated sleeping accommodation. According to advertisements placed in the Illustrated London News:

Skilled Japanese artisans and workers (male and female) will illustrate the manners, customs, and art-industries of their country, attired in their national and picturesque costumes. Magnificently decorated and illuminated Buddhist temple. Five o’clock tea in the Japanese tea-house. Japanese Musical and other Entertainments. Every-day Life as in Japan.

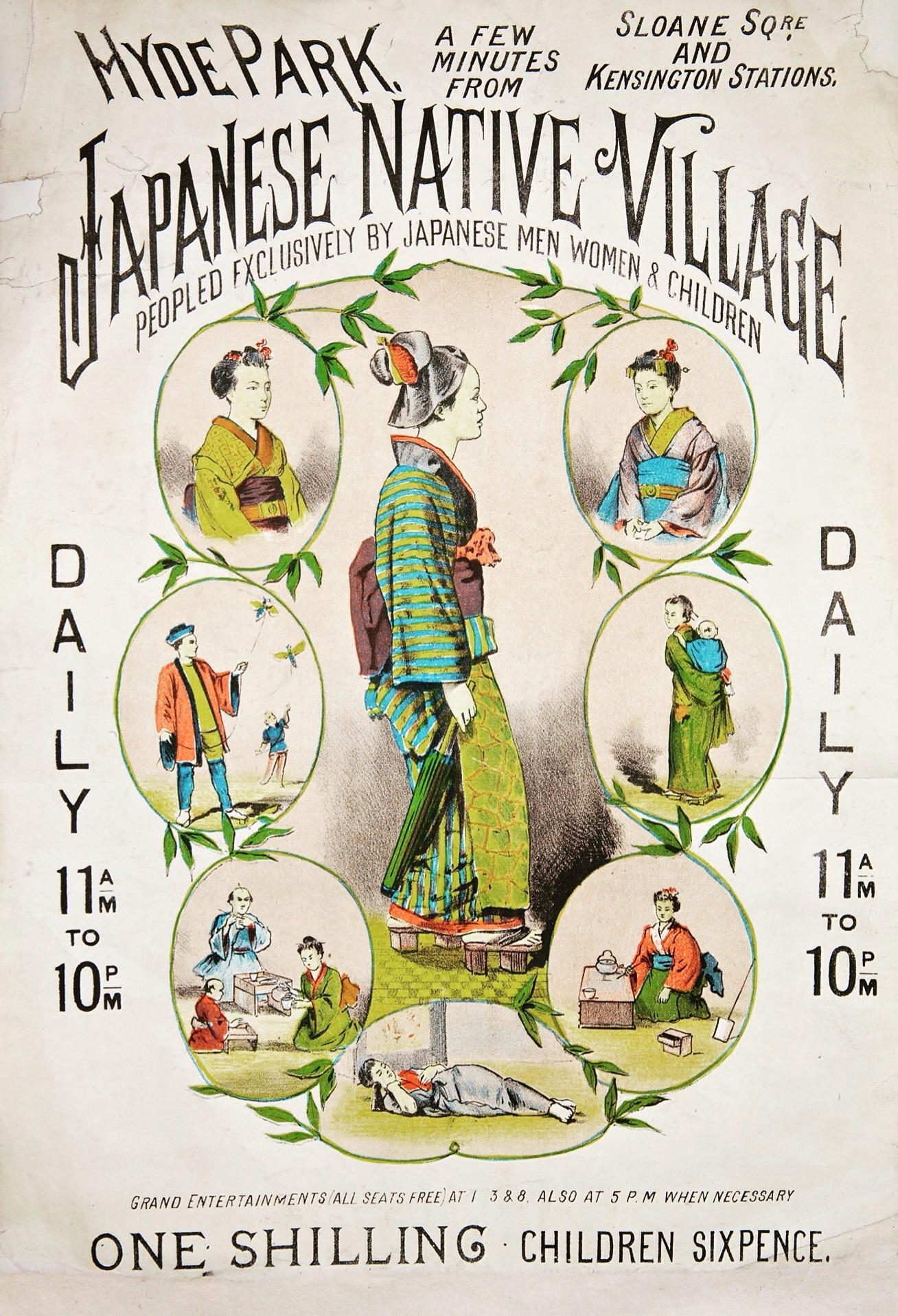
Poster

The Village was opened on 10 January 1885 by Rutherford Alcock, a diplomat who had served in Japan and had organised the Japanese stand at the 1862 International Exhibition in London. It included of a street lined with shops made of bamboo, wood and paper, some with thatched roofs, another row of smaller shops, a Buddhist temple and a garden. It was an immediate success and had more than 250,000 visitors during its early months. While Gilbert and Sullivan were writing their opera The Mikado in 1885, W. S. Gilbert visited the exhibition and engaged Japanese people from the village to teach his cast aspects of Japanese behaviour and dance.

London authorities were concerned about the safety of the exhibition, which was lighted at night by gas. Buhicrosan was summoned before the Metropolitan Board of Works for failure to get a safety certificate. On 2 May 1885, Humphreys' Hall burnt down, and a Japanese wood carver was killed in the blaze; the fire spread to the adjoining Humphries Mansions and Sun Music Hall. Buhicrosan announced that the hall and the exhibit would be rebuilt as quickly as possible. The exhibit employees were already committed to appear at the 1885 International Hygiene Exhibition in Berlin. They proceeded to fulfill the engagement and then toured in Germany.

Meanwhile, the hall and the village exhibit were both reconstructed; the exhibition was greatly expanded and re-opened to the public on 8 December 1885 with "several streets of shops ... two temples and various free-standing idols, and a pool spanned by a rustic bridge". Buhicrosan sold his stake in the Village in 1887 but ran other Villages and Japanese troupes around England until 1890.

== Closing and legacy ==
The exhibition continued until June 1887. By February 1887, over a million people had visited it. Prominent references to the exhibition are made in the 1999 film Topsy-Turvy and the 2015 novel by Natasha Pulley, The Watchmaker of Filigree Street.
