= Tannaker Buhicrosan =

19th-century entertainment promoter

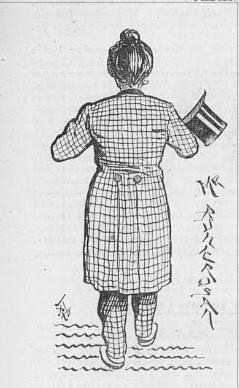
- Drawing of Buhicrosan, 1885 (Illustrated Sporting and Dramatic News)
- Born: William Bellingham Neville c. 1840; Liverpool
- Died: 1894; Lewisham, London
- Occupation: Manager of Japanese performing troupes
- Known for: Japanese Village, Knightsbridge
- Spouse: Otakesan Ohilosan (m. 1879)

Tannaker Buhicrosan (タナカー・ブヒクロサン) (c. 1840 – 10 August 1894) was the proprietor of Japanese performing troupes and the Japanese Village, Knightsbridge, an exhibition in Knightsbridge that ran from 1885 to 1887. The name was an assumed one, and Buhicrosan's origins are obscure.

== Identity ==
Buhicrosan's identity has been the subject of debate. In a 2020 biography, Paul Budden identifies Buhicrosan as being born c. 1840, the son of surgeon William Bellingham Neville who emigrated to Australia in 1843 and his wife Hannah. He was baptised William Bellingham Neville on 10 September 1840 at St Peter's Church, Liverpool. Buhicrosan died in Lewisham in 1894, the name on his death certificate given as Tannaker Bellingham Nevell Buhicrosan. A Japanese biography by Koyama Noboru and the Library of Congress catalogue identify him as Frederik Eduard Marie Martinus Blekman (1839–1894). Blekman was a Dutchman who worked as a Japanese interpreter, set up a troupe of performers in San Francisco, and died in London in 1888.

== Japanese troupes ==
Buhicrosan first appears in the public record as the manager of a troupe of Japanese acrobats and conjurors touring Australia and New Zealand in 1867 and 1868. A reviewer in The New Zealand West Coast Review gave the troupe a tepid review, remarking that Buhicrosan spoke "remarkably good English for a (presumed) native of Japan" and comparing the performance unfavourably with that of other troupes. In December 1868, the Royal Tycoon troupe arrived in Britain and began touring the country. At the same time, Blekman was touring Britain with the Great Dragon Troupe. Blekman's and Buhicrosan's troupes merged in 1871 as the Tycoon Dragon Japanese Troupe, but the promoters went their separate ways the following year, with Buhicrosan taking out a notice in The Era to say that "F Blekman ceased to have any connection" with the Great Dragon Troupe. The Great Dragon Troupe and several additional troupes set up by Buhicrosan continued to tour Britain and the continental Europe. In 1872 newspapers reported that Buhicrosan had been fined £10 for child cruelty, having shut a child in a cupboard for ten hours. In 1874 Buhicrosan bought a house, 44 Hither Green Lane, in Hither Green and in 1879 he married Otakesan Ohilosan, known as Otake or Ruth Otake, with whom he had already had several children. The marriage took place at Manchester Register Office and the certificate stated that they had previously married in Nagasaki in 1868. The couple had eleven children in all. In 1891 their youngest daughter, Chiyo, died aged three from an accidental overdose of morphine, after taking the drug from an unlocked cupboard. At the inquest, Buhicrosan said that he and one of his daughters used the drug as medication.

Capitalising on the vogue for all things Japanese, Buhicrosan set up a trading company to import goods from Japan. The company had premises in Milton Street, Finsbury and then in 1881 moved to Chapel Street, Cripplegate.

== The Japanese Village, Knightsbridge ==
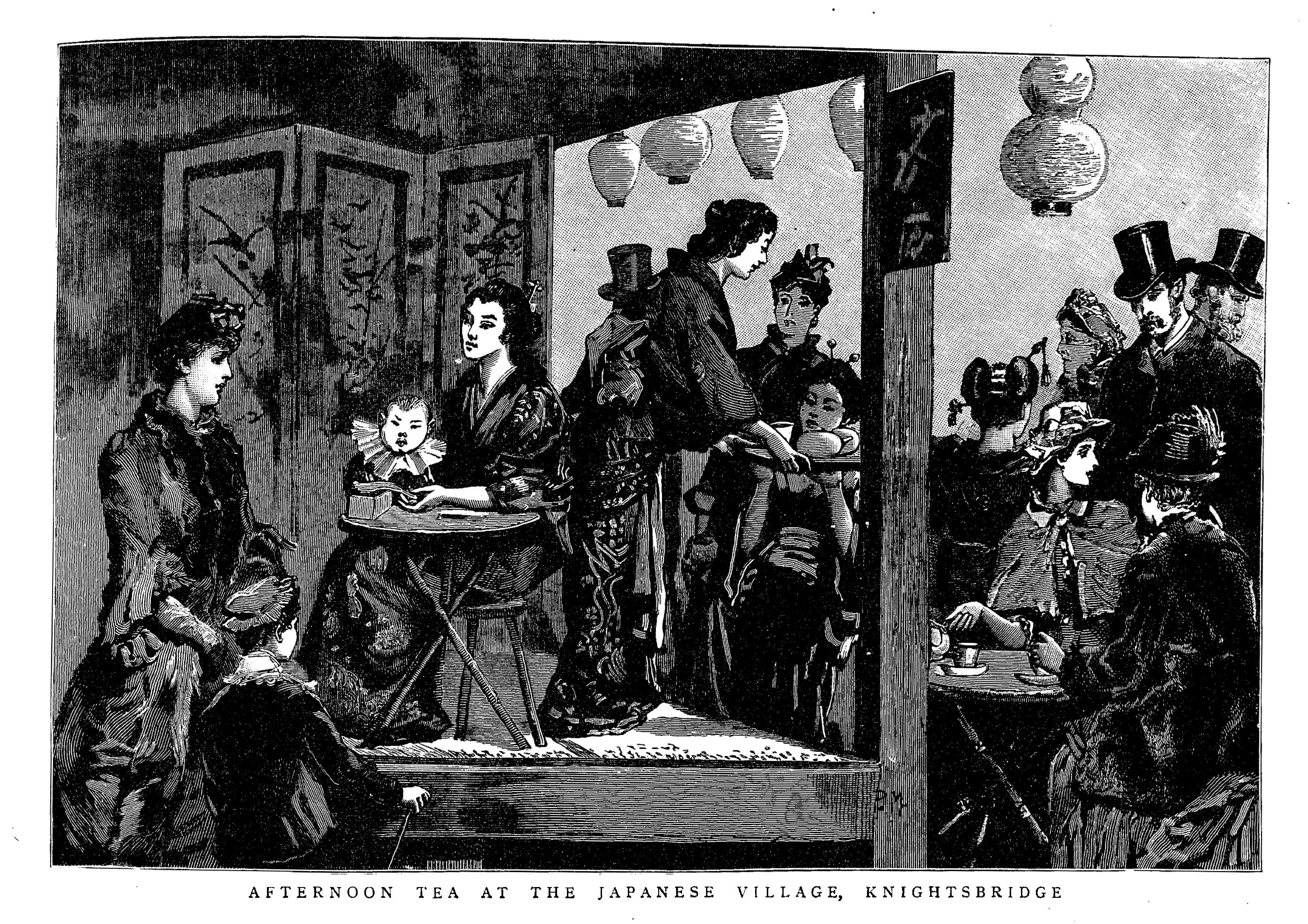
Teahouse at the Japanese Village, 1886

In December 1883 Buhicrosan and a number of associates set up The Japanese Native Village Exhibition and Trading Company Limited. Buhicrosan was to be managing director of the company and receive a salary of at least £1,000 (equivalent to about £100,000 in 2025). He visited Japan in 1884 in order to recruit workers for the enterprise. While there, he was interviewed by a Japanese newspaper and required an interpreter as he was not fluent in the language. About 100 Japanese craftsmen and entertainers were recruited to populate the Village and display their skills to visitors. Some brought wives and children with them. The Village was housed in Humphrey's Hall, an exhibition hall in Knightsbridge. It was laid out in the form of a Japanese village with houses and shops, as well as a temple, Japanese garden and tea-house, all constructed by the Japanese workers themselves. There was also accommodation for the workers in the hall. An advertising poster described the exhibition, to which entry cost one shilling:

The Japanese Village, erected and peopled exclusively by natives of Japan (males and females). Amongst whome are skilled artificers and workers who will illustrate the manners, customs, and art industries of their country, clad in their national and picturesque costumes. Magnificently decorated and illuminated Buddhist temple. Five o'clock tea in the Japanese Tea House. Japanese musical and other entertainments and every-day life as in Japan. A military band at intervals.

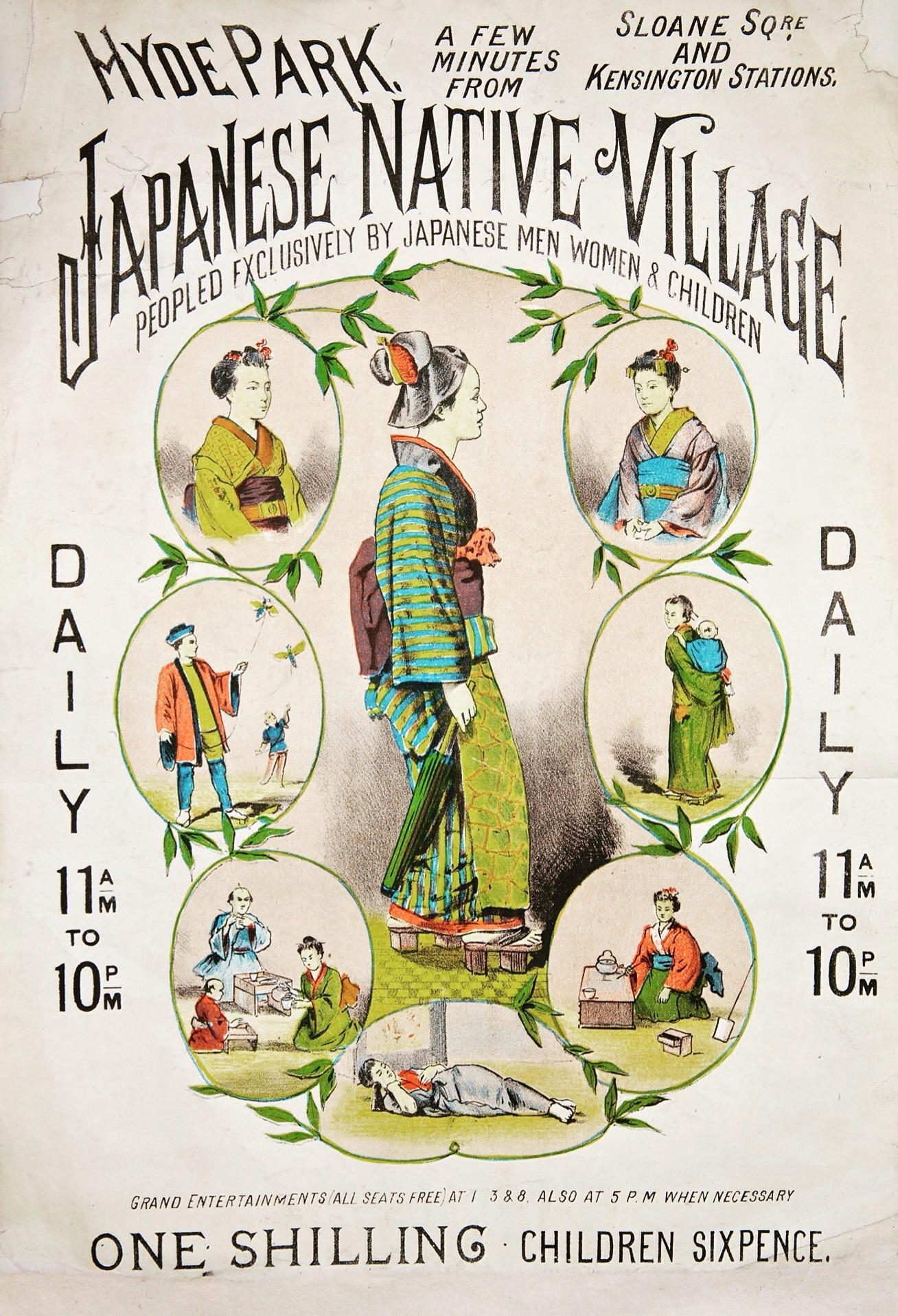

After a private viewing on 9 January 1885, the exhibition was officially opened by Sir Rutherford Alcock, former British Minister to Japan. The Japanese Village proved to be popular; by 1 May 1885, it had been visited by 250,000 people. Among the visitors was W. S. Gilbert and when the Gilbert and Sullivan comic opera, The Mikado, opened in March 1885, the programme acknowledged the help of the Village workers in coaching the cast in Japanese deportment. Fire broke out in Humphrey's Hall in the early hours of Saturday 2 May 1885 and the Village was destroyed. A Japanese wood carver was killed, but all the other workers who were sleeping on the premises managed to escape. While the Village was being rebuilt (with some changes to lessen the risk of fire), the exhibition went to Berlin and Munich in Germany. It re-opened in Humphrey's Hall on 2 December 1885. Visitor numbers decreased in 1887 and the company got into financial difficulties. It was taken over by another company, with which Buhicrosan had no connection, and was wound up in August 1888. Buhicrosan meanwhile took some of the Japanese workers and set up a smaller exhibition in Liverpool and then Brussels.

== Later years and death ==
In 1885, when the Japanese Village opened, Buhicrosan and his family had been living in a large house, Yeddo Grange, in Ladywell. In 1891 they moved back to the smaller house in Hither Green. Buhicrosan became bankrupt in 1892. He died at The Woodlands, Hither Green, on 10 August 1894 and was buried in Ladywell Cemetery. He was described on his death certificate as a "Japanese merchant" and his cause of death was given as cirrhosis of the liver. He did not leave a will. His estate was valued at £302 and went to his widow, Otakesan, who survived him by nearly twenty years. Sir Hugh Cortazzi, who devoted a chapter to Buhicrosan in his book about the Japanese Village, summed him up:

The impression we get of Tannaker is of a highly energetic, indeed seemingly tireless entrepreneur, a man who had some chameleon-like qualities, and who always had an eye for the 'main chance'; and who was willing to go to some lengths to protect and expand his business.
