= Elmer Robinson =

33rd Mayor of San Francisco from 1948 to 1956

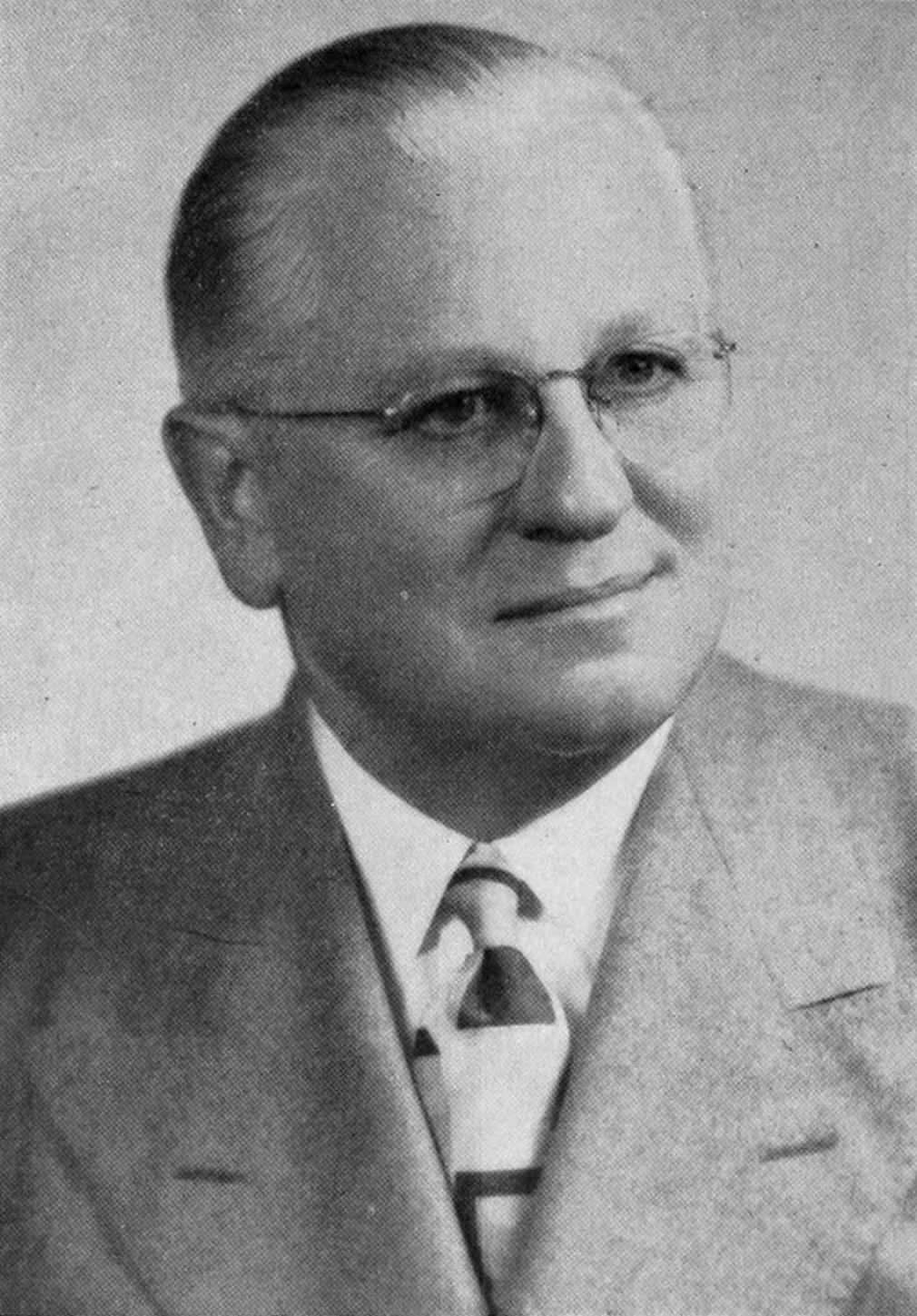
- Robinson c. 1948

33rd Mayor of San Francisco
- In office January 8, 1948 – January 8, 1956
- Preceded by: Roger Lapham
- Succeeded by: George Christopher

12th President of the United States Conference of Mayors
- In office 1953–1955
- Preceded by: Thomas A. Burke
- Succeeded by: John Hynes

Personal details
- Born: Elmer Edwin Robinson; October 3, 1894 San Francisco, California
- Died: June 7, 1982 (aged 87) Paradise, California
- Resting place: San Francisco
- Party: Republican

Elmer Edwin Robinson (October 3, 1894 – June 7, 1982) was the 33rd mayor of San Francisco, California. A Republican, he served as San Francisco's mayor from January 1948 until January 1956.

Robinson was born in the Richmond District of San Francisco, but primarily grew up in the northern California town of Fort Bragg. He moved back to San Francisco to attend night law school, after which he was admitted to the bar in 1915. He served as a deputy district attorney of San Francisco County, 1915 to 1921. He worked for 15 years, as a civil and criminal attorney in private practice.

In 1933, President Roosevelt appointed Robinson to direct adjustment of claims of World War I veterans, at the request of the Disabled American Veterans. In January 1935, he became a Municipal Court judge, and that October a Superior Court judge. He was elected to two six-year terms on the San Francisco County Superior bench, 1936 and 1942. During World War II, he was the California State Chairman of a national salvage committee.

Robinson was elected mayor of San Francisco in November 1947, taking office the following January, and reelected for another four years in 1951. He promoted and oversaw numerous development projects, including an expansion of San Francisco International Airport and the construction of new schools, libraries, police stations, parking garages, and the modernization of the San Francisco Municipal Railway. San Francisco, although relatively prosperous in the boom years after World War II, experienced some population loss to outlying suburban areas during Robinson's terms in office. By 1955, the city had a budget of over $200 million.

From 1953 through 1955, Robinson served as president of the United States Conference of Mayors.

Robinson returned to his law practice and served as president and general manager of Woodlawn Memorial Park while living in San Francisco. He died of a heart attack at Feather River Hospital in Paradise, California, on June 7, 1982, aged 87.

Political offices
Preceded by Roger Lapham	Mayor of San Francisco; 1948–1956	Succeeded by George Christopher
