= Edward Robeson Taylor =

28th Mayor of San Francisco from 1907 to 1910

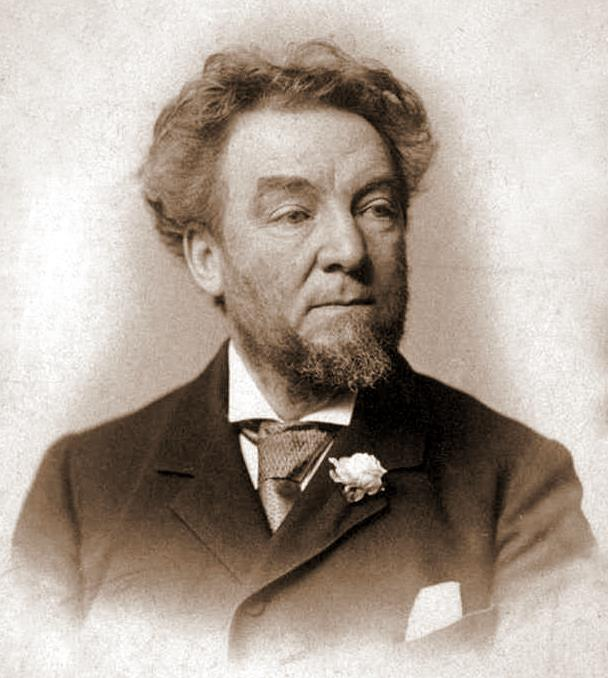
- Portrait by I. W. Taber, 1894

28th Mayor of San Francisco
- In office July 16, 1907 – January 8, 1910
- Preceded by: Charles Boxton
- Succeeded by: P. H. McCarthy

Personal details
- Born: September 22, 1838 Springfield, Illinois, U.S.
- Died: July 5, 1923 (aged 84) San Francisco, California, U.S.
- Party: Democratic
- Profession: Lawyer, doctor, poet

Edward Robeson Taylor (September 24, 1838 – July 5, 1923) was the 28th Mayor of San Francisco, serving from July 16, 1907, to January 7, 1910.

== Early life ==
Edward Robeson Taylor was born on September 24, 1838, in Springfield, Illinois, the only son of Henry West Taylor and the former Mary Thaw of Philadelphia, Pennsylvania (he was descended on his mother's side from the early colonial merchant, Andrew Robeson, of Philadelphia). He eventually moved to California to escape the Civil War.

Taylor was a lawyer, a doctor, and a poet. He served as dean of Hastings College of the Law, co-founded a medical college, and founded the Book Club of California. He also served as private secretary to governor Henry Huntly Haight, and the two men later became law partners.

In 1898, he published a book of sonnets based on the paintings of William Keith.

== Mayor of San Francisco ==
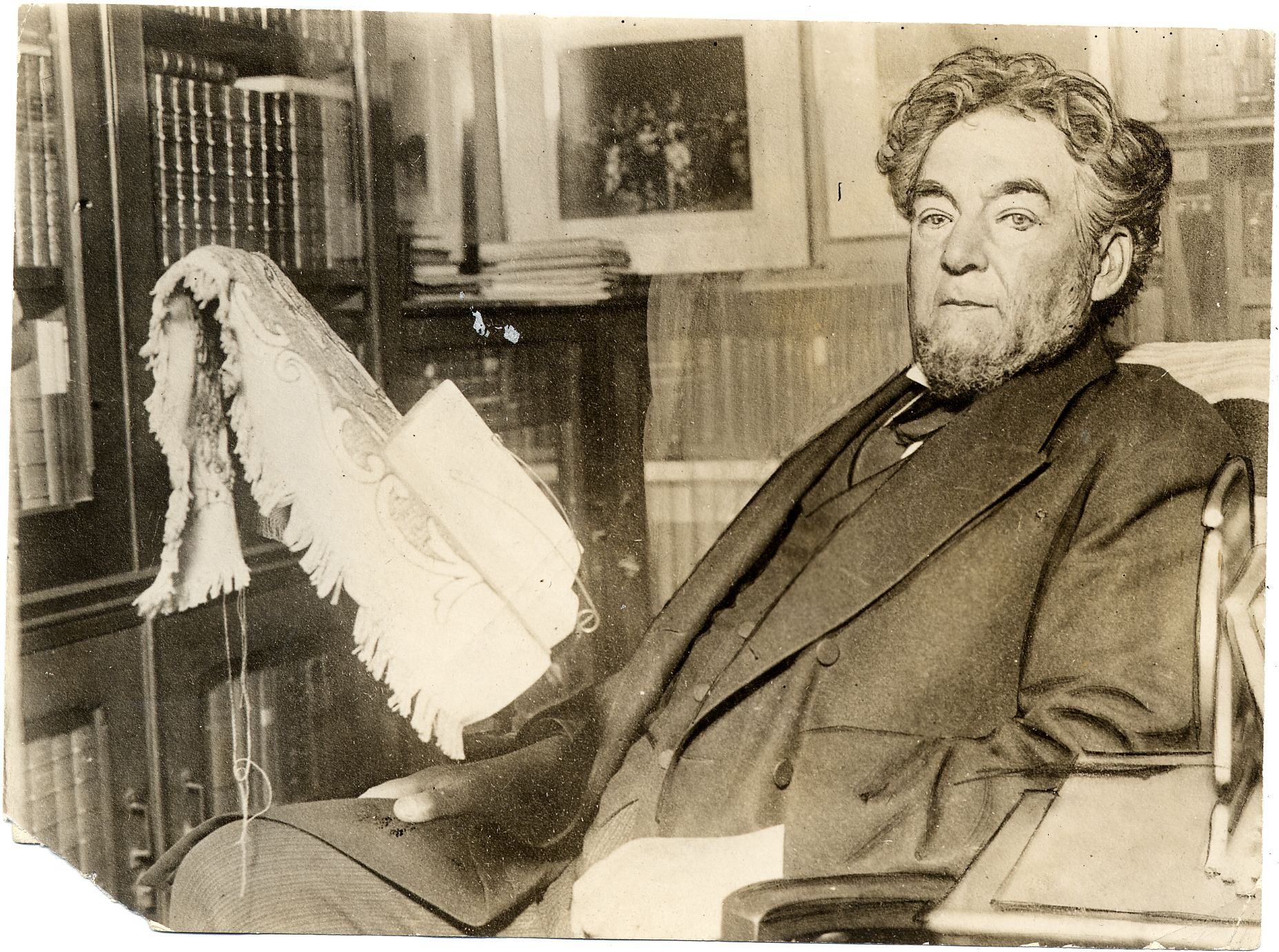
Taylor shortly after being sworn in as mayor, July 24, 1907

On July 16, 1907, Taylor was appointed mayor following the resignation of Charles Boxton, who served only eight days after the conviction and removal of Eugene Schmitz. (Taylor was actually the third man approached for the city's top job, as Dr. John Galloway and former Justice Ralph C. Harrison both declined.) At 68 years of age, he became the city's oldest mayor (a record he still holds as of 2025). Taylor was elected to a full two-year term that fall, defeating three other candidates (including future mayor P. H. McCarthy) with just over half the vote. He declined to run again in 1909, and would be the last member of the Democratic Party to lead San Francisco for over half a century (until John F. Shelley was elected in 1963).

During his 30 months as mayor, Taylor's accomplishments included: presiding over the resolution of the bloody 1907 San Francisco streetcar strike; reorganizing the city government after 16 of 18 members of the board of supervisors and the chief of the police department were implicated in a corruption scandal; rebuilding the city in the aftermath of the devastating 1906 earthquake; battling with the federal government for the right to build the Hetch Hetchy water system; presiding over the creation of the Municipal Railway; and fighting an outbreak of bubonic plague.

== Legacy ==
Edward Robeson Taylor died in San Francisco on July 5, 1923. His remains are housed at the San Francisco Columbarium. The political economist Henry George credits Taylor for influencing his work Progress and Poverty (1879), one of the most popular and influential books in American history. In September 1925, the name of Portola Elementary School in San Francisco was changed to Edward Robeson Taylor Elementary School to honor him. As of 1926, Taylor was distinguished as one of only two politicians in California state history to be both a medical doctor and an attorney-at-law, the other being William J. Gavigan.

== Notes ==
Preceded by Charles Boxton	Mayor of San Francisco; 1907–1910	Succeeded by P.H. McCarthy
