= Charles Boxton =

27th Mayor of San Francisco during 1907

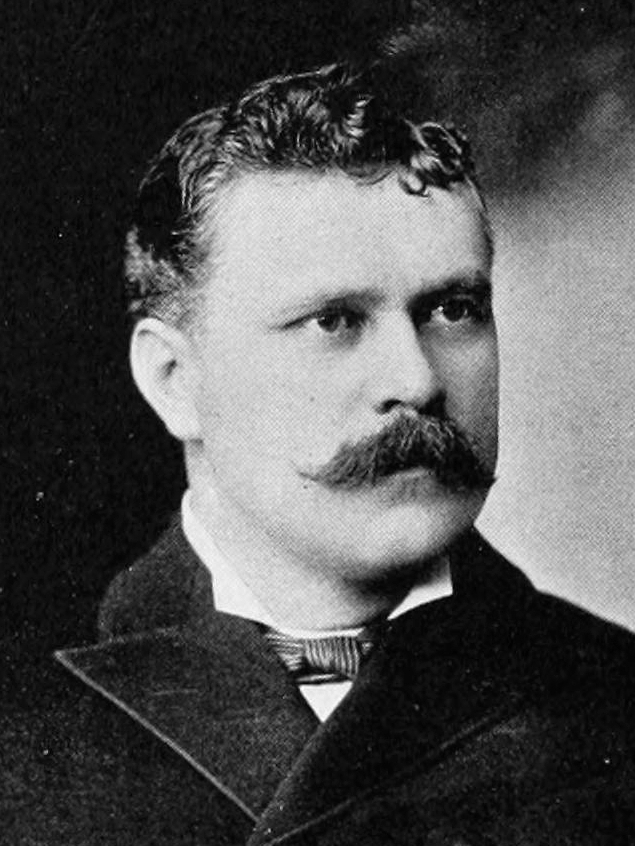
- Boxton c. 1900

27th Mayor of San Francisco
- In office July 9, 1907 – July 16, 1907
- Preceded by: Eugene Schmitz
- Succeeded by: Edward Robeson Taylor

Member of the San Francisco Board of Supervisors
- In office January 8, 1900 – July 9, 1907
- Preceded by: At-large districts established
- Succeeded by: James P. Booth

Personal details
- Born: April 24, 1860 Shasta County, California, U.S.
- Died: August 29, 1927 (aged 67) Redwood City, California, U.S.
- Party: Republican; Union Labor
- Spouse: Annie Huber (m. 1884)
- Profession: Dentist, military officer, politician

Military service
- Allegiance: United States
- Branch/service: California National Guard
- Years of service: 1884–1899
- Rank: Lieutenant Colonel
- Unit: 1st California Regiment
- Battles/wars: Philippine–American War

Charles Boxton (April 24, 1860 – August 29, 1927) was an American dentist, military officer and politician who served as the 27th mayor of San Francisco for seven days, from July 9 to July 16, 1907.

== Early life and career ==
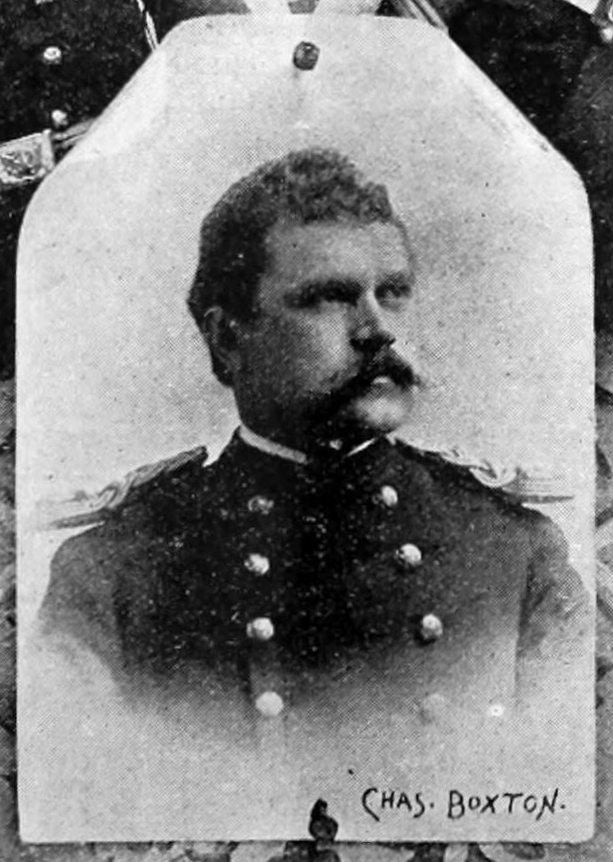
Captain Boxton in uniform c. 1892

Boxton was born in Shasta County, California on April 24, 1860. He attended the public schools of San Francisco and then entered a dental apprenticeship. Afterwards he entered the University of California, where he earned a D.D.S. degree, and then entered private practice in San Francisco. He enlisted in the California National Guard in 1884, rising to the rank of captain by 1892.

Boxton soon left his dental practice to fight in the Philippine–American War, serving as a major in the 1st California Regiment. He ended his service as a lieutenant colonel. After returning home, he entered politics and was elected to the San Francisco Board of Supervisors as a Republican in 1899. He also became dean of the Dental Department at San Francisco's College of Physicians and Surgeons.

== Mayor of San Francisco ==
After the conviction of mayor Eugene Schmitz on bribery charges in July 1907, Boxton was selected by Board of Supervisors to serve as mayor temporarily until a new mayor could be elected at a convention later that same month.

One day after his election as mayor, Boxton was called as the first witness in the trial of Louis Glass, an executive with the Pacific States Telephone and Telegraph Company, from whom Boxton and 10 other supervisors had admitted taking bribes of $5,000 each. Boxton spent much of his week as a mayor shuttling between court and his official duties, and admitted – in addition to the bribery – to having lied under oath, signing a false affidavit in 1906.

Boxton's tenure as mayor was marked by the additional confusion of former mayor Schmitz refusing to concede he had vacated the office, despite having been convicted and imprisoned for bribery. Insisting he would be exonerated upon appeal and reelected, Schmitz's supporters blockaded the mayor's office, forcing Boxton to relocate his offices.

The convention called to replace Boxton quickly fell apart amid conflicts between business and labor interests. Subsequently, a trio of prosecutors involved in the Schmitz bribery case – including District Attorney William H. Langdon – selected the next mayor, Edward Robeson Taylor, a respected lawyer and physician then serving as dean of the Hastings College of Law. Boxton subsequently resigned as mayor on July 16, allowing the Board of Supervisors to elect Taylor before resigning en masse themselves, thus allowing Taylor to appoint new supervisors.

== Later life ==
A month after his resignation as mayor in 1907, Boxton was removed as Dean of Dental Department of the College of Physicians and Surgeons. Boxton would later return to the school's board of trustees in 1913 and was reappointed Dean in 1915. The College of Physicians and Surgeons would later be absorbed by the University of the Pacific in 1962, and is today known as the Arthur A. Dugoni School of Dentistry.

Boxton died August 29, 1927, in Redwood City.
