= 1919 San Francisco mayoral election =

- November 4, 1919
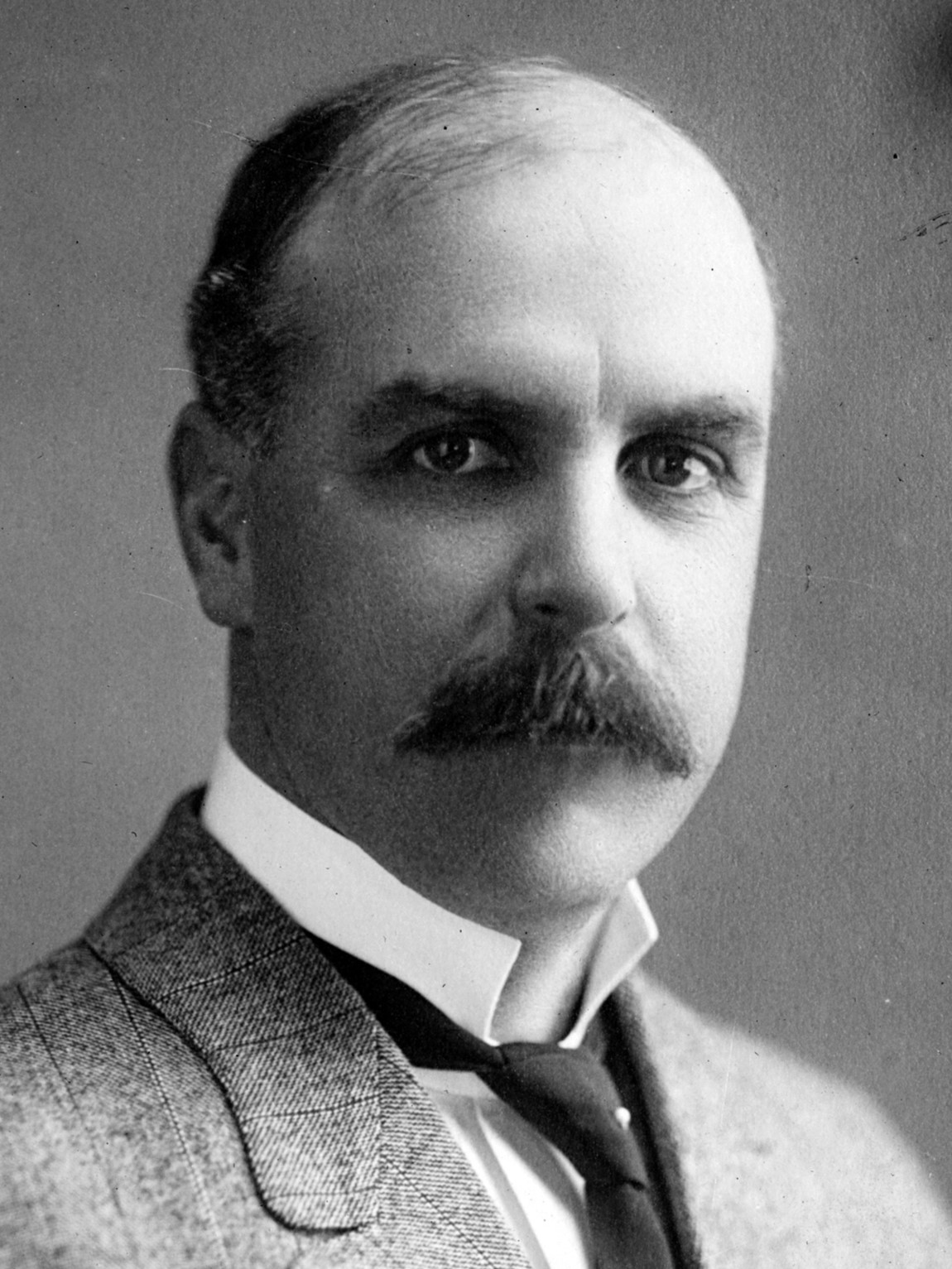

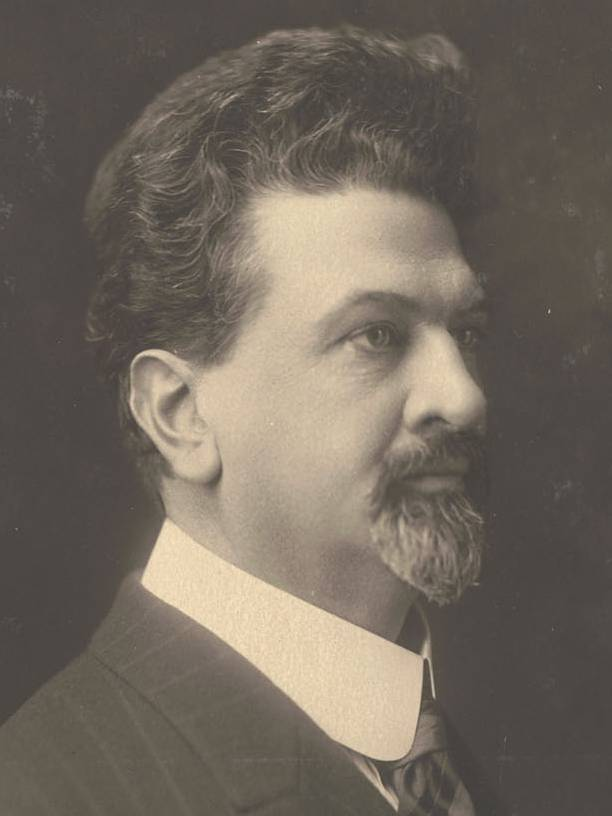
Candidate	James Rolph Jr.	Eugene Schmitz
Party	Republican	Nonpartisan
Alliance	Union Labor
Popular vote	61,760	34,173
Percentage	64.38%	35.62%
Mayor before election
James Rolph Jr.
Republican
Elected Mayor
James Rolph Jr.
Republican

The 1919 San Francisco mayoral election was held on November 4, 1919. Incumbent James Rolph Jr. was re-elected with 64% of the vote.

== Results ==
1919 San Francisco mayoral election
Party	Candidate	Votes	%
Republican	James Rolph Jr.	61,760	64.38%
Nonpartisan	Eugene Schmitz	34,173	35.62%
Total votes		95,933	100.00
Republican hold			
