= William J. Gavigan =

American politician (1859–1925)

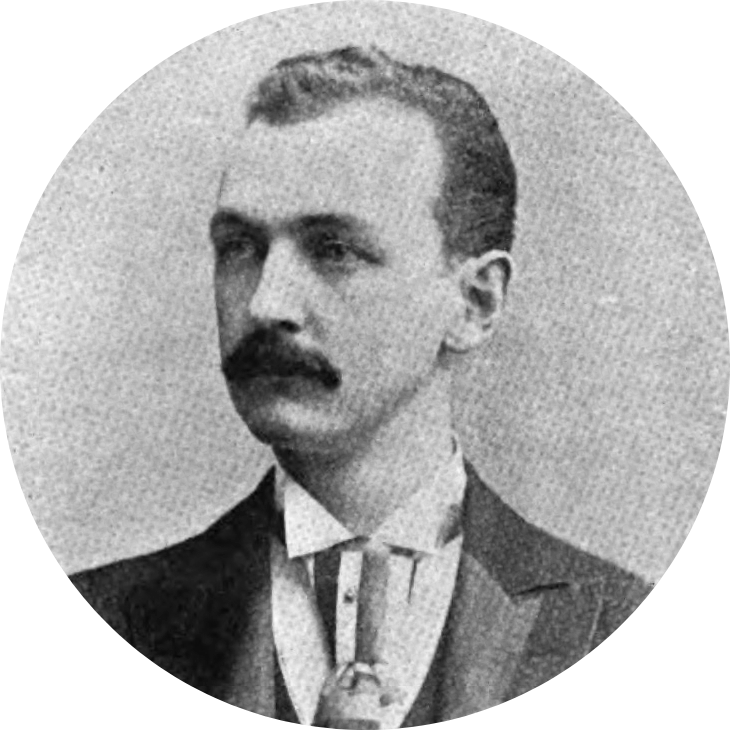
- Gavigan c. 1892

Member of the California State Assembly from the 12th district
- In office January 3, 1881 – January 8, 1883
- Preceded by: Multi-member district
- Succeeded by: Multi-member district

Personal details
- Born: September 17, 1859 San Francisco, California, U.S.
- Died: February 18, 1925 (aged 65) Merano, Kingdom of Italy
- Party: Workingmen's (before 1881); Democratic (after 1881)
- Education: Cooper Medical College
- Occupation: Printer, attorney, physician, politician

William Jamison Gavigan (September 17, 1859 – February 18, 1925) was an American printer, attorney, physician and politician who served in the California State Assembly from 1881 to 1883. He was elected on a Workingmen's-Democratic Fusion ticket at just 21 years, one month and 15 days old, making him the youngest person ever elected to the California State Legislature. As of 1926, Gavigan was distinguished as one of only two politicians in California state history to be both a medical doctor and an attorney-at-law, the other being Edward Robeson Taylor.

== Works ==
- "Applying Prof. Loeb's Discovery That Electricity Is Foundation of Life". Sunday Examiner. Vol. LXXVI, no. 117. San Francisco. April 27, 1902. p. 39.

== Sources ==
- "HANCOCK'S SUPPORTERS". The Daily Examiner. San Francisco. July 17, 1880.
- "THE POLITICAL FIELD". The Morning Call. San Francisco. July 12, 1881.
- "PERSONAL". The Morning Call. San Francisco. June 11, 1882.
