= 1915 San Francisco mayoral election =

- September 28, 1915
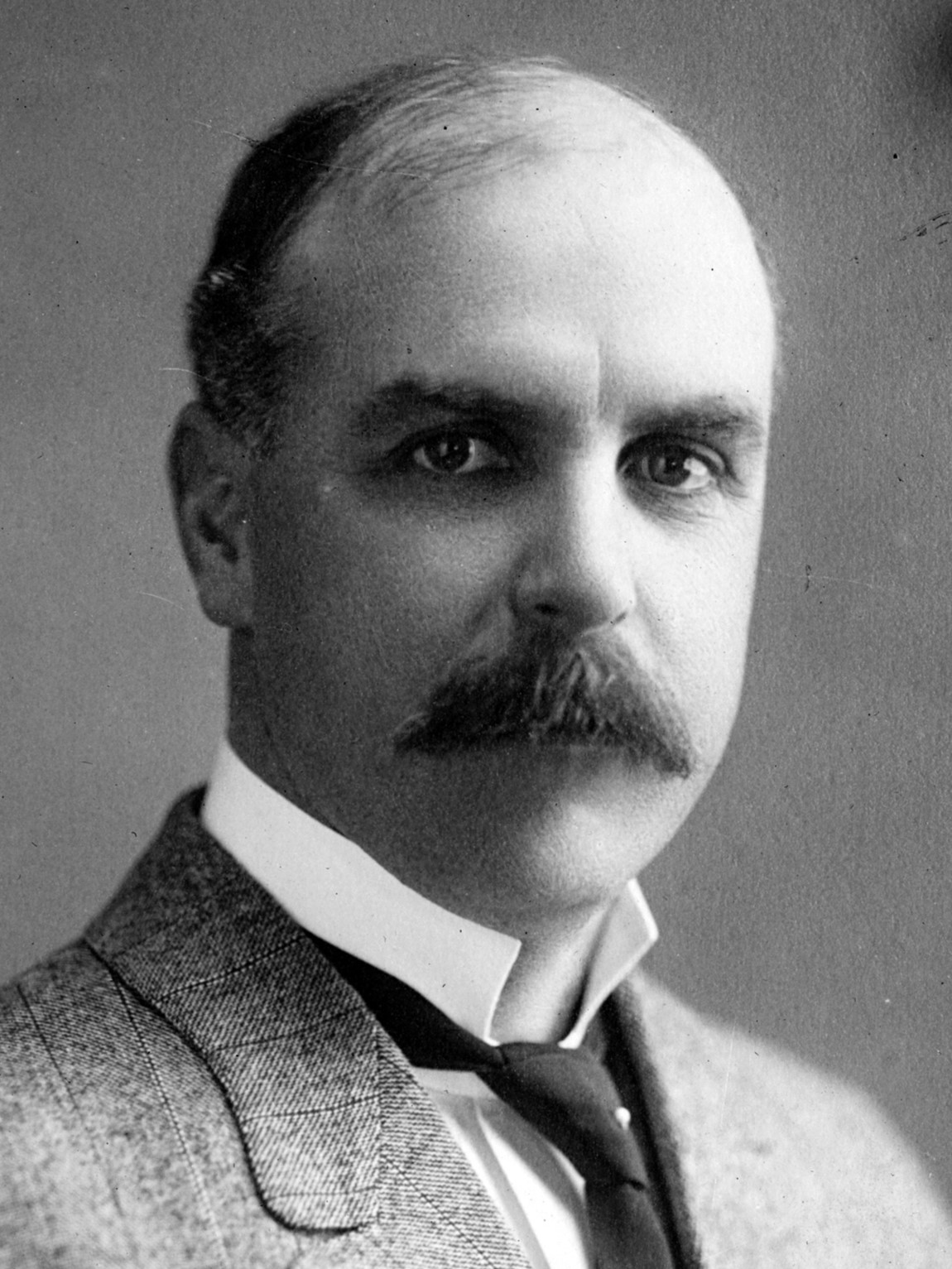

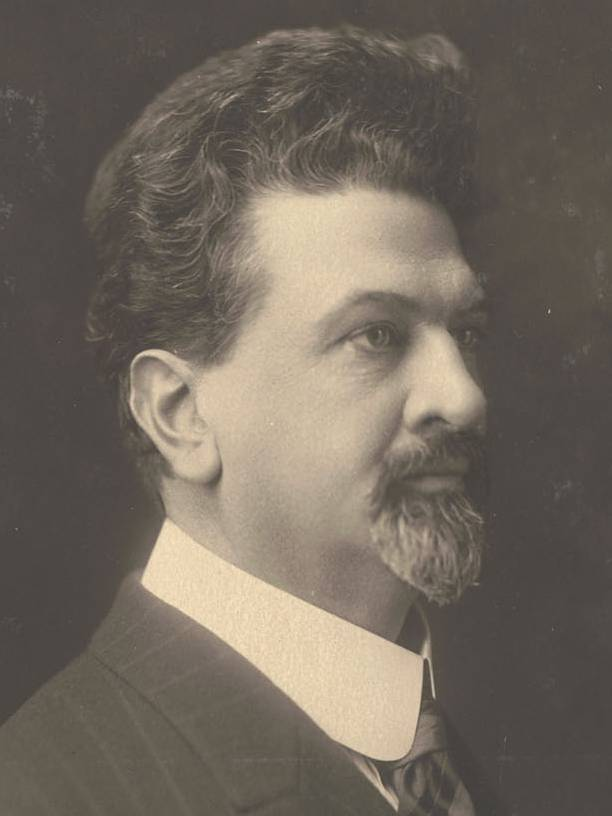

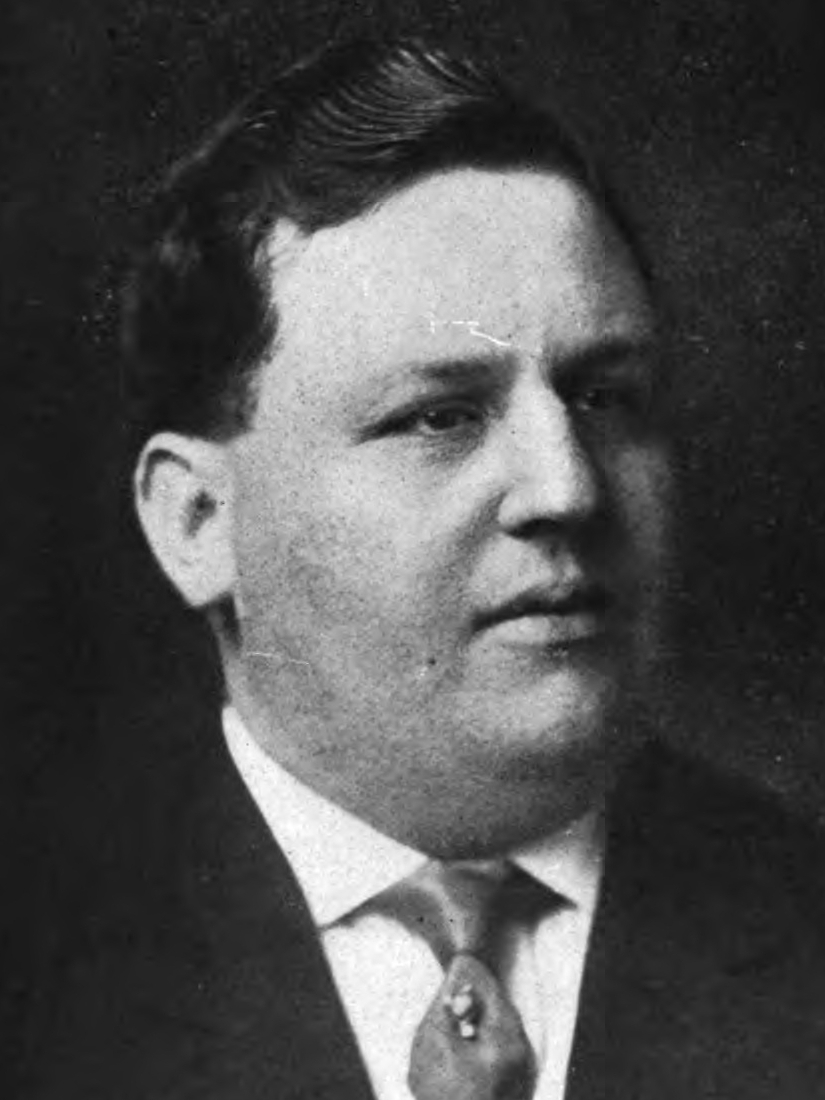
Candidate	James Rolph Jr.	Eugene Schmitz	Andrew J. Gallagher
Party	Republican	Nonpartisan	Union Labor
Popular vote	63,814	36,006	15,924
Percentage	53.86%	30.39%	13.44%
Mayor before election
James Rolph Jr.
Republican
Elected Mayor
James Rolph Jr.
Republican

The 1915 San Francisco mayoral election was held on September 28, 1915. Incumbent James Rolph Jr. was re-elected with 53% of the vote.

== Results ==
1915 San Francisco mayoral election
Party	Candidate	Votes	%
Republican	James Rolph Jr.	63,814	53.86%
Nonpartisan	Eugene Schmitz	36,006	30.39%
Union Labor	Andrew J. Gallagher	15,924	13.44%
Socialist	Gideon S. Brower	1,931	1.63%
Nonpartisan	Frederick Head	333	0.28%
Nonpartisan	William T. Valentine	200	0.17%
Nonpartisan	Frank Carroll	182	0.15%
Total votes		118,390	100.00
Republican hold			
