= Eugene Schmitz =

26th Mayor of San Francisco from 1902 to 1907

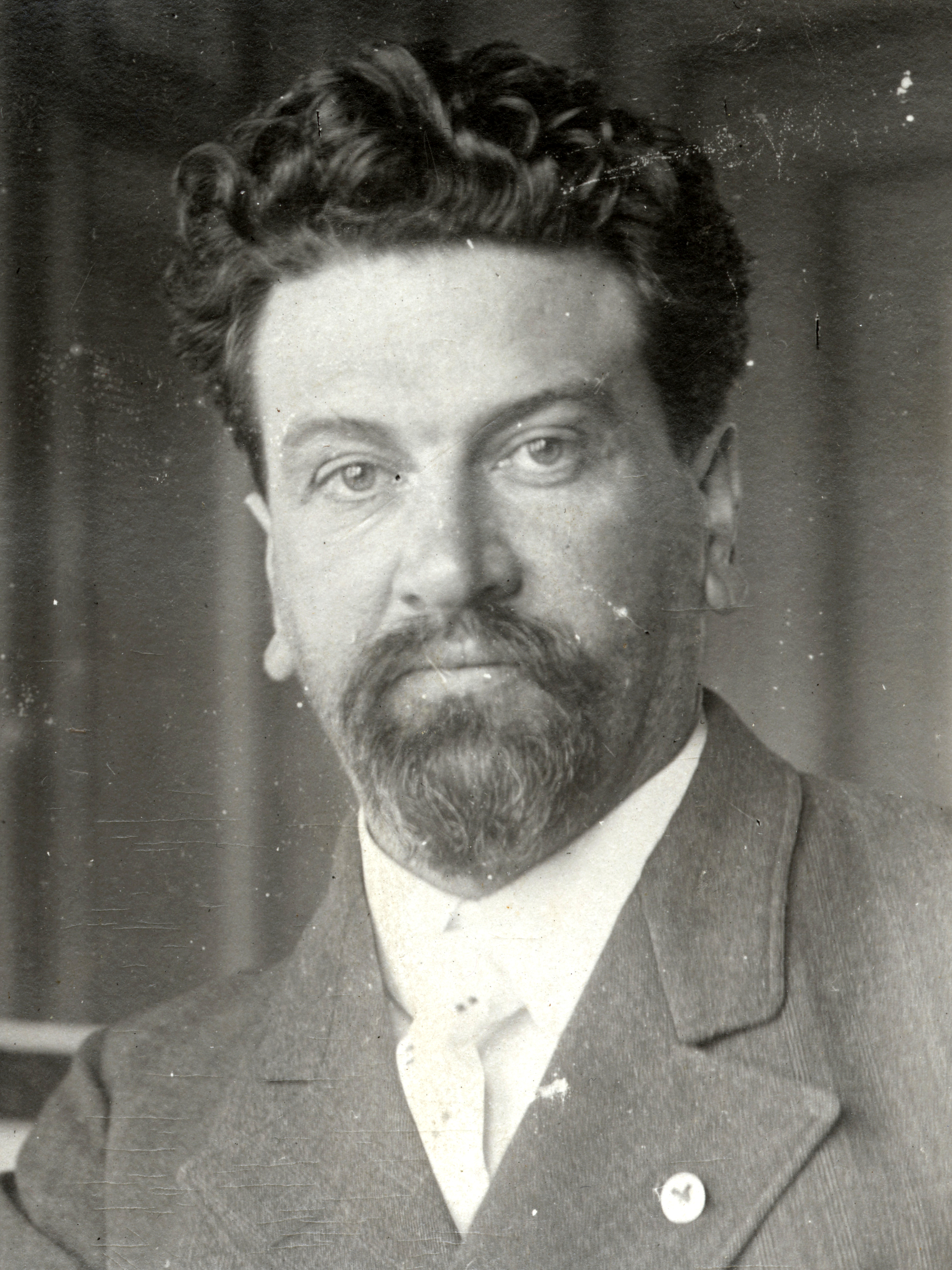
- Schmitz c. 1906

26th Mayor of San Francisco
- In office January 8, 1902 – July 8, 1907
- Preceded by: James D. Phelan
- Succeeded by: Charles Boxton

Member of the San Francisco Board of Supervisors
- In office January 8, 1918 – January 4, 1926
- Preceded by: Edward L. Nolan
- Succeeded by: Charles F. Todd

Personal details
- Born: August 22, 1864 San Francisco, California, U.S.
- Died: November 20, 1928 (aged 64) San Francisco, California, U.S.
- Party: Republican (before 1901); Union Labor (after 1901)
- Spouse: Julia Driscoll (m. 1891)
- Children: Eugenia; Evelyn; Richard
- Profession: Musician, labor leader, politician

Eugene Edward Schmitz (August 22, 1864 – November 20, 1928), nicknamed "Handsome Gene", was an American musician, conductor, musical director, labor leader and politician who served as the 26th mayor of San Francisco from 1902 to 1907. His administration is remembered for its response to the 1906 San Francisco earthquake and its downfall during the San Francisco graft trials.

== Early life ==
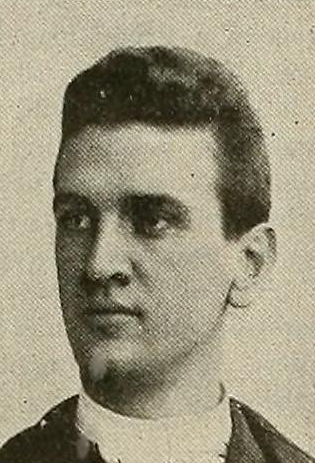
Schmitz c. 1894

Schmitz was born in San Francisco, California on August 22, 1864, the son of an Irish mother and a German father. He attended the city's public grammar schools and began his musical education at 14, learning the drums, piano and violin from his father Joseph and his uncle Christopher, both of whom were professional musicians. He was appointed conductor of the California Theatre orchestra in 1894 and the Columbia Theatre orchestra in 1895.

== Political career ==
Active in the labor movement since 1886, Schmitz was serving as president of the Musicians' Union when city boss Abe Ruef chose him to run for mayor of his hometown on the ticket of the Union Labor Party. Schmitz was elected on November 5, 1901, thereafter giving protection to criminals, including houses of prostitution for protection money, while remaining popular with the working class.

Schmitz speaks at a Grand Army of the Republic Fourth of July celebration, 1904

Schmitz was reelected in 1903 and 1905, each time by wide margins. In 1905, despite opposition from a reform candidate backed by a fusion ticket, Schmitz won by an outright majority, receiving 40,191 votes, whereas only 28,687 were cast for his opponent, John S. Partridge. In 1903, Schmitz received the votes of the state legislature's Union Labor minority in the Senate election.

=== 1906 earthquake ===
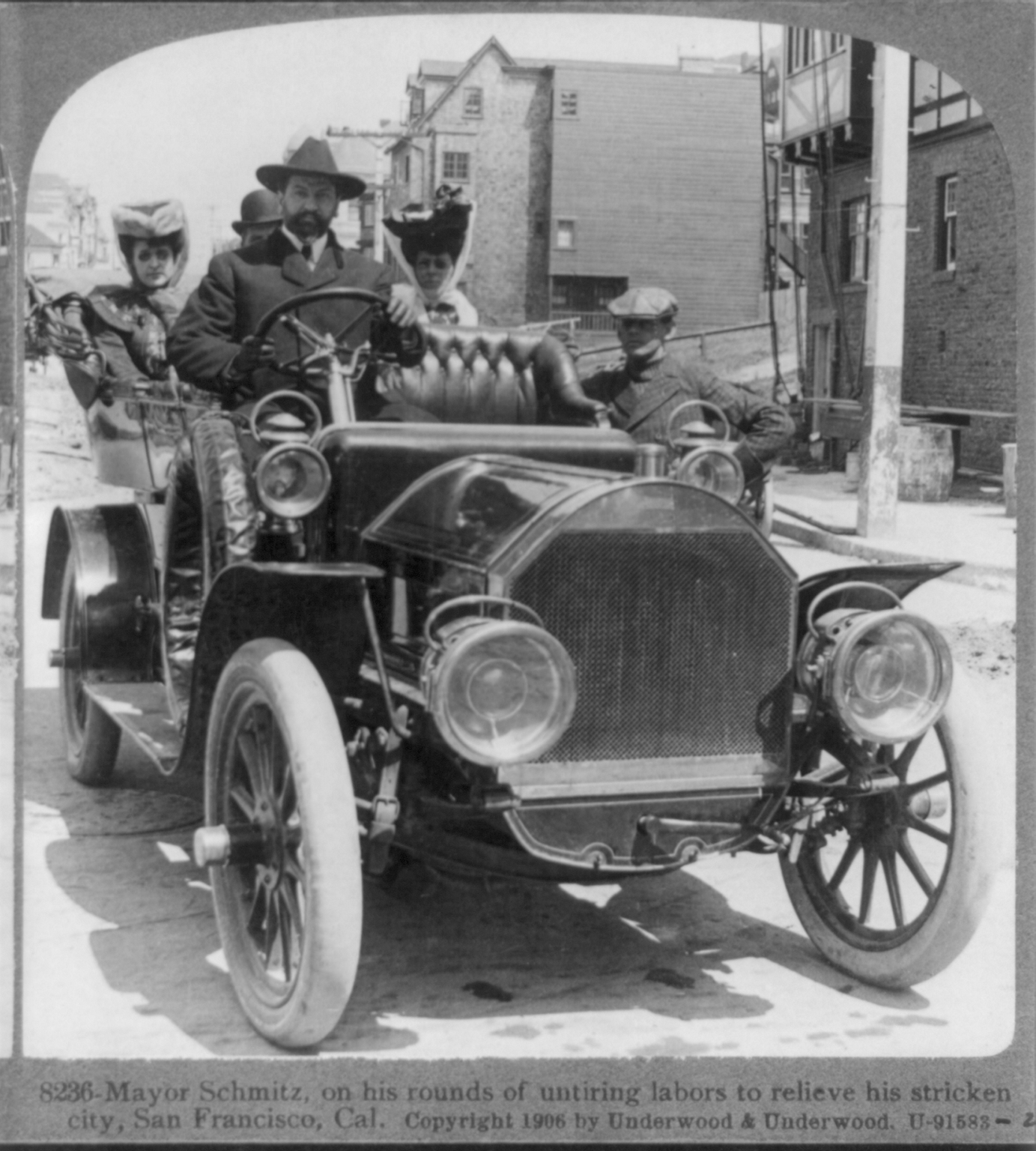
Schmitz surveys the city following the earthquake

Schmitz was still mayor when the 1906 San Francisco earthquake and subsequent fire destroyed a prodigious amount of the city. On the day of the earthquake, Wednesday, April 18, 1906, he invited a cross-section of the city's most prominent businessmen, politicians and civic leaders, but none of the members of the Board of Supervisors, to form the Committee of Fifty to help him manage the crisis.

Mayor Schmitz said "The federal troops, which are now policing a portion of the city, as well as the regular and special members of the police force, have been authorized by me to kill any persons whomsoever, found engaged in looting the effects of any citizen or otherwise engaged in the commission of crime."

=== Bribery scandal ===
On June 13, 1907, Schmitz was found guilty of extortion and bribery. The bribery scandal was one of the many San Francisco graft trials, which included Schmitz, Tirey L. Ford, and attorney Abe Ruef, who were receiving bribes. The office of mayor was declared vacant while he was sent to jail to await sentence. Shortly thereafter, he was sentenced to five years at San Quentin State Prison, the maximum sentence the law allowed. He immediately appealed; while awaiting the outcome, he was kept in a cell in San Francisco County Jail.

On January 9, 1908, the District Court of Appeals nullified his conviction. Two months later, the California Supreme Court upheld the Court of Appeals' ruling, and he was released on bail pending the resolution of the outstanding bribery indictments. In 1912, he was brought to trial once more, this time on charges of bribery; however, after Abe Ruef was brought from San Quentin to testify and refused to give evidence, and the other key witness, Chief Supervisor James L. Gallagher, fled to Canada, Schmitz was acquitted.

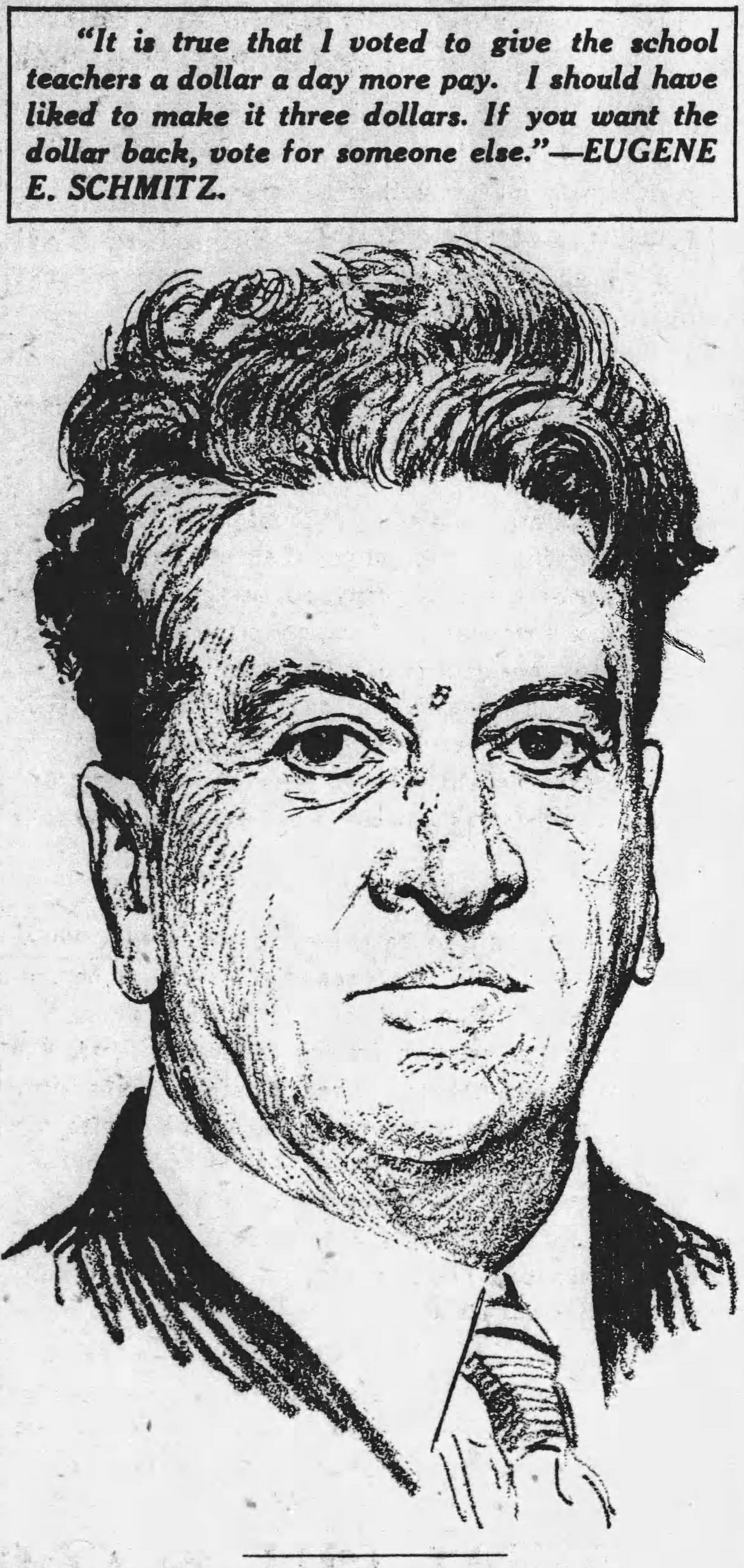
Portrait of Schmitz in the San Francisco Bulletin, 1925

Schmitz ran for mayor again in 1915 and 1919, but was soundly defeated due to his past reputation. He did achieve election to the Board of Supervisors in 1917, serving until 1926.

== Personal life and death ==
He married Julia Driscoll on June 10, 1891 in Watsonville, California and had two daughters. He died in San Francisco on November 20, 1928.

== Caricature gallery ==
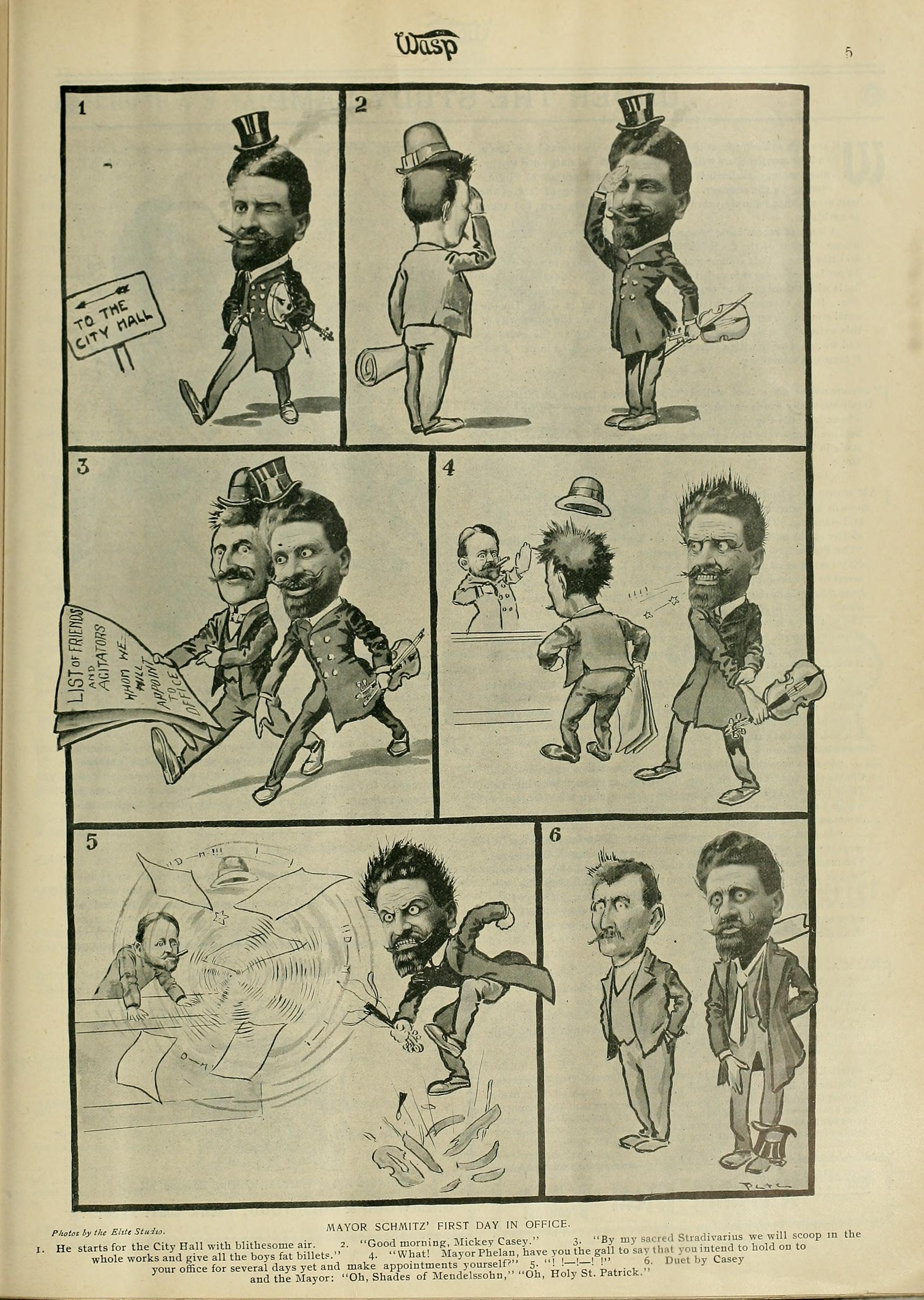
"Mayor Schmitz' First Day in Office"

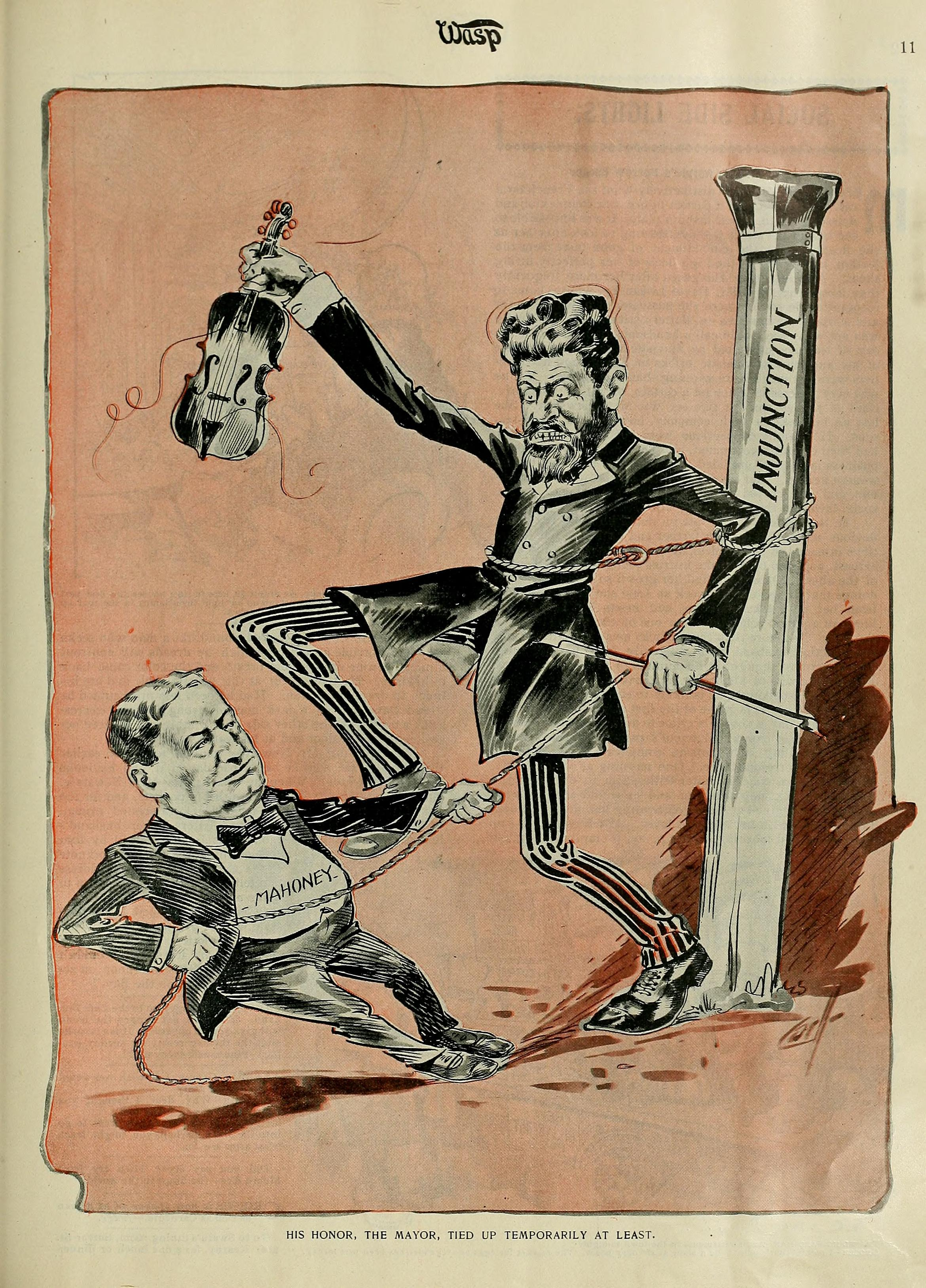
"His Honor, the Mayor, Tied Up Temporarily at Least"

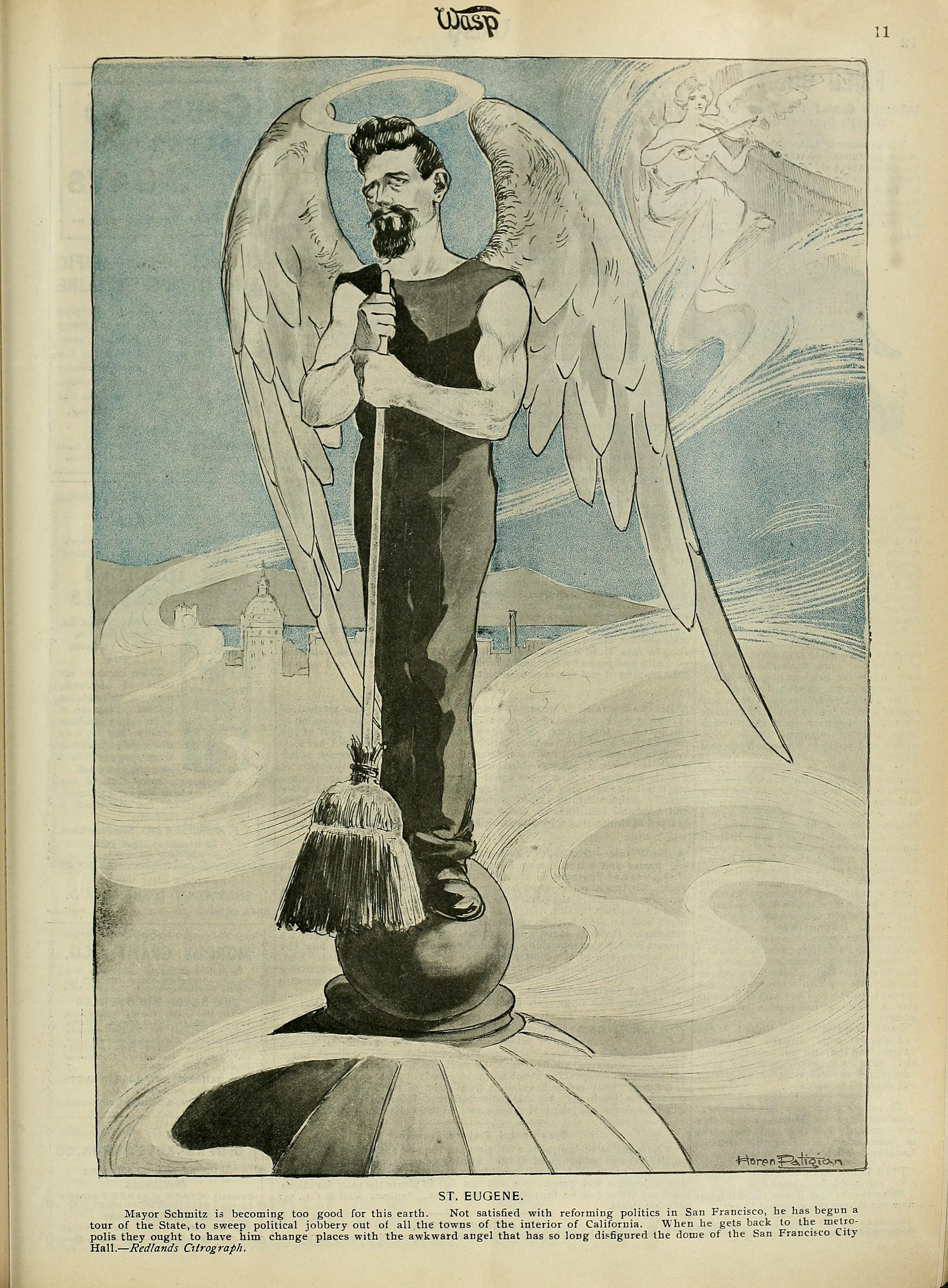
"St. Eugene"

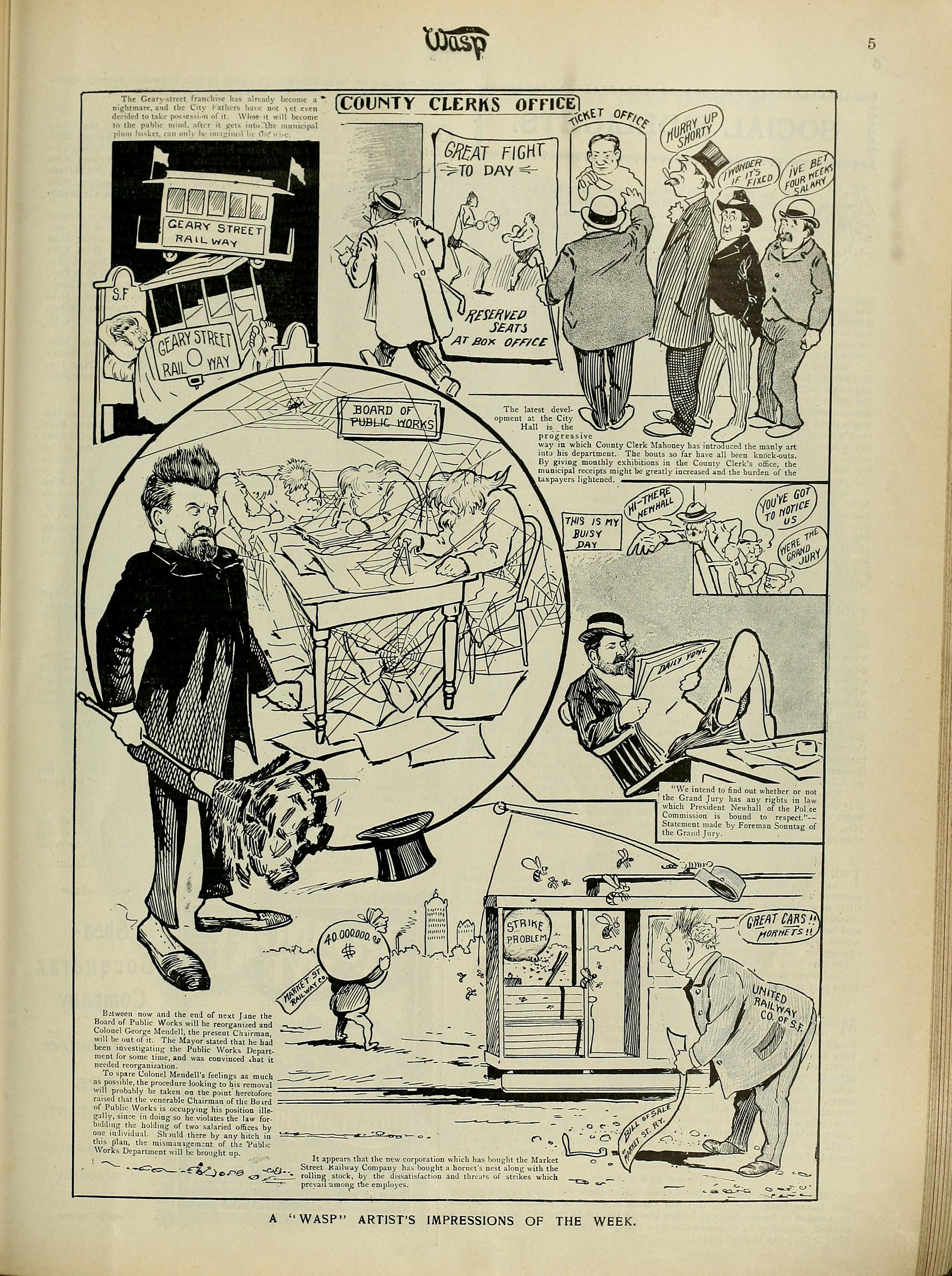
"A 'Wasp' Artist's Impressions of the Week"

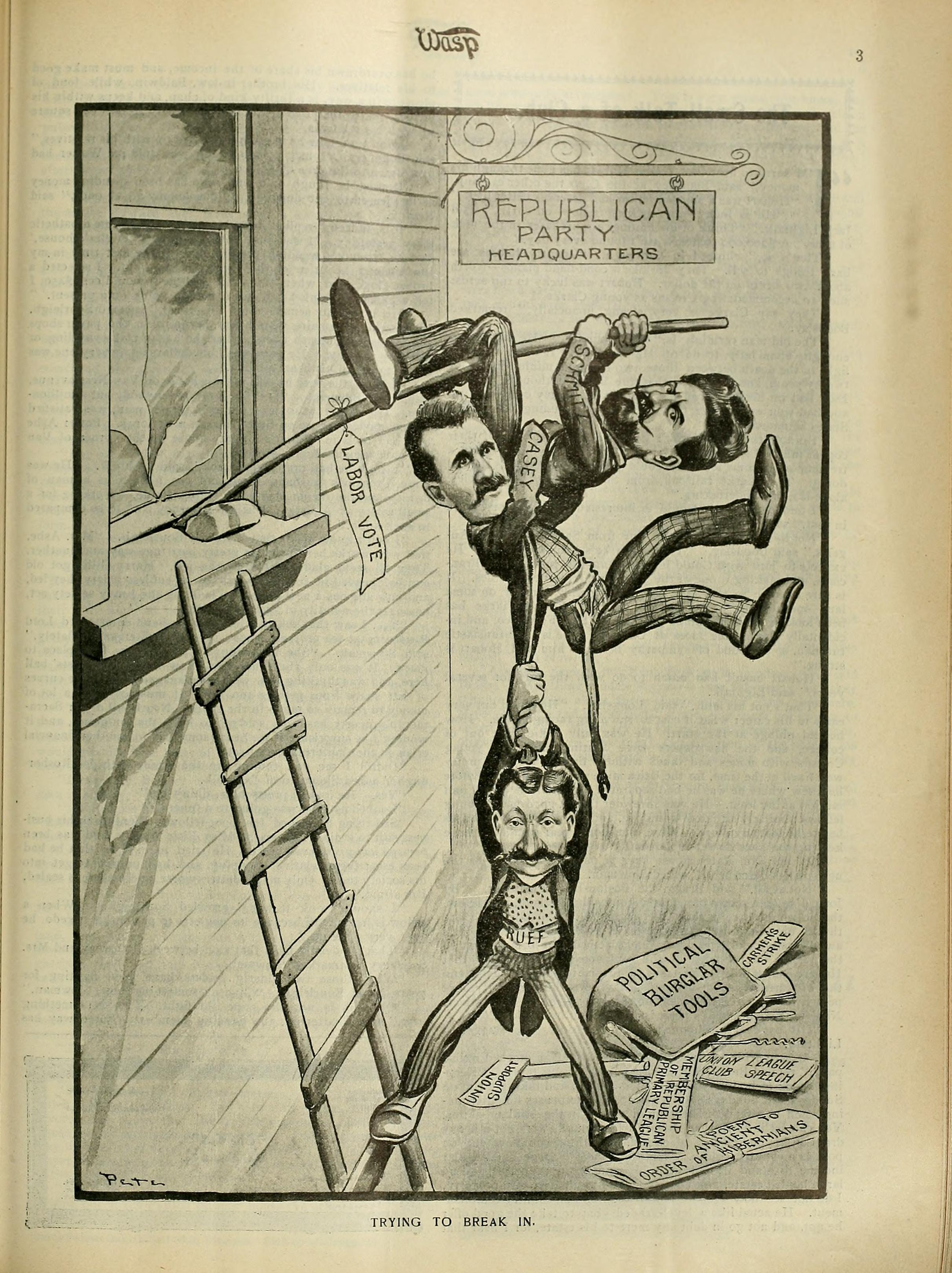
"Trying to Break in"

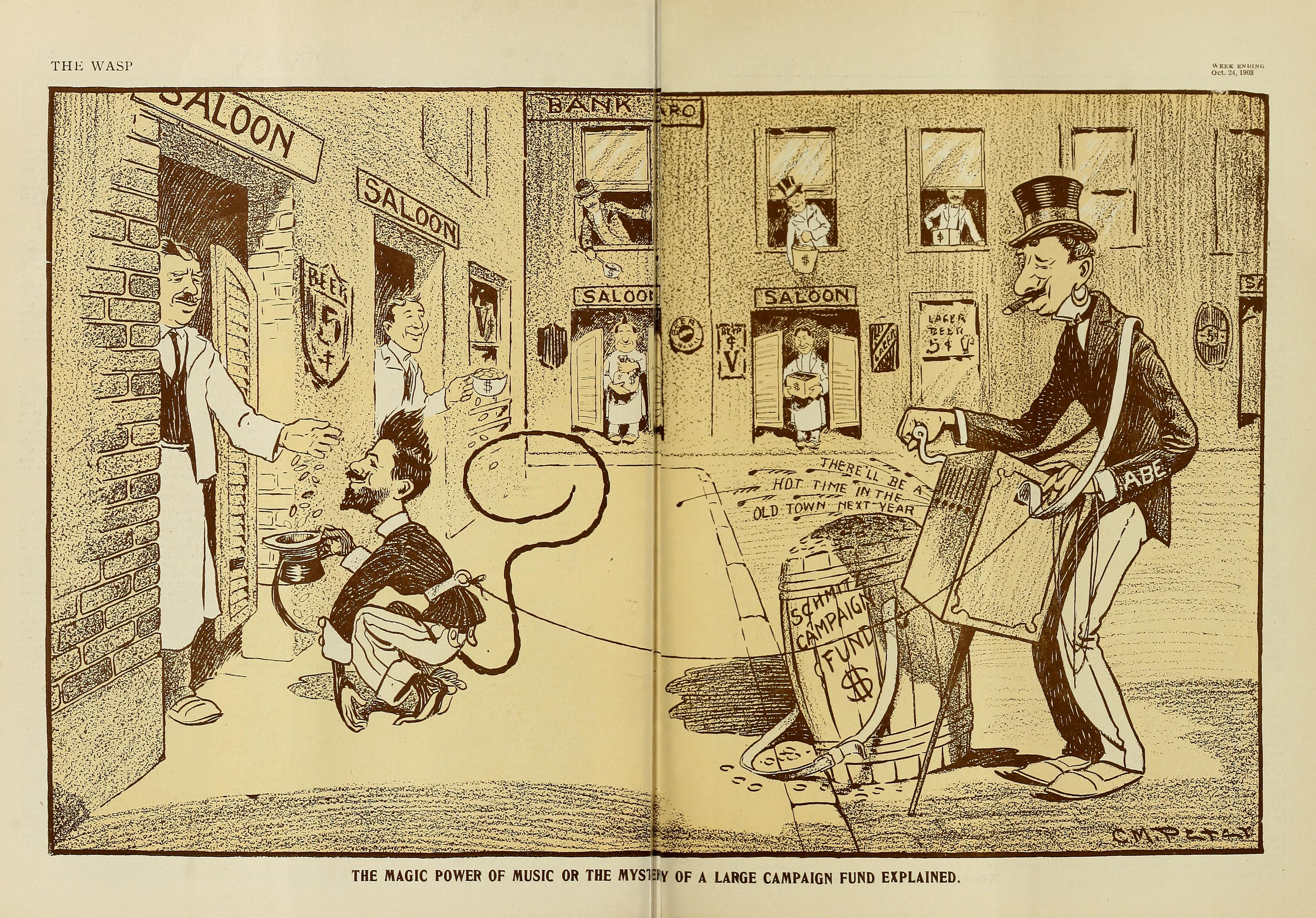
"The Magic Power of Music or the Mystery of a Large Campaign Fund Explained"

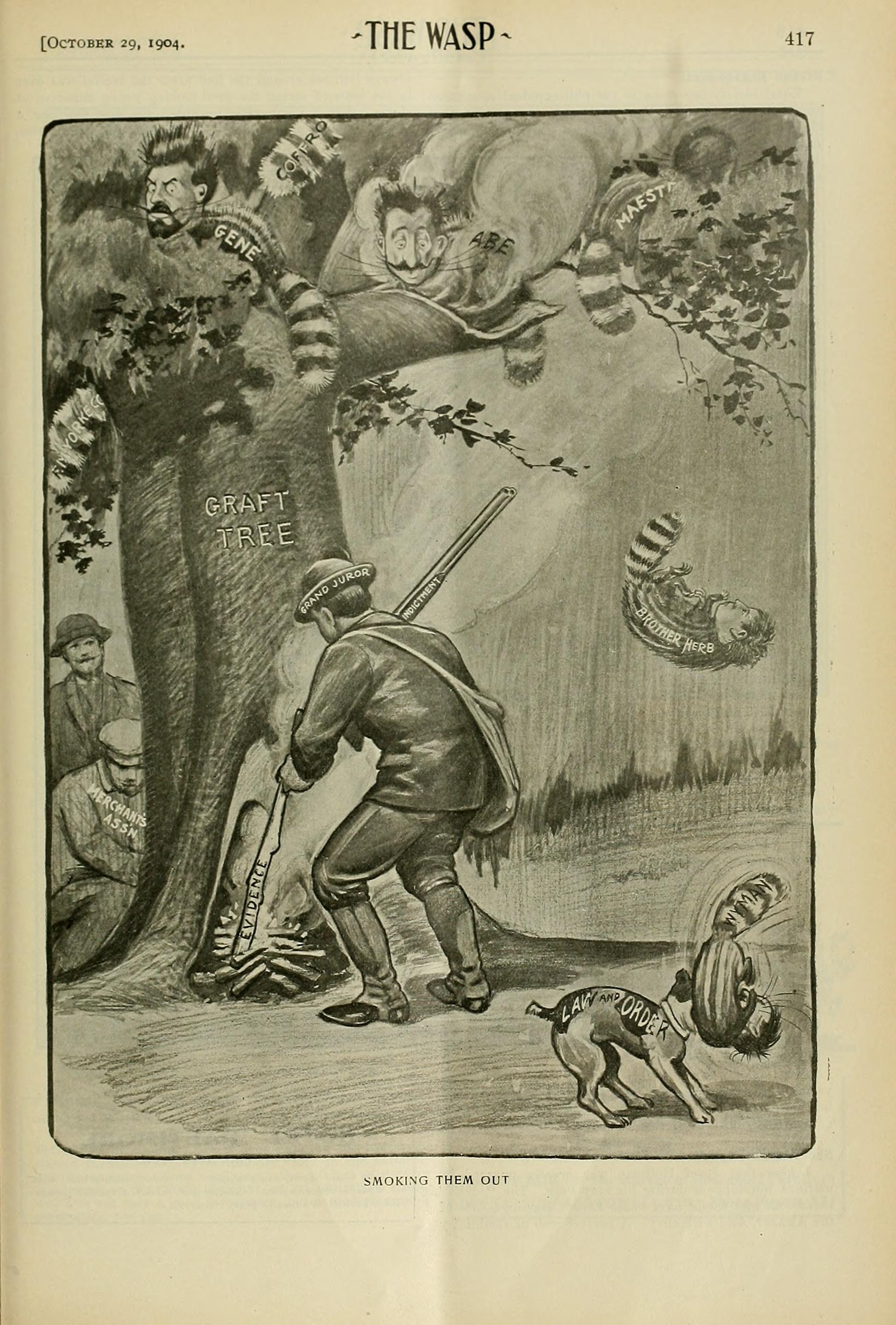
"Smoking Them Out"

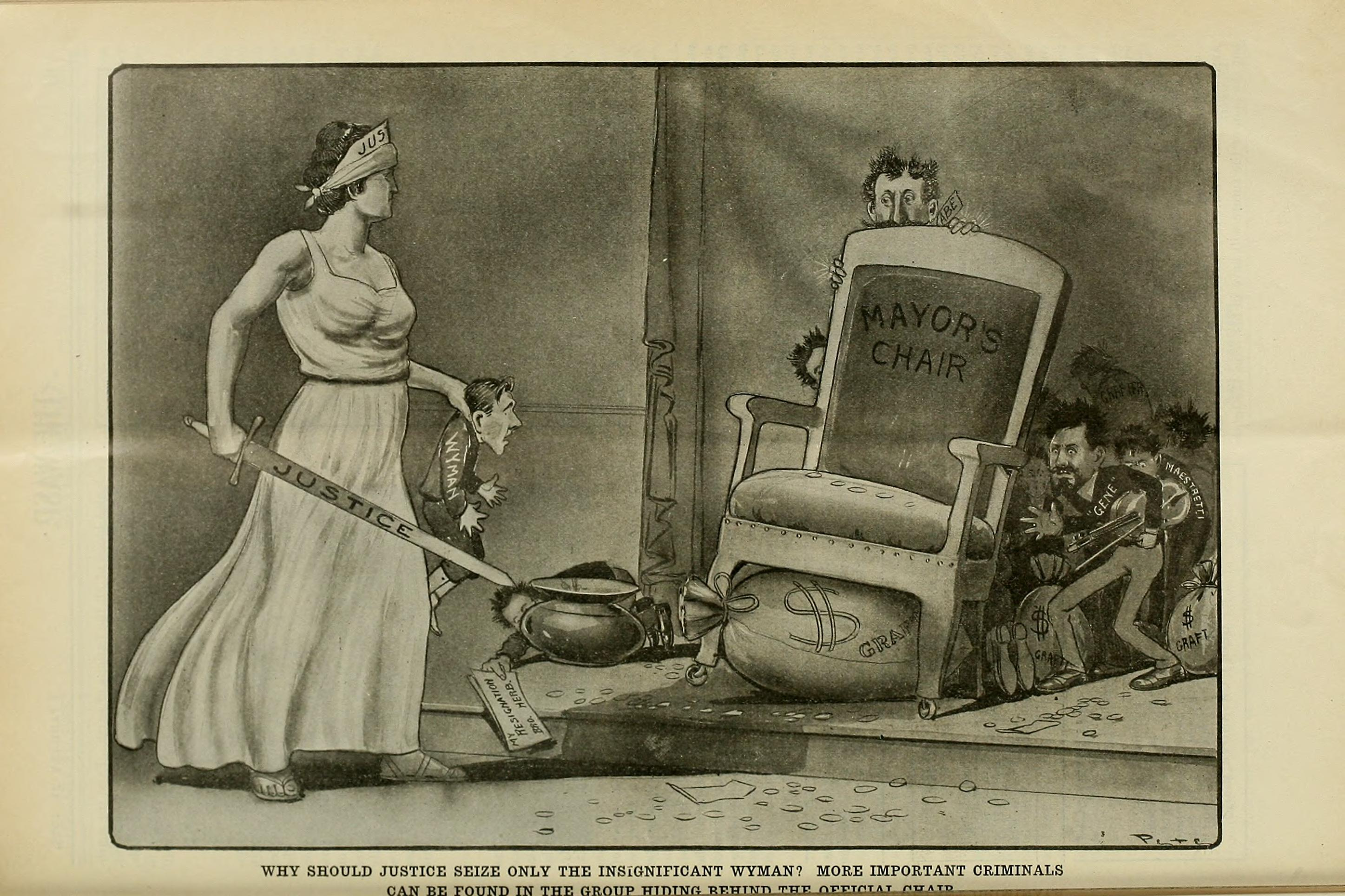
"Why Should Justice Seize Only the Insignificant Wyman?"

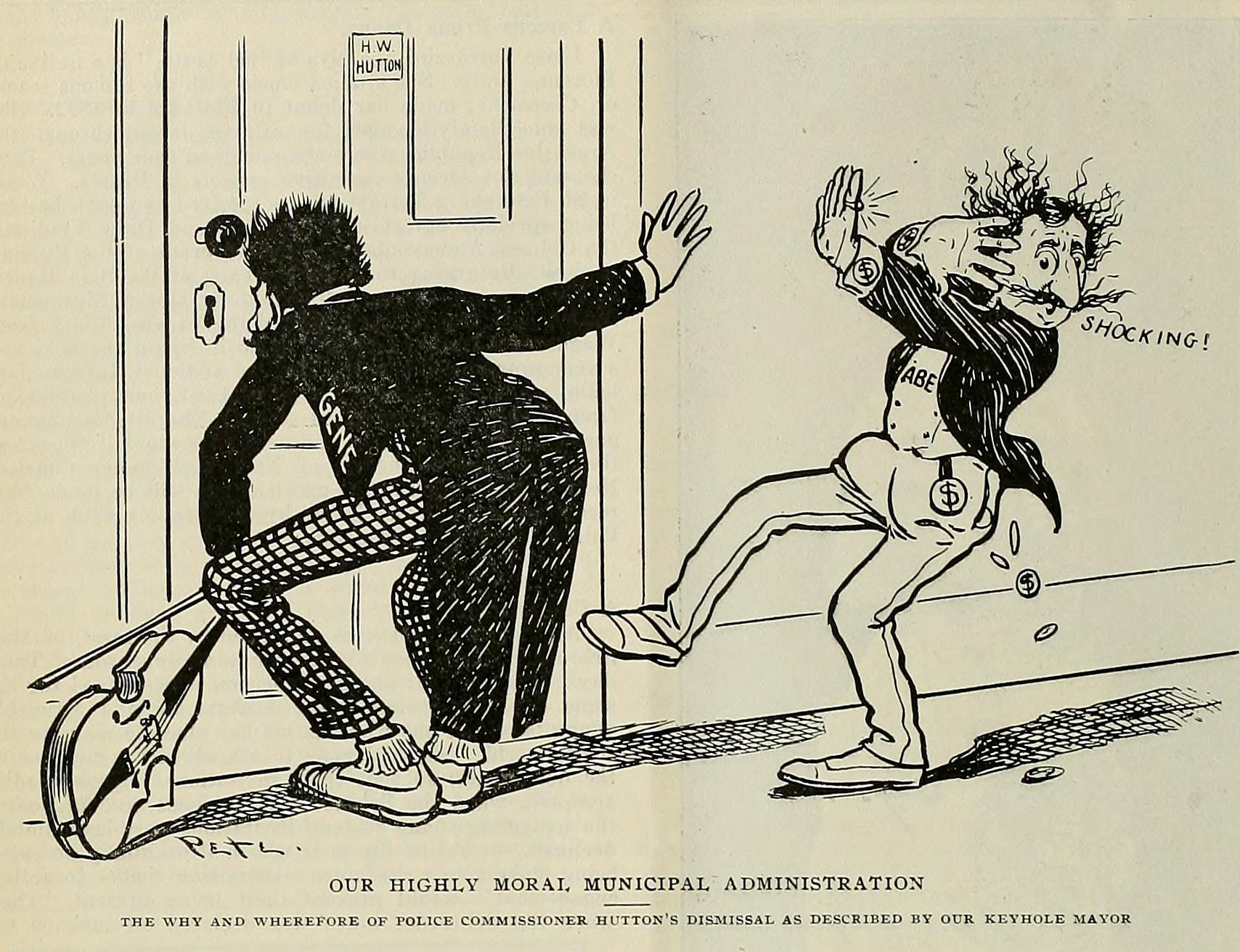
"Our Highly Moral Municipal Administration"

"A Warning"

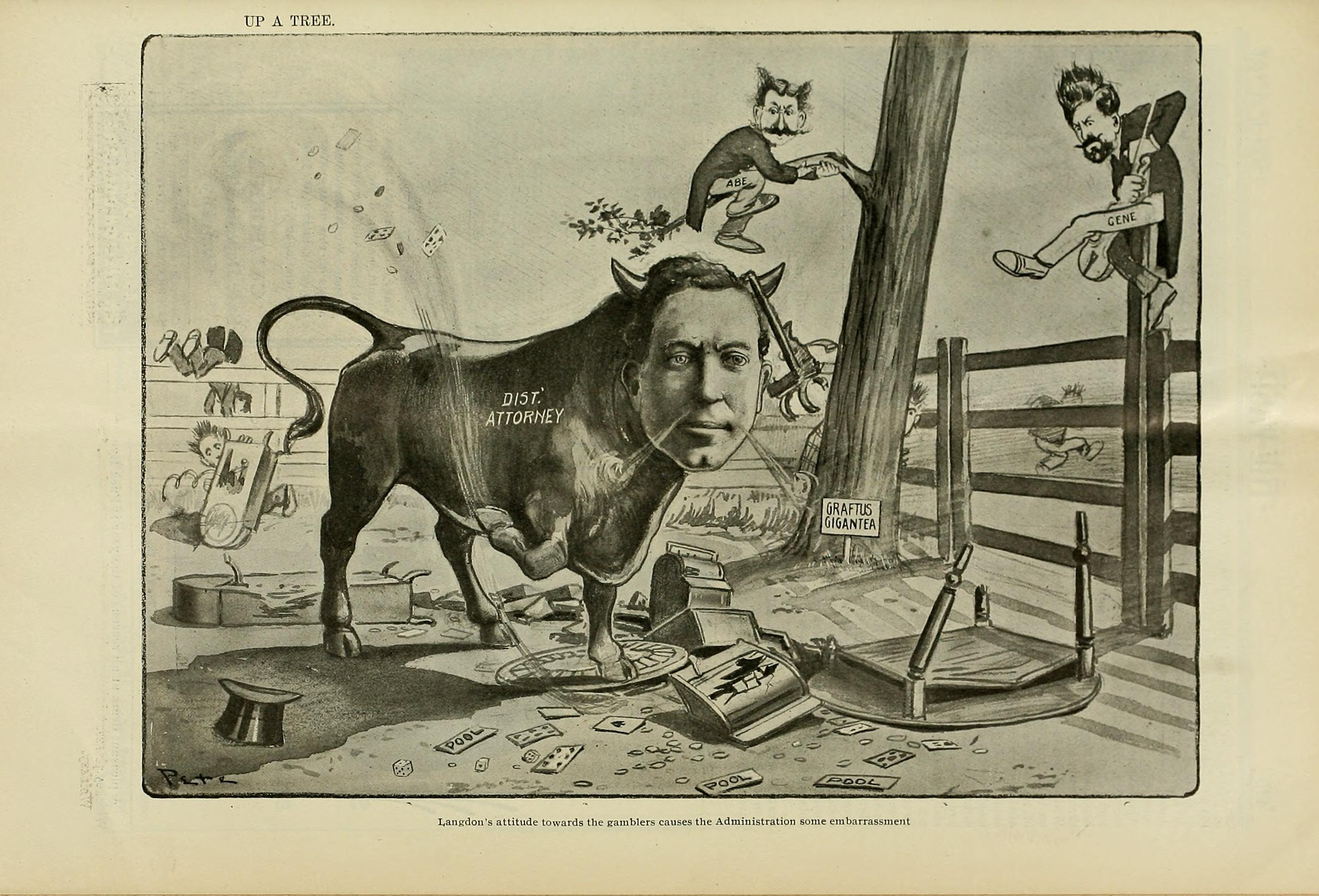
"Up A Tree"

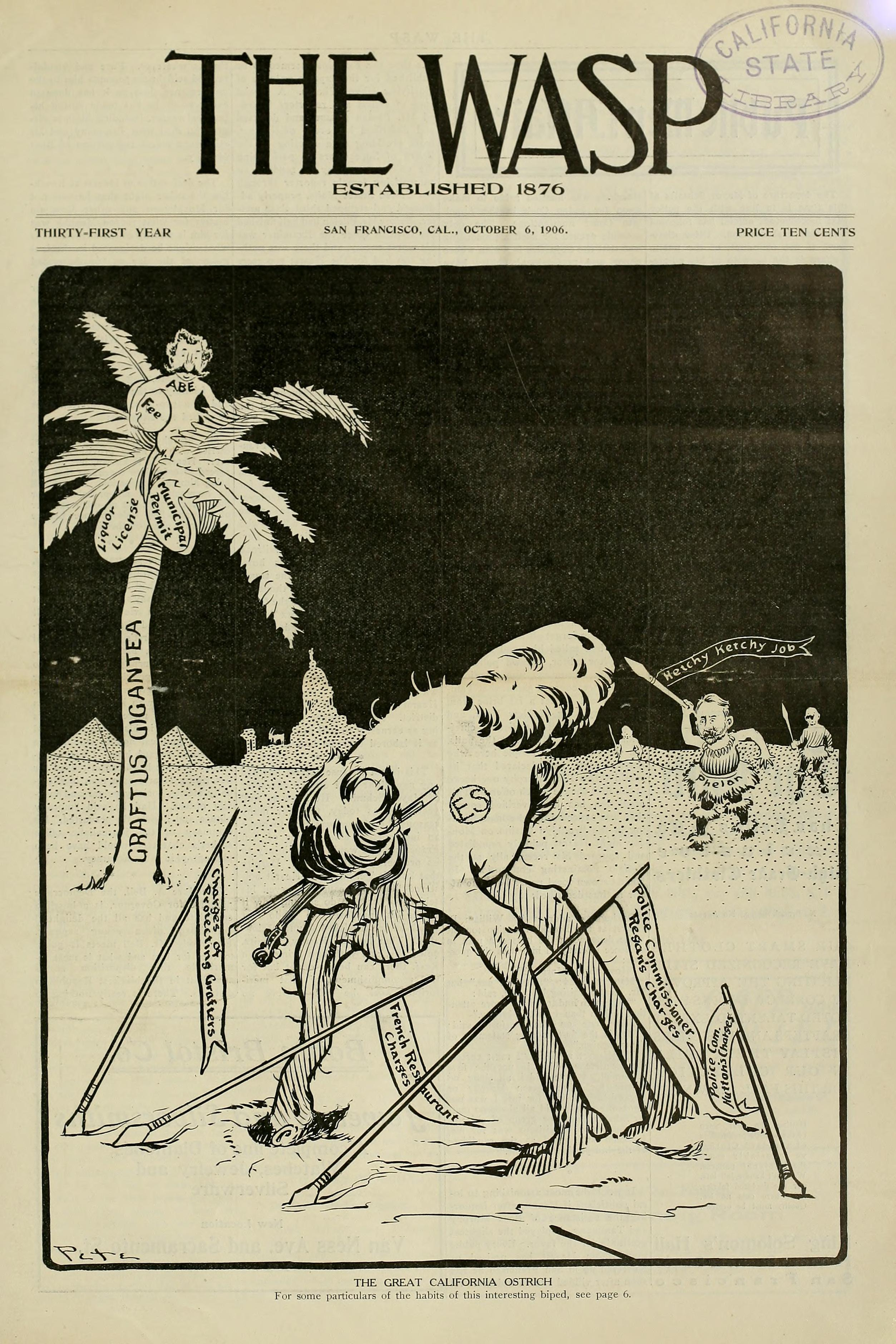
"The Great California Ostrich"

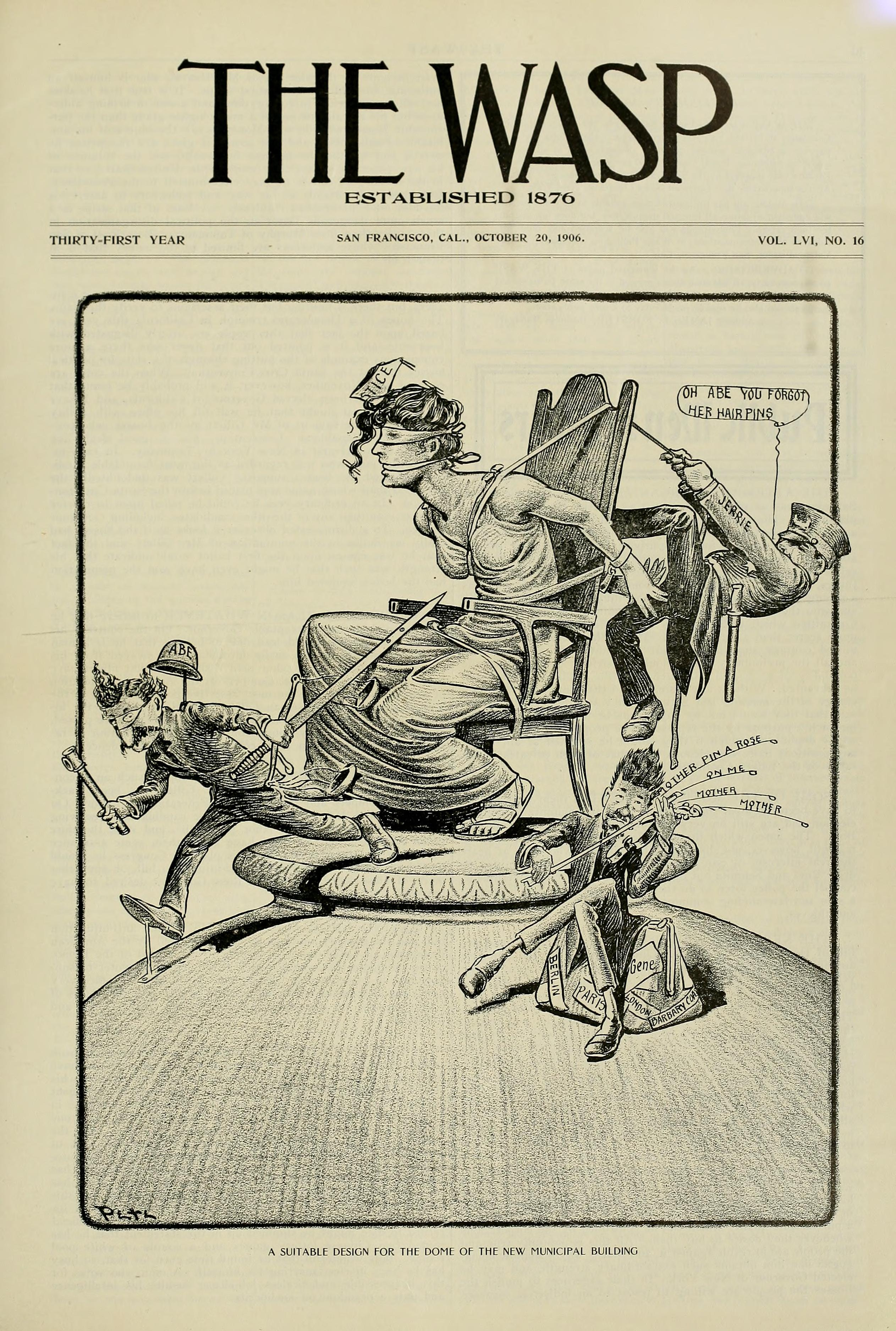
"A Suitable Design for the Dome of the New Municipal Building"

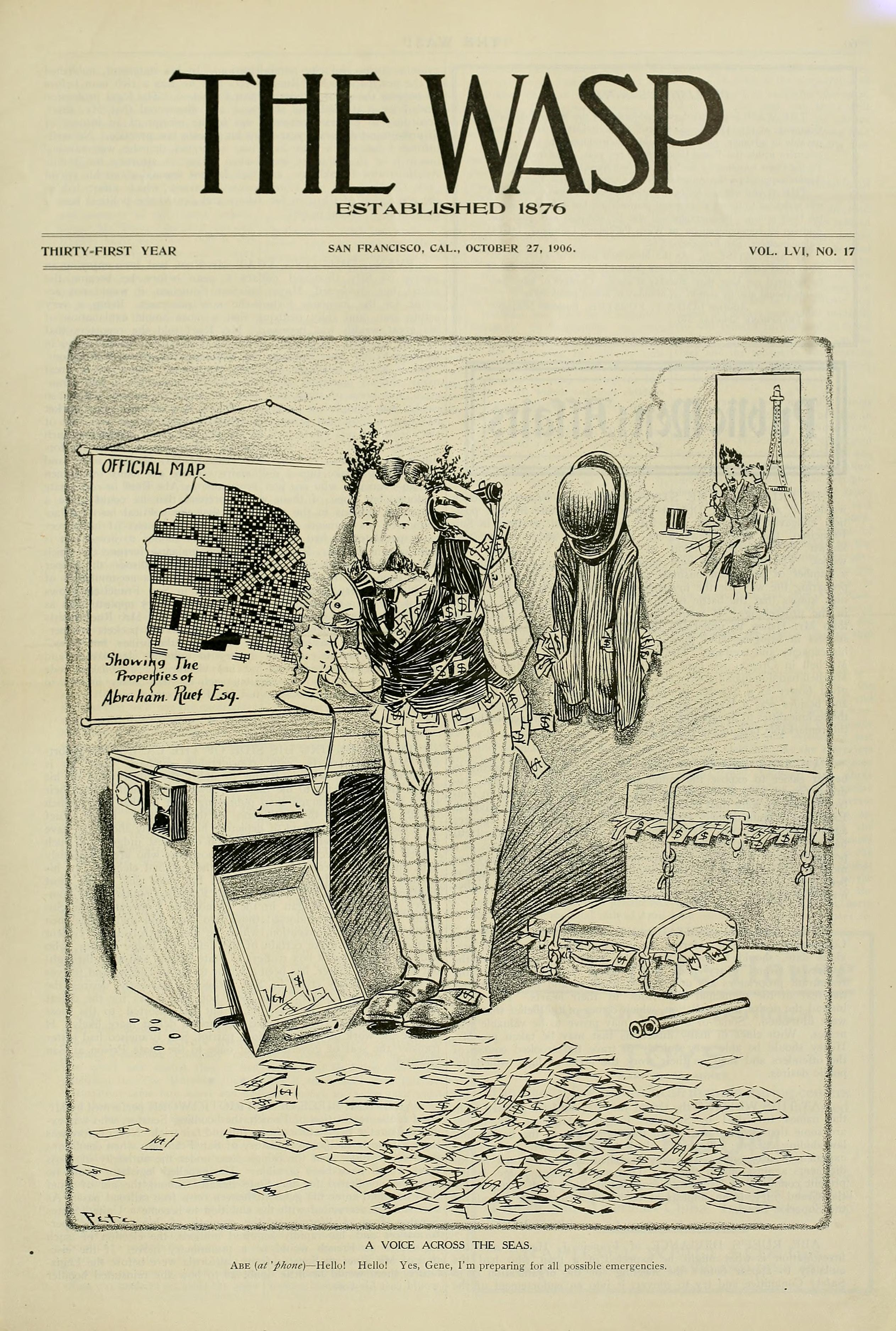
"A Voice Across the Seas"

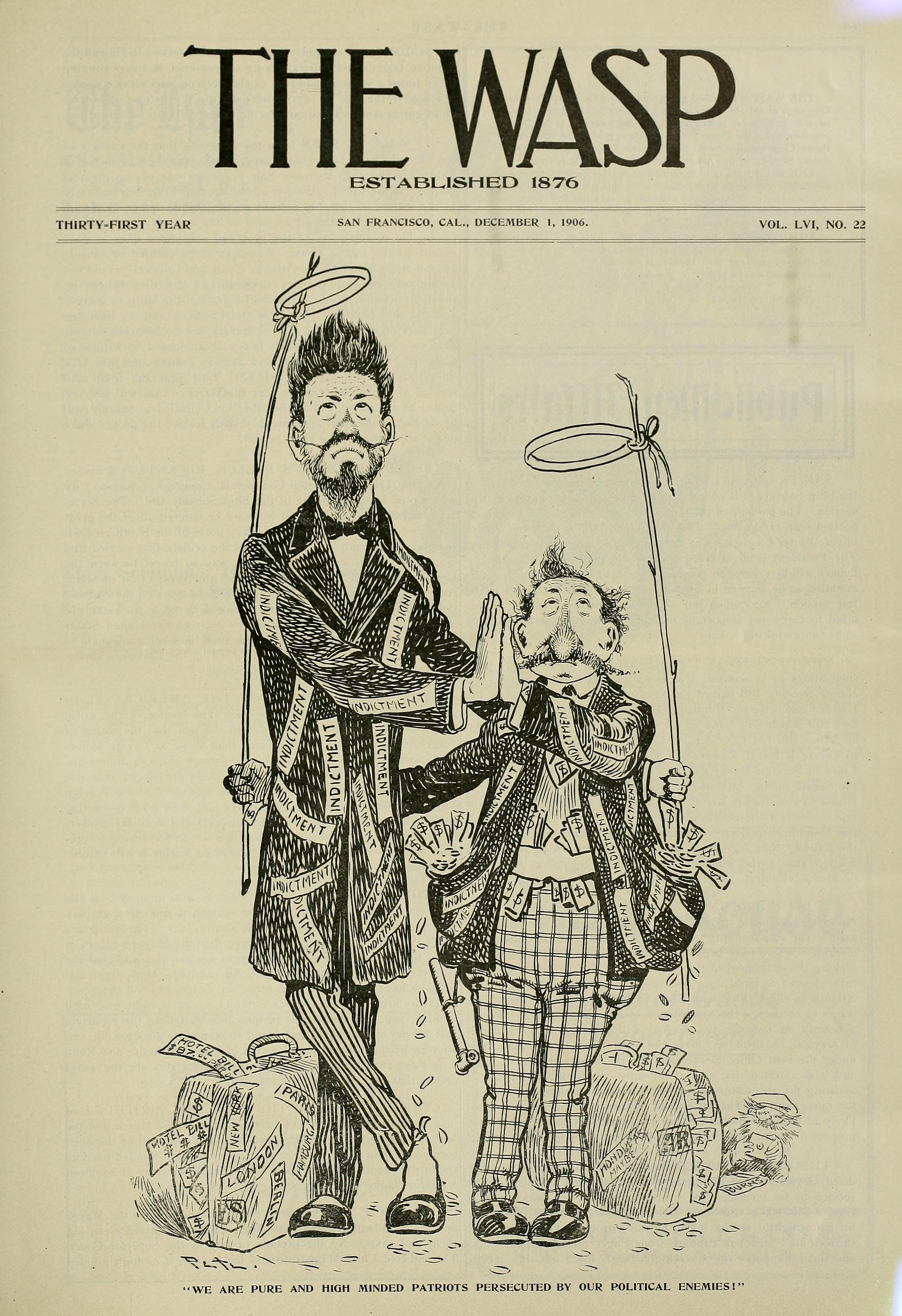
"'We Are Pure and High Minded Patriots Persecuted by Our Political Enemies!'"

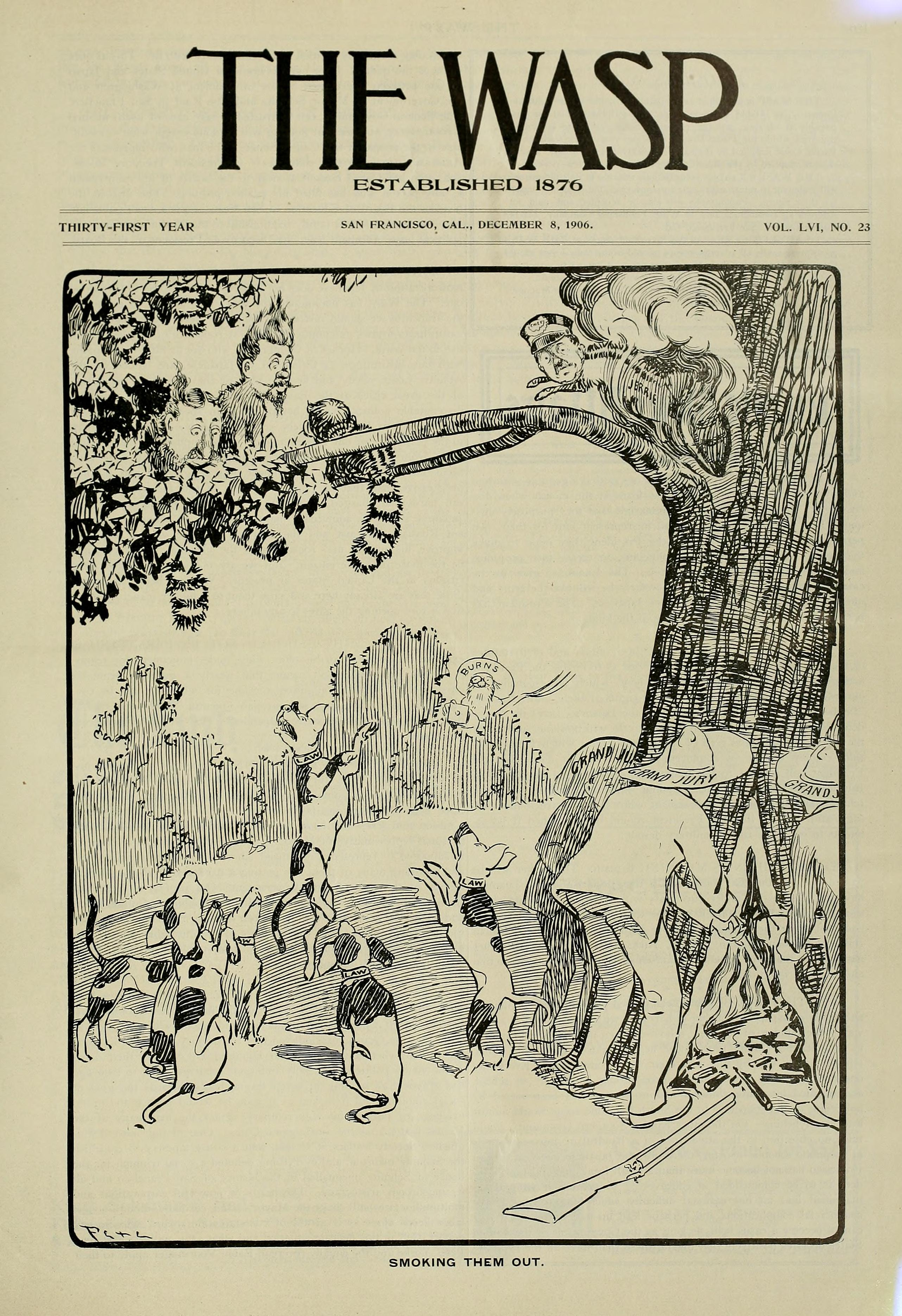
"Smoking Them Out"

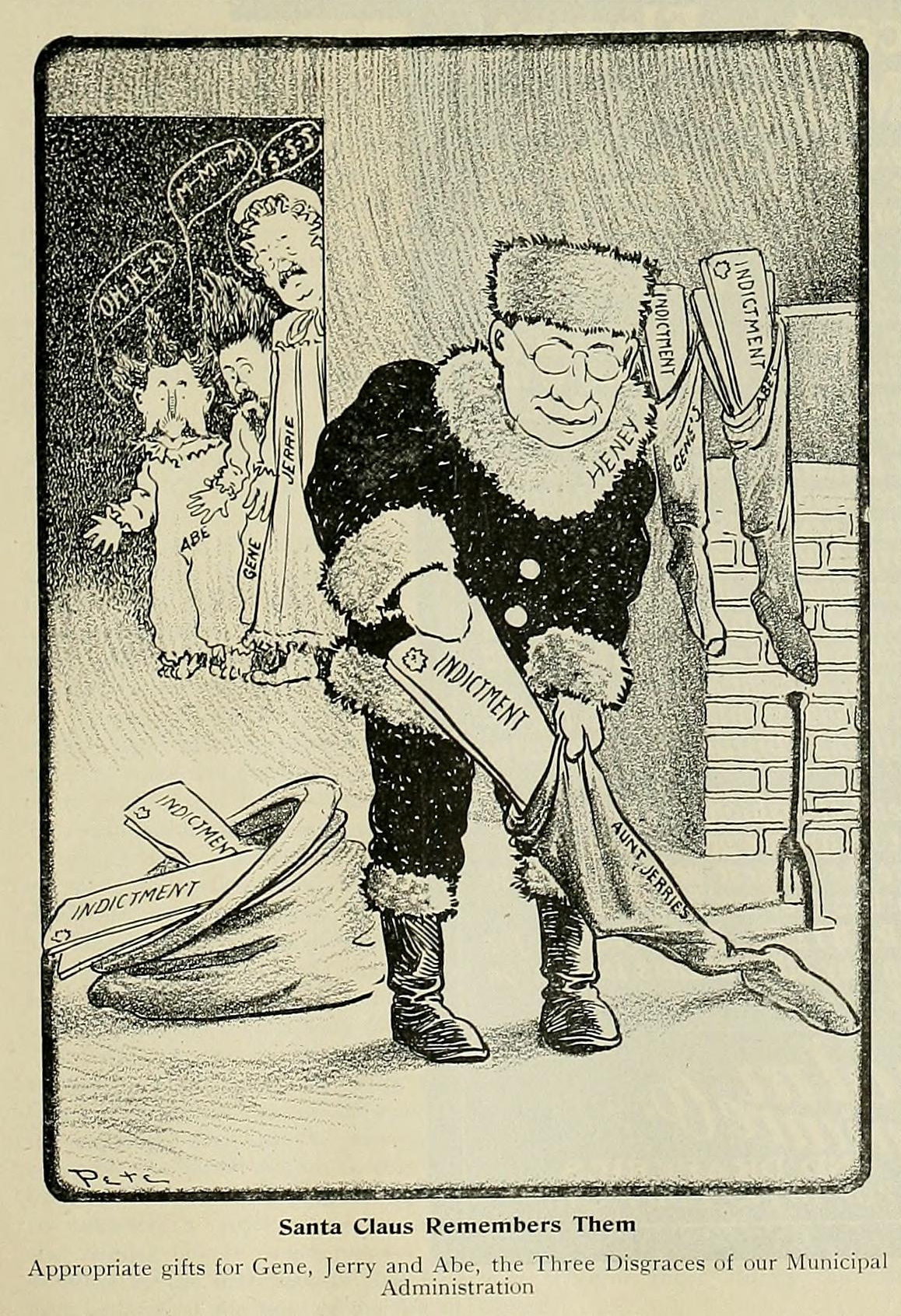
"Santa Claus Remembers Them"

"Schmitz Making Good His Promise to Seek Speedy Trial"

"The Sick Siamese Twins"

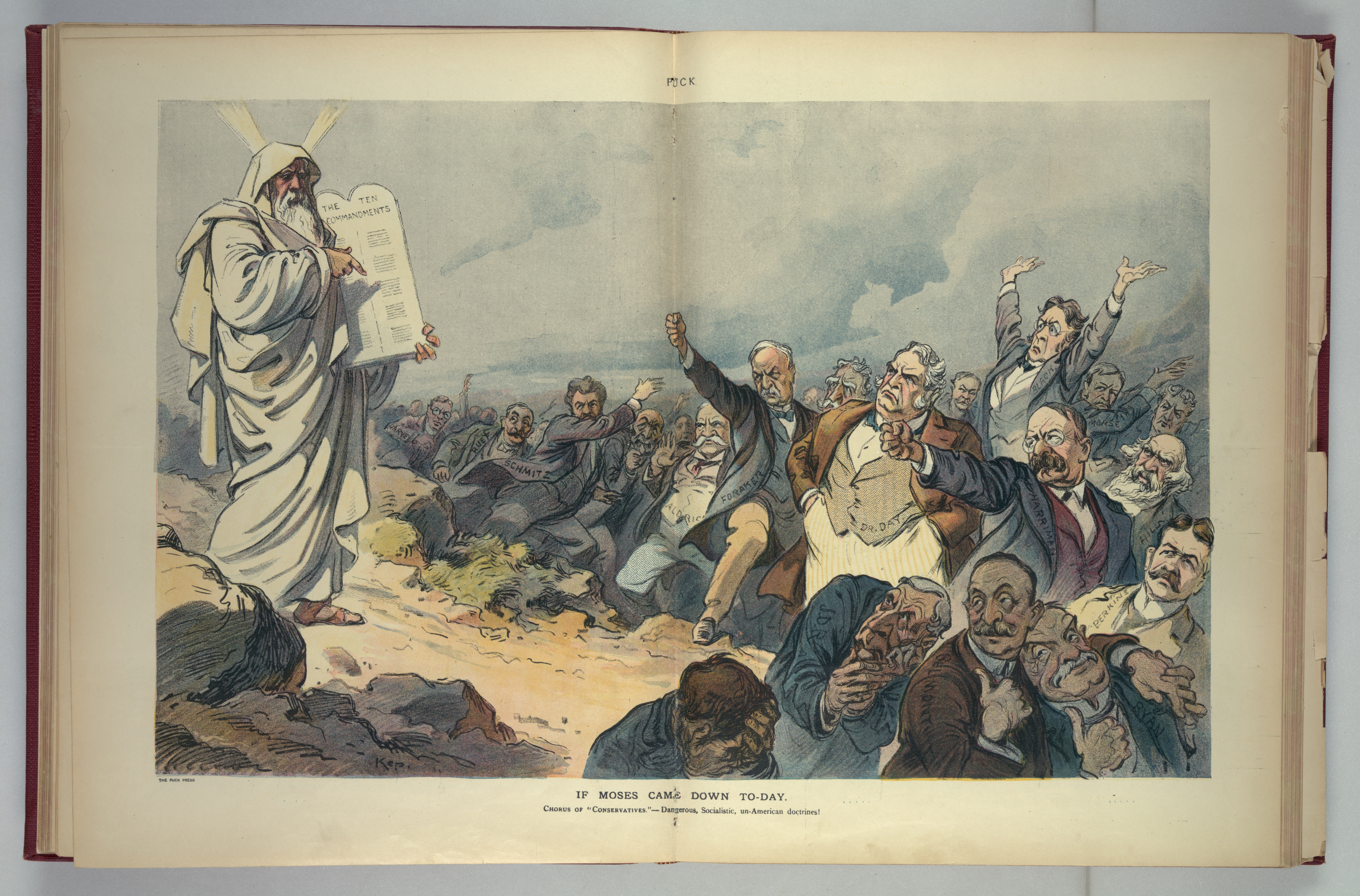
"If Moses Came Down To-day"

"What Are You Going to Do About It?"

== Literature ==
- New International Yearbook for 1907 and 1908
- George Kennan, "The Fight for Reform in San Francisco," McClure's, Sept. 1907 & Nov. 1907.

| Preceded by James D. Phelan | Mayor of San Francisco; 1902–1907 | Succeeded by Charles Boxton |
