= Michael Lane =

Michael Lane may refer to:

- Michael Lane (character), recurring character in Azrael comics
- Michael Lane (engineer) (1802–1868), British civil engineer
- Michael Lane (California politician) (1840–1893), California State Assemblyman
- Michael Lane (police commissioner), British police commissioner and naval officer
- J. Michael Lane (1936–2020), American epidemiologist
- Michael R. Lane (born 1952), American education administrator
- Mike Lane (1933–2015), American wrestler
- Mike Lane, character in the film Magic Mike
- Michael Lane Sylvester (born 1951), American operatic tenor
- Bronco Lane (Michael Patrick Lane, 1945–2024), British Army officer, mountaineer, and author
- Mick Lane (hurler) (born 1942), Irish hurler
- Mick Lane (rugby union) (1926–2025), Irish rugby union player

== See also ==
- 20564 Michaellane, a minor planet discovered in 1999
