= Joseph C. Gorman =

American politician (born 1844)

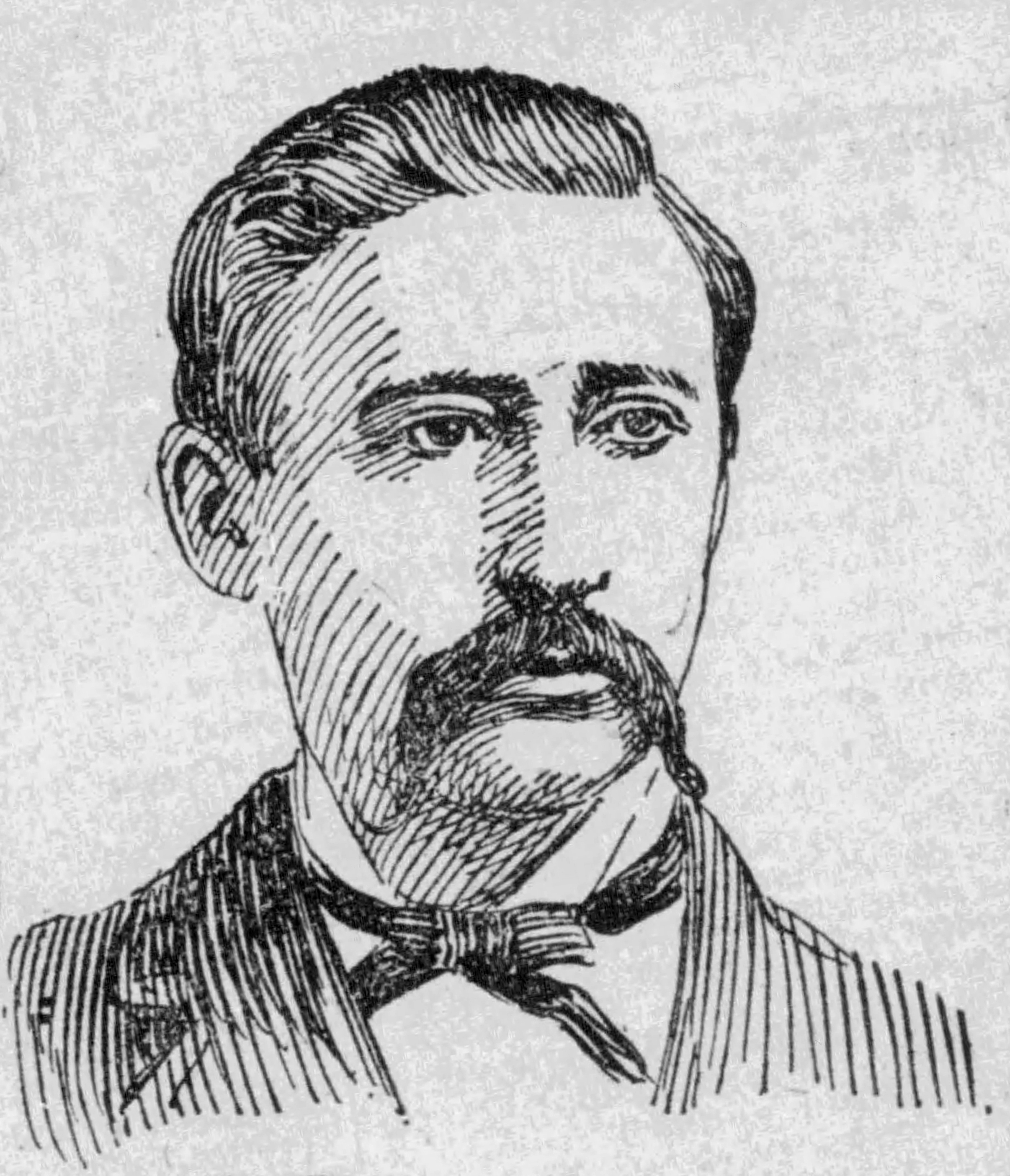
- Gorman c. 1894

Member of the California Senate from the 12th district
- In office January 5, 1880 – January 8, 1883
- Preceded by: M. J. Donovan
- Succeeded by: Multi-member district

Delegate to the Second Constitutional Convention of California
- In office September 28, 1878 – March 3, 1879
- Preceded by: Office established
- Succeeded by: Office abolished
- Constituency: San Francisco

Personal details
- Born: 1844 Ireland
- Died: c. 1914 (aged ~70)
- Party: Republican (1866–1877); Workingmen's (1877–1881); Democratic (after 1881)
- Occupation: Tinsmith, civil engineer, politician

Joseph C. Gorman (1844 – c. 1914) was an Irish American tinsmith, civil engineer and politician who served as a delegate to California's Second Constitutional Convention from 1878 to 1879, in the California State Senate from 1880 to 1883, as a clerk for State Controller John P. Dunn from 1883 to 1891, and as secretary of the State Board of Examiners from 1898 to 1899. He also served briefly as secretary of the San Francisco Board of Fire Commissioners in 1900, resigning his position to attend to personal matters.

When the California State Legislature convened in 1881 to elect a U.S. Senator, fellow Workingmen's senator Warren Chase nominated economist and newspaper publisher Henry George. George only received two votes out of 40 cast in the State Senate; one from Chase, and the other from Gorman.

== Sources ==
- Mohan, Hugh J.; Clough, E. H.; Cosgrave, John P. (1880). Pen Pictures of Our Representative Men. Sacramento: H. A. Weaver's Valley Press. pp. 16–17.
- "JIM BUDD THE MAN". San Francisco Chronicle. San Francisco. August 25, 1894.
