= Thorwald Klaudius Nelson =

American politician (1849–1888)

Member of the California Senate from the 11th district
- In office January 5, 1880 – January 5, 1885
- Preceded by: John S. Boyston
- Succeeded by: Multi-member district

Delegate to the Second Constitutional Convention of California
- In office September 28, 1878 – March 3, 1879
- Preceded by: Office established
- Succeeded by: Office abolished
- Constituency: San Francisco

Personal details
- Born: September 13, 1849 Bergen, Norway
- Died: March 5, 1888 (aged 38) Santa Barbara, California, U.S.
- Party: Republican (before 1877); Workingmen's (1877–1881); Democratic (after 1881)
- Children: 3
- Occupation: Pipe carver, woodturner, politician

Thorwald Klaudius Nelson (Note: Thorwald sometimes spelled Thorvald) (September 13, 1849 – March 5, 1888) was a Norwegian American meerschaum pipe carver, woodturner and politician who served as a delegate to California's Second Constitutional Convention from 1878 to 1879 and in the California State Senate from 1880 to 1885. At just 30 years old, he was the youngest member of the Senate. He also served as president of the Scandinavian Club of the Workingmen's Party of California.
