= William W. Cuthbert =

American politician (1856–1939)

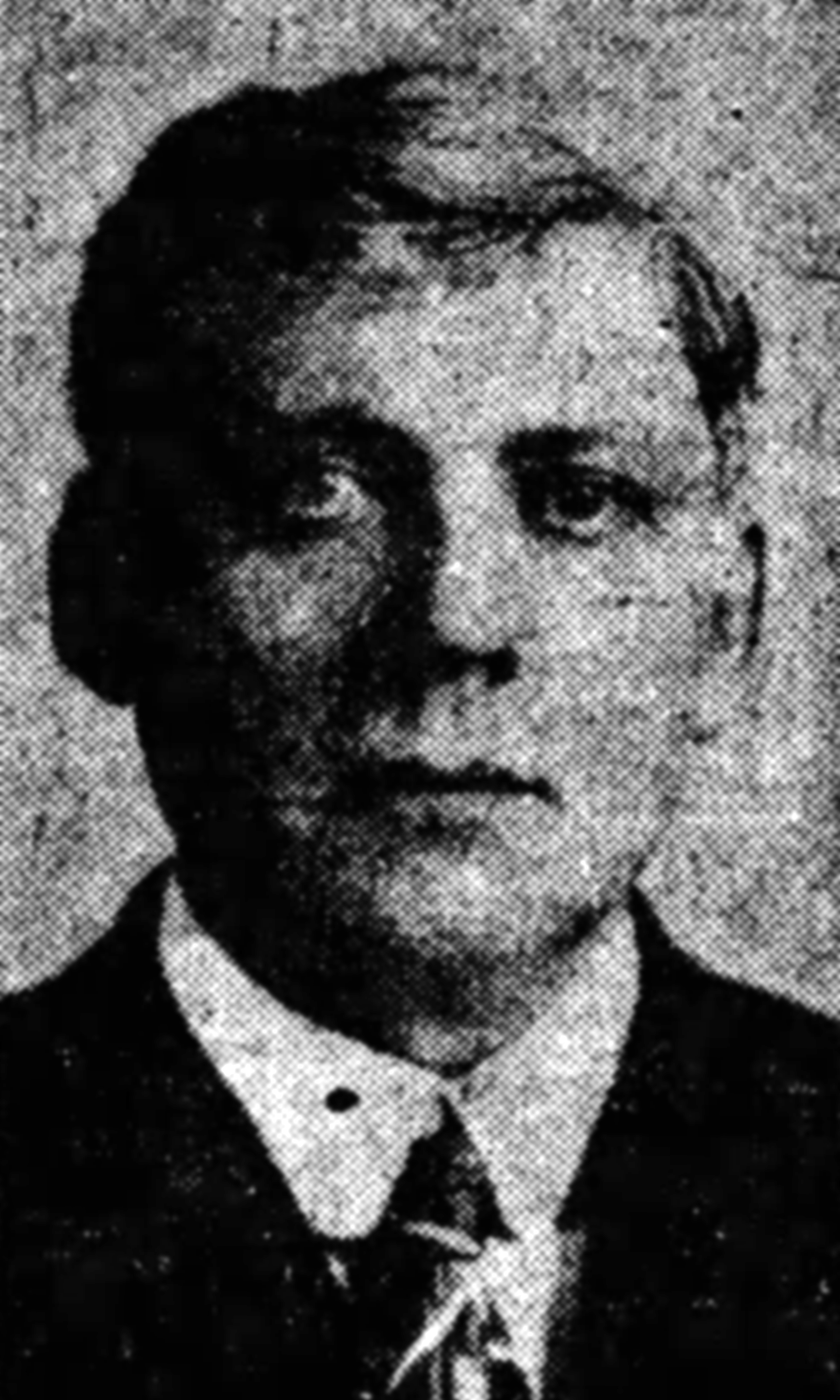
- Cuthbert c. 1911

Member of the California State Assembly from the 9th district
- In office January 5, 1880 – January 3, 1881
- Preceded by: Multi-member district
- Succeeded by: Multi-member district

Personal details
- Born: 1856 Australia (Note: Some sources claim he was born at sea between Australia and the United States.)
- Died: February 26, 1939 (aged 82) Oakland, California, U.S.
- Party: Workingmen's (before 1881); Democratic (1881–1903); Republican (after 1903)
- Spouse(s): Frances V. Karcher (m. 1880; died 1894) Eva Alvira Waldron (m. 1905)
- Children: 3
- Occupation: Printer, politician, labor leader

William W. Cuthbert (1856 – February 26, 1939) was an Australian American printer, politician and labor leader who served in the California State Assembly from 1880 to 1881. At just 23 years old, he was one of the youngest members of the Legislature. He was later active in Democratic Party politics and was an unsuccessful candidate for State Assembly in 1892.

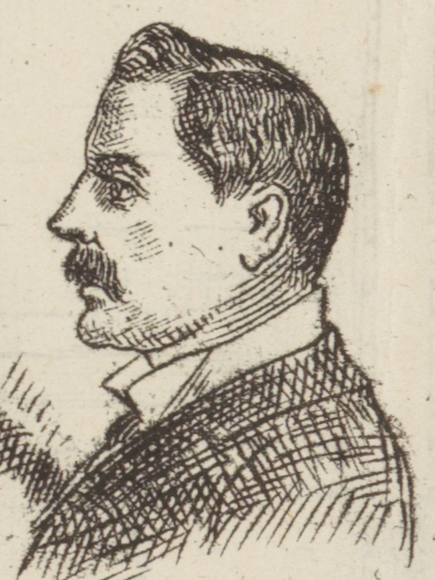
Sketch by Carl Browne, 1880

Cuthbert eventually joined the Republican Party and was appointed general foreman of the California State Printing Office, serving from 1903 to 1909. He also served as president of the Sacramento and Oakland Typographical Unions.

While serving in the Assembly, Cuthbert married his first wife Frances, with whom he had two children. She died in 1894, and 11 years later he married his second wife Eva, with whom he had one more child.
