= Jeremiah J. McCarthy =

American politician (1849–1901)

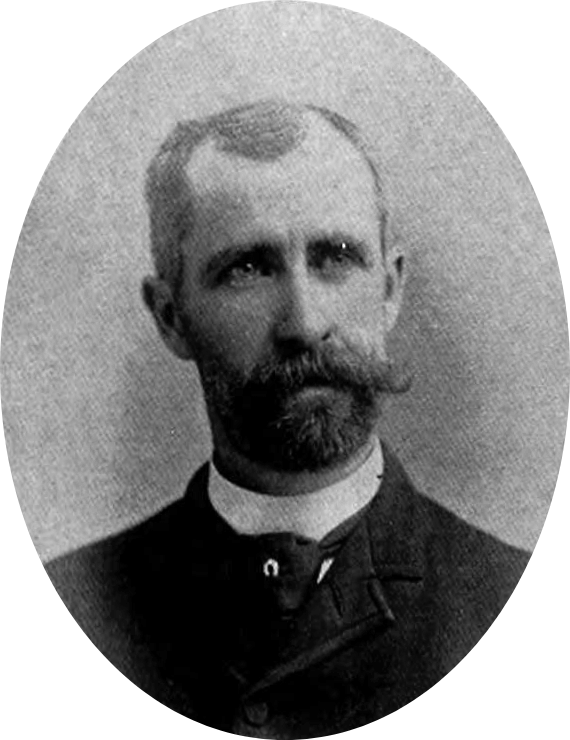
- McCarthy c. 1896

Member of the California State Assembly from the 11th district
- In office January 5, 1880 – January 3, 1881
- Preceded by: Multi-member district
- Succeeded by: Multi-member district

Personal details
- Born: 1849 or 1853 New York City, U.S.
- Died: March 16, 1901 (aged 52) San Francisco, California, U.S.
- Party: Workingmen's (before 1881); Democratic (after 1881)
- Education: Read law
- Occupation: Blacksmith, lawyer, politician

Military service
- Allegiance: United States
- Branch/service: California National Guard
- Years of service: 1872–1878
- Rank: Sergeant
- Unit: 3rd Infantry Regiment, Meagher Guard

Jeremiah James McCarthy (1849 or 1853 – March 16, 1901) was an American blacksmith, lawyer and politician who served in the California State Assembly from 1880 to 1881 and as secretary of the San Francisco Board of City Hall Commissioners from 1893 to 1897. He was active in Workingmen's and Democratic Party politics.

== Career ==
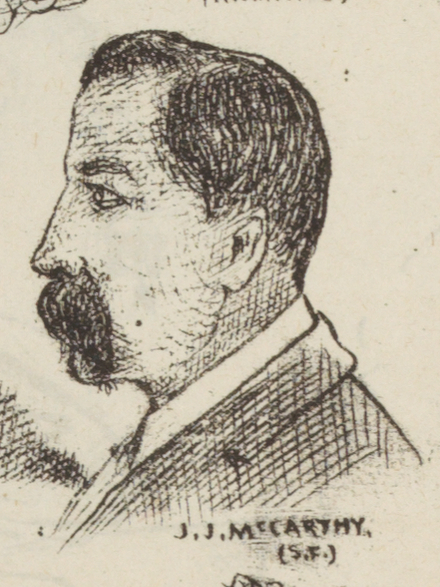
Sketch by Carl Browne, 1880

In the Assembly, McCarthy was appointed chairman of the San Francisco delegation by his colleagues. He was also nominated for speaker pro tempore, coming in second place with 22 votes out of 76 cast. One biography contrasted him with his fellow Workingmen's Party assemblymen as follows:

Unlike Maybell, he is modest; unlike Braunhart, he talks only when he has something sensible and pertinent to say; and, unlike McDade, his elocution is deliberate and impressive. He possesses a magnificent speaking voice, and when experience shall have inspired him with greater confidence in his own powers he will use it to some effect in the political world.

— Hugh J. Mohan, E. H. Clough and John P. Cosgrave, Pen Pictures of Our Representative Men, 1880

McCarthy served as a Sergeant in the California National Guard from 1872 to 1878, from which he was dishonorably discharged but later pardoned. He studied law under and clerked for former assemblyman James G. Maguire. McCarthy was active in the Supreme Order of Caucasians, the Knights of Father Mathew, the St. Patrick's Mutual Alliance Association, and the Irish National Land League.
