= John Burns (California politician) =

American politician (born 1840)

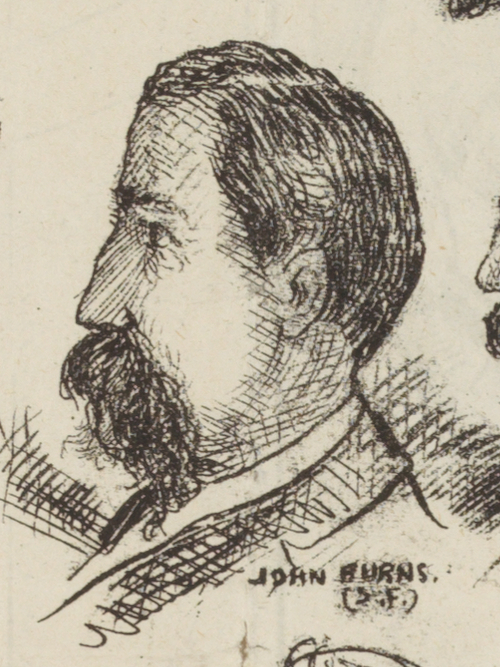
- Sketch by Carl Browne, 1880

Member of the California State Assembly from the 12th district
- In office January 5, 1880 – January 8, 1883
- Preceded by: Multi-member district
- Succeeded by: Multi-member district

Personal details
- Born: 1840 Ireland
- Party: Democratic (before 1877, after 1881); Workingmen's (1877–1881)
- Occupation: Sailmaker, labor leader, politician

John Burns (born 1840) was an Irish American sailmaker, labor leader and politician who served in the California State Assembly from 1880 to 1883. He was elected to his first term as a member of the Workingmen's Party of California and to his second on a Workingmen's-Democratic Fusion ticket. He was active in his trade and the local Sailmakers' Union as late as 1890.
