= Senator Cross =

Senator Cross may refer to:

- Burton M. Cross (1902–1998), Maine State Senate
- Charles W. Cross (California politician) (1848–1924), California State Senate
- Elmo Cross (born 1942), Virginia State Senate
- George H. Cross (1854–1946), Wyoming State Senate
- J. Emory Cross (1914–2005), Florida State Senate
- Joseph Cross (judge) (1843–1913), New Jersey State Senate
