= Thomas Kane =

Thomas Kane may refer to:

- Thomas Kane (economist) (born 1961), Harvard professor
- Thomas Kane (Medal of Honor) (1841–?), American Civil War sailor
- Thomas Kane, member of The Slickee Boys
- Thomas Franklin Kane (1863–1953), president of the University of Washington
- Thomas L. Kane (1822–1883), Civil War veteran
- Thomas R. Kane (1924–2019), Stanford professor of applied mechanics
- Tommy Kane (born 1964), American football player
- Tom Kane (1962–2026), American voice actor
- Tom Kane (baseball) (1906–1973), Major League Baseball player
- Tom Kane (film producer), American film and television producer
- Tom Kane (politician), Canadian-born American politician in Montana
- Tommy Kane, character in Alex Cross
- Thomas Kane (California politician) (1835–1905), Irish-born American politician in California

== See also ==
- Tom Kain (born 1963), director of sports marketing at Nike
- Thomas Kean (pronounced like Kane, born 1935), former New Jersey governor and head of the 9/11 Commission
