= John P. West =

American politician (1825–1892)

John Patterson West
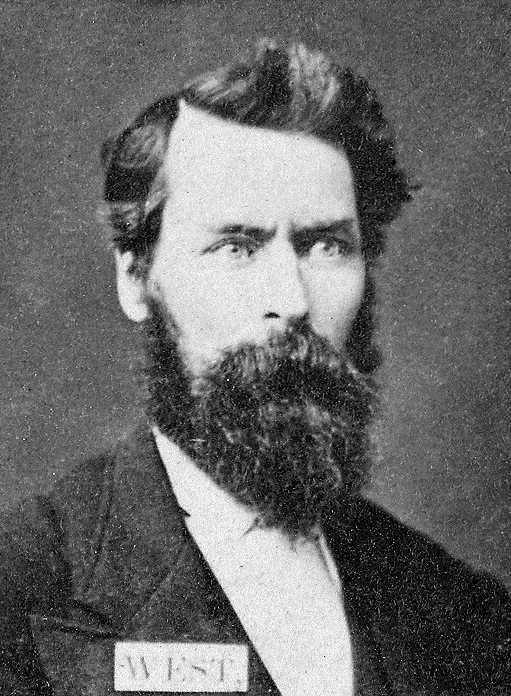
- West c. 1874

Member of the California Senate from the 2nd district
- In office January 5, 1880 – January 8, 1883
- Preceded by: George H. Smith
- Succeeded by: Reginaldo Francisco del Valle

Delegate to the Second Constitutional Convention of California
- In office September 28, 1878 – March 3, 1879
- Preceded by: Office established
- Succeeded by: Office abolished
- Constituency: Los Angeles

Member of the Iowa Senate from the 11th district
- In office January 10, 1870 – March 30, 1875
- Preceded by: Theron Woolson
- Succeeded by: John Simson Woolson

Member of the Iowa House of Representatives from the 8th district
- In office January 8, 1866 – January 12, 1868
- Preceded by: Thomas A. Bereman
- Succeeded by: John Posey Grantham
- In office January 13, 1862 – January 10, 1864
- Preceded by: Reuben F. Connor
- Succeeded by: William C. Woodworth

Personal details
- Born: February 9, 1825 Newtownhamilton, County Armagh, Ireland
- Died: June 11, 1892 (aged 67) Glendora, California, U.S.
- Party: Republican
- Other political affiliations: Whig (before 1848); Free Soil (1848–1854); Workingmen's (1878–1881)
- Spouse: Elizabeth Harshman (m. 1848)
- Children: 10
- Occupation: Farmer, military officer, politician

Military service
- Allegiance: United States
- Branch/service: United States Army
- Years of service: 1861–1864
- Rank: Sergeant
- Unit: 14th Iowa Infantry Regiment
- Battles/wars: American Civil War; Red River Campaign

John Patterson West (February 9, 1825 – June 12, 1892) was an Irish American farmer, military officer, and politician who served in the Iowa House of Representatives from 1862 to 1864 and from 1866 to 1868, the Iowa State Senate from 1870 to 1876, and the California State Senate from 1880 to 1883. In 1878, he was elected a delegate to California's Second Constitutional Convention on the Workingmen's ticket, representing Los Angeles County.

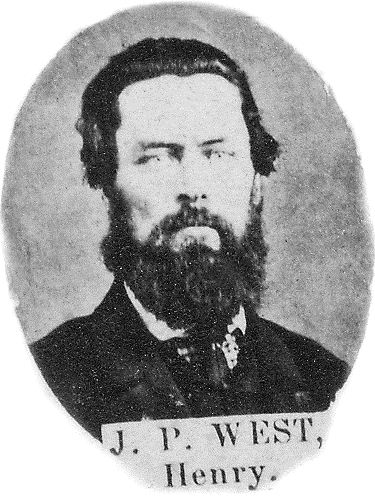
West in the Iowa State House c. 1862

West served as a sergeant in the 14th Iowa Infantry Regiment of the Union Army during the Civil War, participating in the Red River campaign. He resigned from the Iowa State Senate in 1875 to move to California, and was elected a justice of the peace in Wilmington Township.
