= John J. McCallion =

American politician (1836–1883)

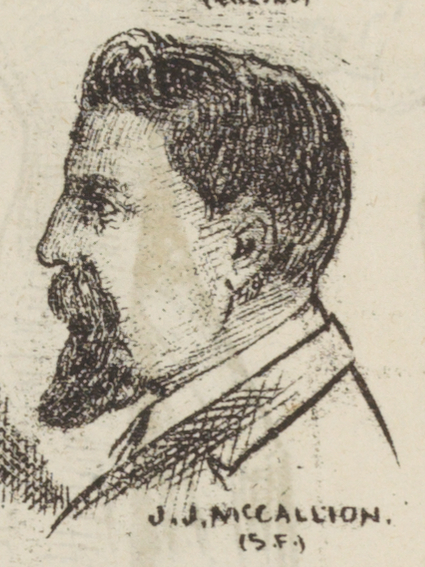
- Sketch by Carl Browne, 1880

Member of the California State Assembly from the 11th district
- In office January 5, 1880 – January 8, 1883
- Preceded by: Multi-member district
- Succeeded by: Multi-member district

Personal details
- Born: 1836 or 1840 County Donegal, Ireland
- Died: June 6, 1883 (aged 47) San Francisco, California, U.S.
- Party: Workingmen's
- Other political affiliations: Democratic (1880)
- Spouse: Susan
- Children: 1
- Occupation: Sailor, lumber worker, brakeman, saloon keeper, politician

John J. McCallion (1836 or 1840 – June 6, 1883) was an Irish American sailor, lumber worker, brakeman, saloon keeper and politician who served in the California State Assembly from 1880 to 1883. A leading member of the Workingmen's Party of California, McCallion came to oppose party president Denis Kearney and those who sought to align the WPC with the Democratic Party, although he accepted the latter's endorsement in 1880.

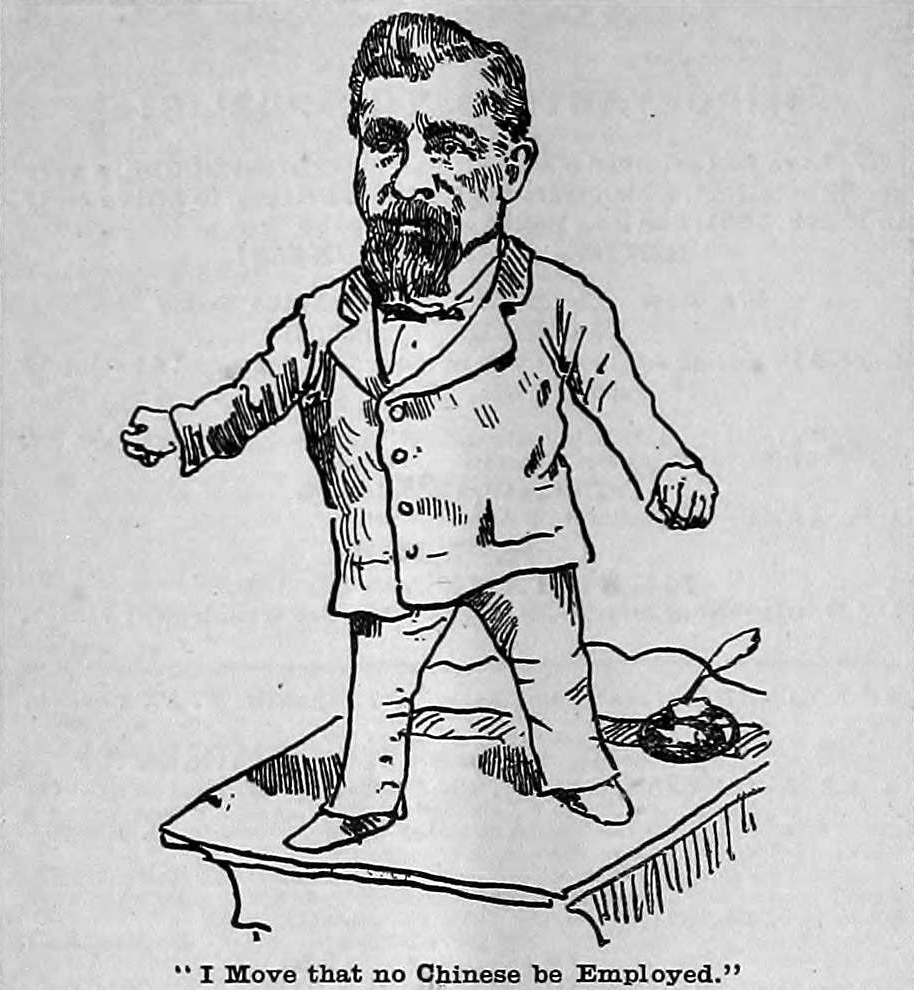
"'I Move That No Chinese Be Employed,'" a caricature of McCallion published in the San Francisco News Letter, May 7, 1881

McCallion was also president of the local Ancient Order of Hibernians, authoring a resolution expressing the sympathy of the State Legislature for the people of Ireland during the Irish Famine of 1879. He married his wife Susan in 1881, with whom he had one child.
