= Anderson M. Walker =

American politician (1831–1882)

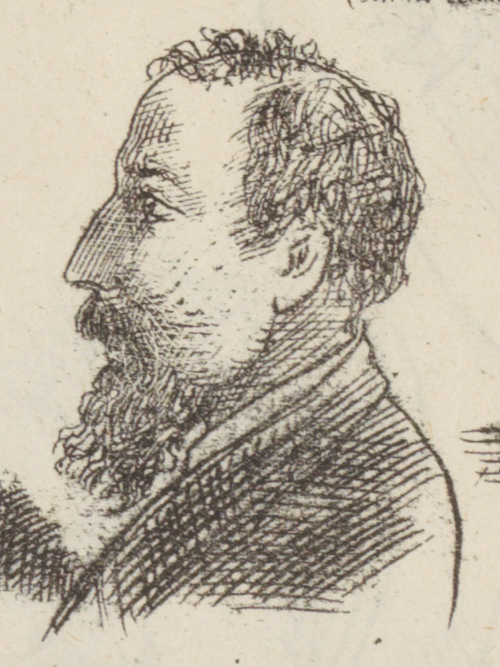
- Sketch by Carl Browne, 1880

Member of the California State Assembly from the 24th district
- In office January 5, 1880 – January 3, 1881
- Preceded by: Multi-member district
- Succeeded by: Multi-member district

Personal details
- Born: 1831 Breckinridge County, Kentucky, U.S.
- Died: November 14, 1882 (aged 50–51) Truckee, California, U.S.
- Party: Democratic
- Other political affiliations: Workingmen's (1879)
- Children: 3
- Occupation: Miner, newspaper publisher, lawyer, politician

Anderson Monroe Walker (1831 – November 14, 1882) was an American miner, newspaper publisher, lawyer and politician who served in the California State Assembly from 1880 to 1881. He also served as district attorney of Washoe County, Nevada, as justice of the peace in Truckee, California, and as one of California's oldest notaries public, serving in the last office for over 22 years.

In the Assembly, Walker introduced an anti-narcotics bill that would have placed controls on hemp drugs, which NORML activist Dale Gieringer noted "may well rank as the first anti-cannabis bill in the United States."
