= J. E. Clark (California politician) =

American politician (born circa 1836)

Member of the California State Assembly from the 7th district
- In office February 27, 1878 – January 5, 1880
- Preceded by: Clarence W. Upton
- Succeeded by: Multi-member district

Personal details
- Born: 1836 England
- Party: Democratic (before 1878); Workingmen's (1878–1880); Greenback (after 1880)
- Occupation: Carpenter, politician

J. E. Clark (born 1836) was an English American carpenter and politician who served in the California State Assembly from 1878 to 1880. He won a special election to fill the vacancy caused by the death of Assemblyman Clarence W. Upton, making him the first member of the Workingmen's Party of California elected to the State Assembly, and the second ever elected to public office after John W. Bones. He ran unsuccessfully for State Senate the following year.

Clark served as president of the Workingmen's Club in Gilroy, and belonged to the faction that supported affiliating with the Greenback-Labor Party. In 1880, he was an unsuccessful candidate for presidential elector, pledged to Greenbacker James B. Weaver. Clark later relocated to Humboldt County and was active in the party there, running once more for State Assembly unsuccessfully in 1884. By 1886 he had re-established his carpentry business in Scottsville.
