= Garrett Pickett =

American politician (1820s/30s–1897)

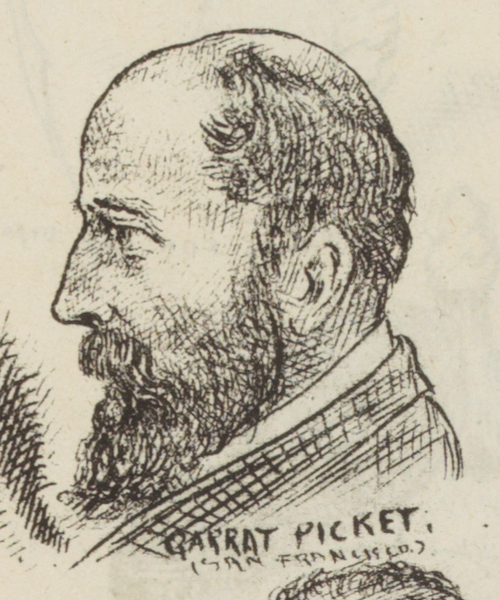
- Sketch by Carl Browne, 1880

Member of the California State Assembly from the 11th district
- In office January 5, 1880 – January 3, 1881
- Preceded by: Multi-member district
- Succeeded by: Multi-member district

Personal details
- Born: 1829 or 1831 County Cork, Ireland
- Died: October 23, 1897 (aged 68) San Francisco, California, U.S.
- Party: Democratic (before 1877, after 1881); Workingmen's (1877–1881)
- Spouse: Ellen (died 1889)
- Children: Mary; Lucy; Nellie; Garrett Jr.
- Occupation: Laborer, undertaker, politician

Garrett Pickett (1829 or 1831 – October 23, 1897) was an Irish American laborer, undertaker and politician who served in the California State Assembly from 1880 to 1881. Elected as a member of the Workingmen's Party of California, he previously ran for State Assembly in 1877 as a Democrat, and was later active in that party following the WPC's collapse.

He had four children with his wife Ellen, who died in 1889.
