= Jeremiah Levee =

American politician (1835–1908)

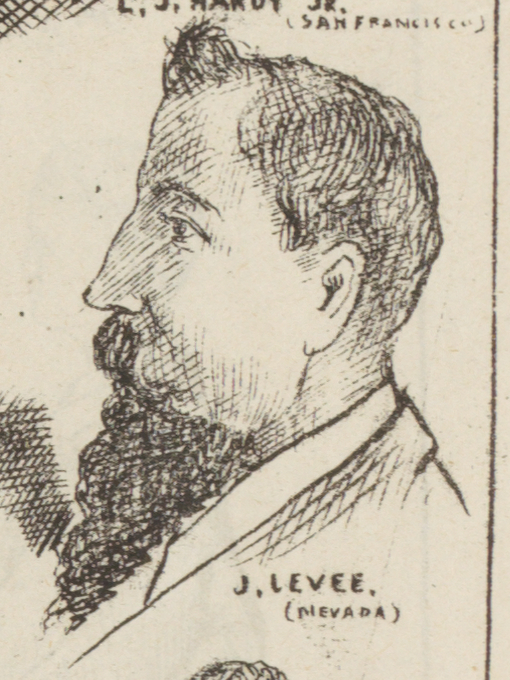
- Sketch by Carl Browne, 1880

Member of the California State Assembly from the 24th district
- In office January 5, 1880 – January 3, 1881
- Preceded by: Multi-member district
- Succeeded by: Multi-member district

Personal details
- Born: June 1835 Schoharie County, New York, U.S.
- Died: April 1, 1908 (aged 73) Nevada County, California, U.S.
- Party: Workingmen's
- Spouse: Emily Graves
- Children: 7
- Occupation: Miner, farmer, politician

Jeremiah Levee (June 1835 – April 1, 1908) was an American miner, farmer and politician who served in the California State Assembly from 1880 to 1881.
