= Tim O'Connor =

Tim or Timothy O'Connor may refer to:

- Tim O'Connor (actor) (1927–2018), actor, appeared in Peyton Place and General Hospital
- Tim O'Connor (theatre director) (born 1981), Australian playwright, theatre director and producer
- Tim O'Connor (American football) (born 1967), American college football coach
- Tim O'Connor (high jumper), American high jumper and winner at the USA Outdoor Track and Field Championships
- Tim O'Connor (skateboarder), skateboarder part of CKY Crew
- Tim O'Connor, blues musician whose songs appear in the film Dead Calm, see Billy Zane
- Timothy O'Connor (rugby union) (1860–1936), New Zealand rugby player and shot putter
- Tim O'Connor, headmaster of Auckland Grammar School, former rector of Palmerston North Boys' High School
- Timothy O'Connor (Irish politician) (1906–1986), Irish Fianna Fáil politician
- Joe O'Connor (referee) (Timothy Joseph O'Connor, 1892–1961), American boxing referee and Boston fire commissioner
- Timothy J. O'Connor (1936–2018), American politician in the Vermont House of Representatives
- Timothy O'Connor (California politician) (1847–1898), California state assemblyman
