= Charles W. Cross (California politician) =

American politician (1829–1889)

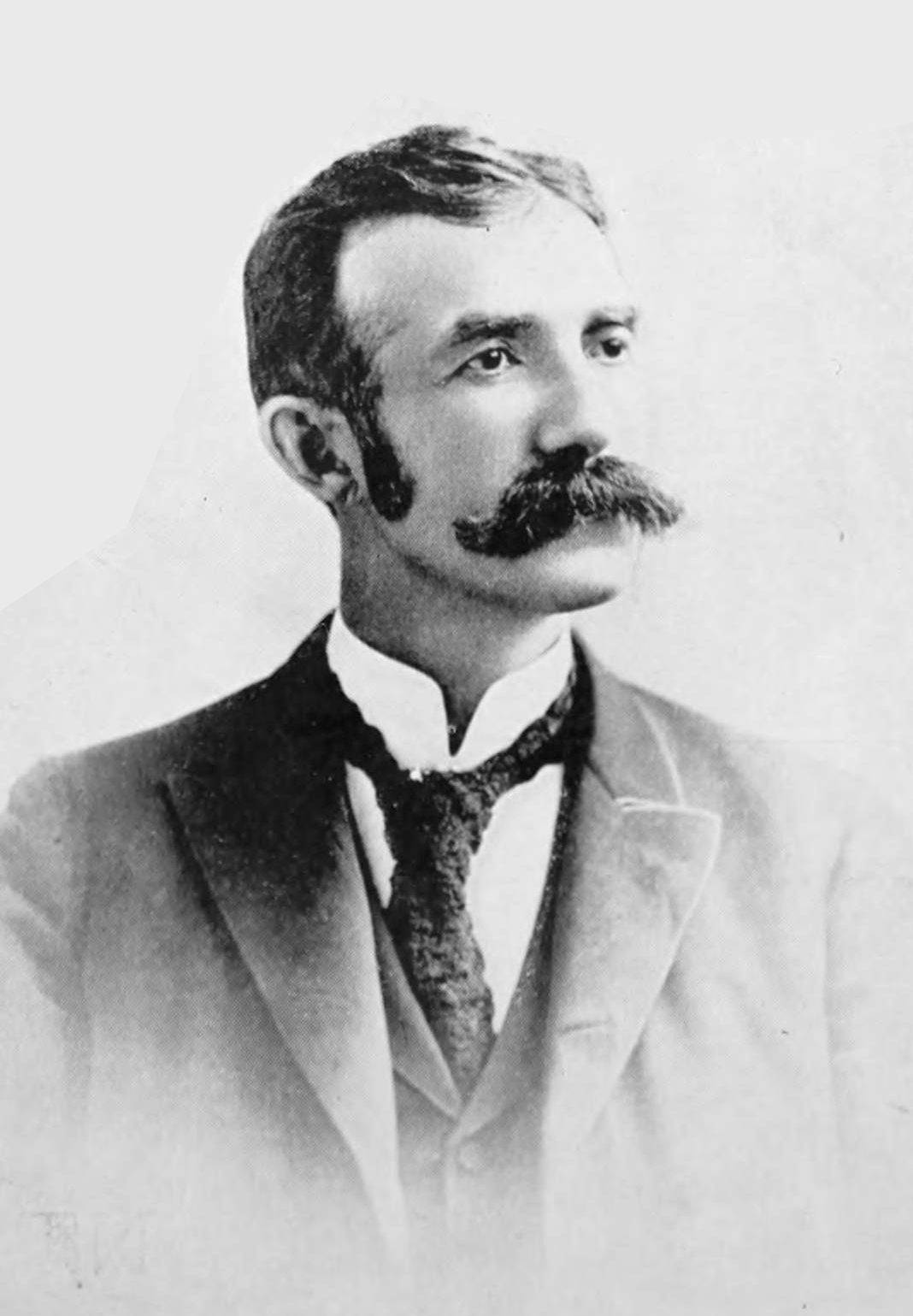
- Cross c. 1893

Member of the California Senate from the 24th district
- In office January 8, 1883 – January 3, 1887
- Preceded by: William George
- Succeeded by: P. J. Murphy

Delegate to the Second Constitutional Convention of California
- In office September 28, 1878 – March 3, 1879
- Preceded by: Office established
- Succeeded by: Office abolished
- Constituency: Nevada County

Personal details
- Born: May 28, 1848 Syracuse, New York, U.S.
- Died: May 22, 1924 (aged 75) Alameda, California, U.S.
- Party: Workingmen's (1878–1881); Democratic (after 1881)
- Spouse: Helen A. Allen (m. 1870)
- Children: Charles; Ernest; Clyde
- Education: Northwestern University
- Occupation: Schoolteacher, attorney, politician

Charles Wesley Cross (May 28, 1848 – May 22, 1924) was an American schoolteacher, attorney and politician who served as a delegate to California's Second Constitutional Convention from 1878 to 1879 and in the California State Senate from 1883 to 1887. He was the Workingmen's Party candidate for California Attorney General in 1879, coming in second place with 25% of the vote.

In the Senate, Cross served as chairman of the judiciary committee. According to one story, when a rival senator left a copy of a speech in his desk by accident, Cross carefully studied it and wrote a speech refuting it point-by-point. The next day, he delivered his speech first and humiliated his opponent.

Outside of politics, Cross was considered one of the state's leading attorneys, specializing in mining and corporate law. He managed and held interests in several mines himself, and supported the expansion of hydraulic mining. He was active in the California Miners' Association as early as 1892 and as late as 1909.

== Works ==
- "A Lawyer's Views". The Wave. VIII (4). San Francisco: 12–13. January 23, 1892.

== Sources ==
- "THE LEGISLATURE". The Sacramento Union. Sacramento. January 1, 1883.
- "OUR LEGISLATURE". The Sacramento Union. Sacramento. January 1, 1885.
