= Dennis Geary =

American politician (1831–1882)

Member of the California State Assembly from the 11th district
- In office January 3, 1881 – November 2, 1882
- Preceded by: Multi-member district
- Succeeded by: Multi-member district

Personal details
- Born: 1831 Fermoy, County Cork, Ireland
- Died: November 2, 1882 (aged 51) San Francisco, California, U.S.
- Party: Workingmen's
- Other political affiliations: Democratic (1880)
- Spouse: Elizabeth
- Occupation: Grocer, politician

Dennis Geary (1831 – November 2, 1882) was an Irish American grocer and politician who served in the California State Assembly from 1881 until his death in 1882. He was elected on a Workingmen's-Democratic Fusion ticket, and was previously an unsuccessful candidate for State Senate in 1879. He also served as president of the Irish American Benevolent Society in San Francisco.
