= Michael Lane (California politician) =

American politician (1840–1893)

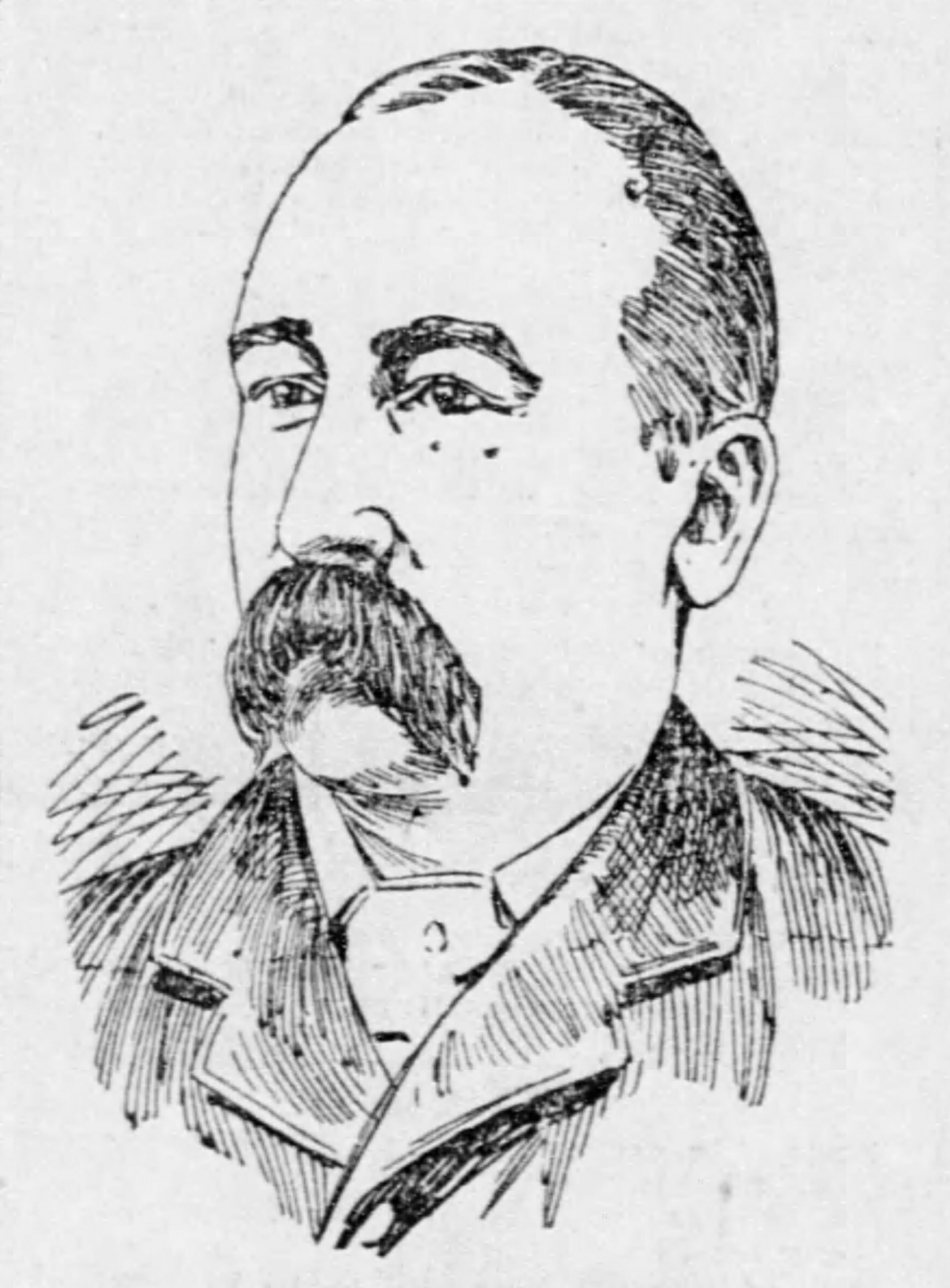
- Lane c. 1893

Member of the California State Assembly from the 12th district
- In office January 5, 1880 – January 8, 1883
- Preceded by: Multi-member district
- Succeeded by: Multi-member district

Personal details
- Born: 1840 Limerick, County Limerick, Ireland
- Died: September 10, 1893 (aged 56) San Francisco, California, U.S.
- Party: Democratic (before 1877, after 1881); Workingmen's (1877–1881)
- Occupation: Sailmaker, fireman, saloon keeper, merchant, politician

Military service
- Allegiance: United States
- Branch/service: United States Navy
- Years of service: 1861–1863
- Rank: Sail Maker's Mate
- Unit: USS Sabine, Atlantic Blockading Squadron
- Battles/wars: American Civil War; Battle of Hatteras Inlet Batteries; Battle of Port Royal

Michael Lane (1840 – September 10, 1893) was an Irish American sailmaker, fireman, saloon keeper, merchant and politician who served in the California State Assembly from 1880 to 1883. He was elected to his first term as a member of the Workingmen's Party of California and to his second on a Workingmen's-Democratic Fusion ticket. He entered politics as a member of the general committee of Mozart Hall, a breakaway faction of Tammany Hall led by New York City mayor Fernando Wood.

Lane served as a sail maker's mate on the USS Sabine during the Civil War, participating in the Battles of Hatteras Inlet Batteries and Port Royal. He was also involved in several rescue and blockading actions, and finished his tour on recruitment service. After his honorable discharge, he worked at the Washington and Brooklyn Navy Yards before moving to California in 1872.

== Illustration gallery ==
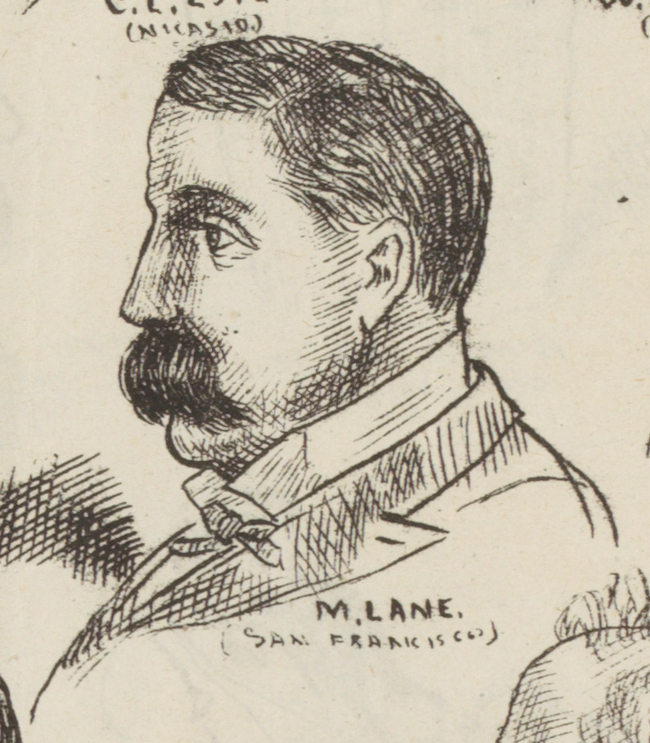
1880 sketch by Carl Browne

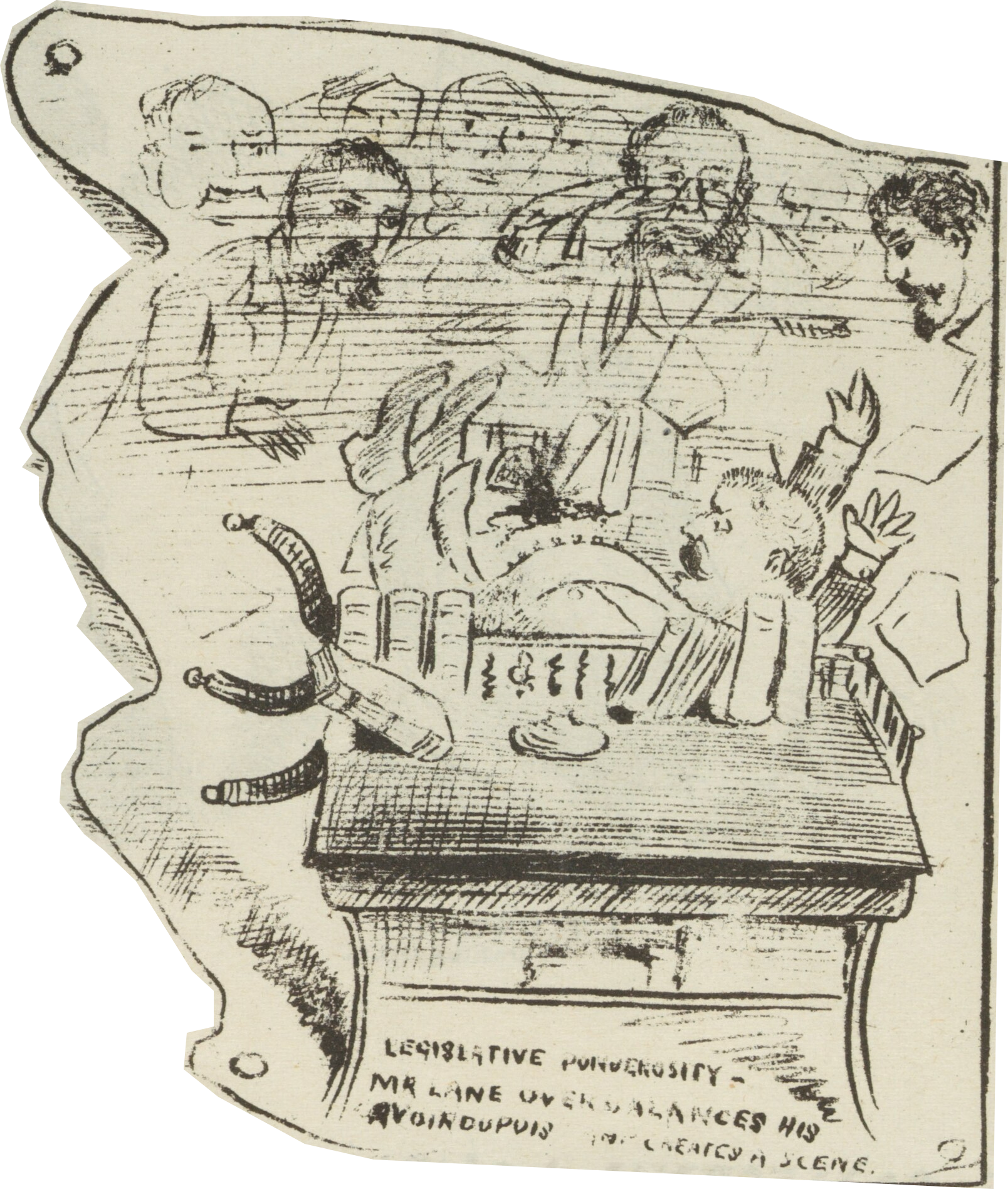
"Legislative Ponderosity"
