= Robert Desty =

Canadian-American politician

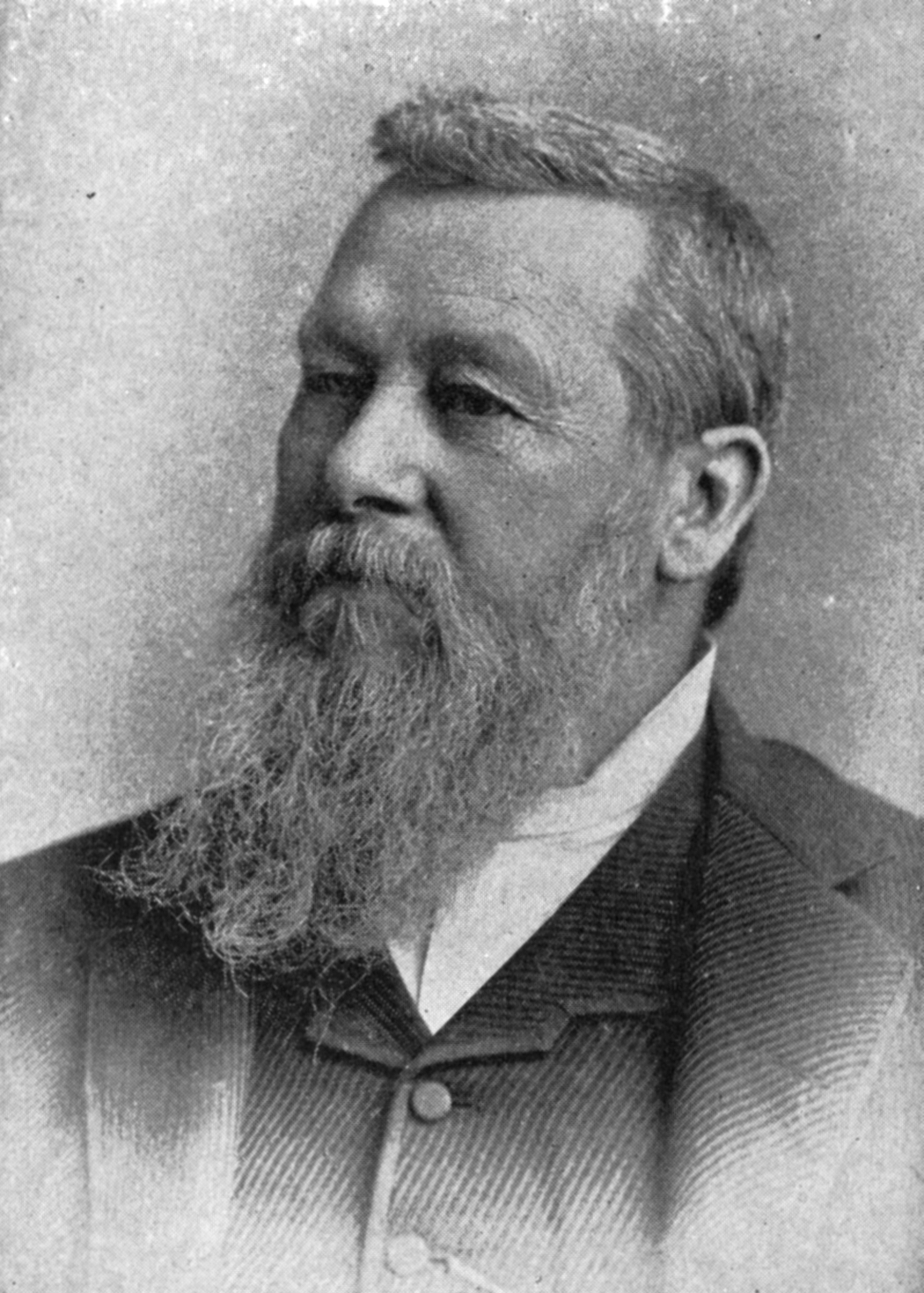

Member of the California Senate from the 8th district
- In office Not seated
- Preceded by: John C. Murphy
- Succeeded by: James D. Byrnes

Personal details
- Born: Robert d'Aillebout d'Estimauville de Beaumouchel; February 17, 1827 Quebec, Canada
- Died: September 27, 1895 (aged 68) Rochester, New York, U.S.
- Party: Workingmen's (1879)
- Spouse: Mary Davison (m. 1860)
- Children: 1
- Occupation: Lawyer, jurist

Military service
- Allegiance: United States
- Branch/service: United States Army
- Years of service: 1847
- Rank: Sergeant
- Battles/wars: Mexican–American War

Robert d'Aillebout d'Estimauville de Beaumouchel (February 17, 1827 – September 27, 1895), better known as Robert Desty, was a Canadian American lawyer and politician. He was elected to the California State Senate in 1879, (Note: Representing San Francisco and San Mateo Counties.) but was denied his seat on the grounds that he was not a naturalized citizen. He served in the United States Army during the Mexican–American War.
