= Thomas J. Pinder =

American politician (1849–1924)

Member of the California Senate from the 20th district
- In office January 3, 1887 – January 5, 1891
- Preceded by: Dennis Spencer
- Succeeded by: George H. Williams

Member of the California State Assembly from the 9th district
- In office January 3, 1881 – January 8, 1883
- Preceded by: Multi-member district
- Succeeded by: Multi-member district

Personal details
- Born: 1849 Meriden, Connecticut, U.S.
- Died: January 2, 1924 (aged 74–75) San Francisco, California, U.S.
- Party: Democratic (before 1877, after 1881); Workingmen's (1877–1881)
- Occupation: Silversmith, politician

Thomas James Pinder (1849 – January 2, 1924) was an American silversmith and politician who served in the California State Assembly from 1881 to 1883 and the California State Senate from 1887 to 1891. He was elected to the former body on a Workingmen's-Democratic Fusion ticket and to the latter as a Democrat. He first ran for State Senate on the Workingmen's ticket in 1879, losing by just 89 votes.

During his 1886 State Senate run, fellow ex-Workingman Samuel Braunhart wrote a letter to the editor of the San Francisco Examiner eulogizing Pinder as follows:

Thomas J. Pinder, the Democratic candidate for Senator from the Twentieth Senatorial District, is entitled to receive his full party vote, as well as of all good citizens who believe in the doctrine of fair play, a fair count, and an honest vote. It is a matter of notoriety that Thomas J. Pinder was fairly elected from the old Ninth District to the Senate in 1879. There are a number of residents of San Francisco who know that the electors of that district were cheated out of their choice, unparalleled for brazenness and unmitigated fraud anywhere, not even in Louisiana during the carpet-bag regime. Mr. Pinder—nay, Senator Pinder—though but a poor mechanic, made a noble and gallant fight for what he deemed to be the outraged rights of his constituency before the Senate Committee on Elections, and indelibly stamped fraud upon the foreheads of corporation Republicans. The evidence was plain and to the point, a network of infamy wove itself around them, and when a demand was made for the recounting of the ballots (a perfectly fair and honest proposition), the Republicans on that committee prevented the recount being made. Thus was the infamy consummated, the people betrayed, and a man seated who was not the choice of the people from the Ninth District. The people of a portion of that district, at last, have the opportunity of vindicating their right to elect the man of their selection. Justice is often tardy, but retribution seldom fails to assert itself at the proper time.

— Samuel Braunhart, to the Editor of the Examiner, October 21, 1886
