= Workingmen's Party of California =

American labor organization (1877–1881)

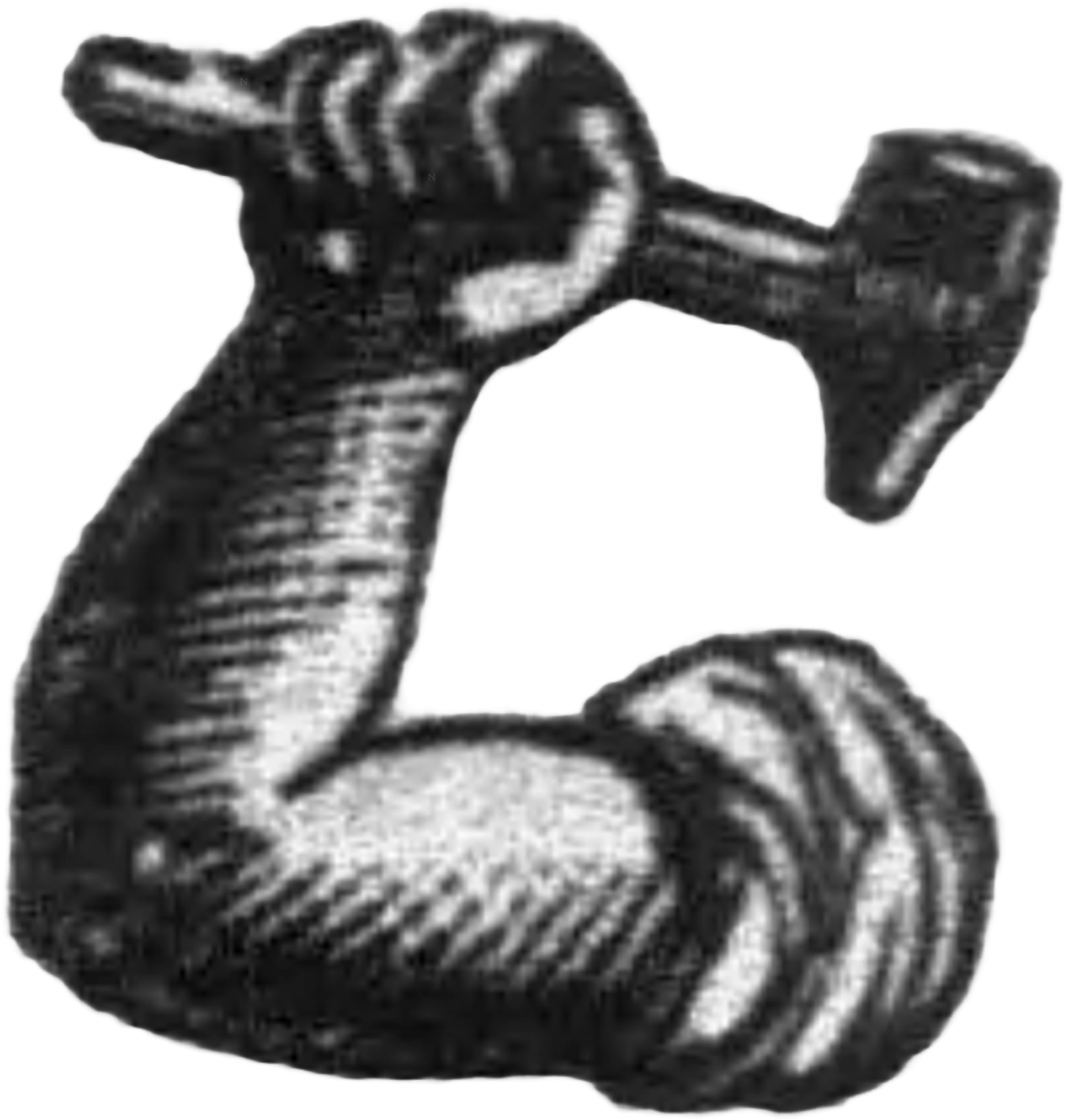
- Abbreviation: WPC
- Leader: Denis Kearney
- Founded: October 5, 1877; 149 years ago
- Dissolved: c. October 1881; 145 years ago
- Headquarters: Charter Oak Hall, San Francisco, California, U.S.
- Newspaper: Daily Sand Lot
- Membership: 15,000 (in San Francisco)
- Ideology: Anti-Chinese racism Anti-monopolism; Factions: Laborism; Socialism
- Political position: Left-wing
- Slogan: "The Chinese must go!"

The Workingmen's Party of California (WPC) was an American labor organization and political party, founded in 1877 and led by Denis Kearney. Remembered primarily for its anti-Chinese racism, the party's famous slogan was "The Chinese must go!"

== Organizational history ==
Denis Kearney, founder of the Workingmen's Party of California

As a result of heavy unemployment from the Long Depression, Sand Lot rallies erupted in San Francisco that led to the Party's formation in 1877. In 1878, the party won 51 out of 152 delegates to California's Second Constitutional Convention (the most of any organized party), rewriting the state constitution to deny Chinese Americans voting rights in California. The most important part of the constitution included the formation of a California Railroad Commission that would oversee the activities of the Central Pacific Railroad run by Crocker, Huntington, Hopkins and Stanford. In 1879, the party won 10 seats in the State Senate and 16 in the State Assembly. (Note: Some sources give the number as 11 seats in the State Senate and 17 in the State Assembly. See the lists of members and endorsees for a detailed account.)

The party's goal was to "rid the country of Chinese cheap labor," taking aim against Chinese emigrants and the railroad companies that employed them. Kearney's attacks against the Chinese were of a particularly virulent and openly racist nature, and found considerable support among working-class Californians of the time. Ironically, the party's strongest supporters were immigrants themselves; a majority of party members were Irish-born, with dedicated German, French, Swiss-Italian, Scandinavian and Spanish clubs. The party even attempted to organize the city's black community.

Following the 1879 elections, the party began to decline in power and influence as its elected officials, stonewalled by their opponents and mostly inexperienced themselves, were unable to fulfill their bold campaign promises. In 1880, the party was torn apart by one faction seeking to affiliate with the Democratic Party and another seeking to affiliate with the Greenback-Labor Party. By October 1881, the Workingmen's Party had effectively ceased to exist. The next year, Congress passed the Chinese Exclusion Act.

== Relation to the WPUS ==
Kearney's party should not be confused with the Workingmen's Party of the United States (WPUS), which was mostly based in the Eastern United States. The branches of the Workingmen's Party of the United States located in California were absorbed into the Workingmen's Party of California after "practically all members" of the former abandoned it for the latter, which was growing at a rapid rate and had adopted similar language. One such member was Charles J. Beerstecher, elected to the Railroad Commission in 1879, who originally headed the German language section of the WPUS in San Francisco.

== Members ==
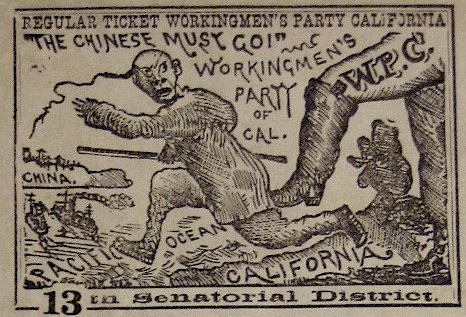
Organization ticket

=== City officials ===
- Denis Kearney, Party President
- John G. Day, Party Vice President
- William Wellock, Party Vice President
- John T. Condon, Party Vice President
- H. L. Knight, Party Secretary
- J. J. Flynn, Party Secretary
- Thomas Donnelly, Party Treasurer
- Anthony Fischer, German Workingmen's Club President, candidate for Recorder of San Francisco (1879), attempted assassin of Charles J. Beerstecher
- Isaac Smith Kalloch, Mayor of San Francisco (1879–1881)
- Washburne R. Andrus, Mayor of Oakland (1878–1880), candidate for Lieutenant Governor (1879)
- William Jefferson Hunsaker, Mayor of San Diego (1888)
- Abel Whitton, President of the Berkeley Board of Trustees (1878–1881)
- John F. Godfrey, Los Angeles City Attorney (1876–1880)
- John P. Dunn, Auditor of San Francisco (1879–1881), Controller of California (1883–1891)
- Cayetano Apablasa, Los Angeles Common Councilman (1877–1878), candidate for State Senate (1880)
- John Tracy Gaffey, Undersheriff of Santa Cruz County (1880–1883), member of the California State Board of Equalization (1887–1891)

=== State officials ===
- James J. Ayers, Delegate to the Second Constitutional Convention (1878–1879), candidate for U.S. Representative (1879), California State Printer (1883–1887)
- Clitus Barbour, Delegate to the Second Constitutional Convention (1878–1879), candidate for U.S. Representative (1879)
- Charles W. Cross, Delegate to the Second Constitutional Convention (1878–1879), candidate for California Attorney General (1879), California State Senator (1883–1887) (elected as a Democrat)
- C. C. O'Donnell, Delegate to the Second Constitutional Convention (1878–1879), Coroner of San Francisco (1885–1887) (elected as an Independent)
- William F. White, Delegate to the Second Constitutional Convention (1878–1879), candidate for Governor of California (1879), California Bank Commissioner (1879–1887)
- Charles J. Beerstecher, Delegate to the Second Constitutional Convention (1878–1879), California Rail Commissioner (1880–1883)
- John W. Bones, California State Senator (1878–1880)
- John P. West, Delegate to the Second Constitutional Convention (1878–1879), California State Senator (1880–1883)
- Warren Chase, California State Senator (1880–1883)
- Robert Desty, California State Senator-elect (1880, not seated)
- Charles C. Conger, California State Senator (1880–1883)
- Thomas Kane, California State Senator (1880–1883)
- Thorwald Klaudius Nelson, Delegate to the Second Constitutional Convention (1878–1879), California State Senator (1880–1885)
- Joseph C. Gorman, Delegate to the Second Constitutional Convention (1878–1879), California State Senator (1880–1883)
- Martin Kelly, California State Senator (1880–1887)
- John S. Enos, California State Senator (1880–1883), Commissioner of the California Bureau of Labor Statistics (1883–1887)
- Pierce H. Ryan, California State Senator (1880–1885)
- J. E. Clark, California State Assemblyman (1878–1880)
- Elihu Anthony, California State Assemblyman (1880–1881)
- William W. Cuthbert, California State Assemblyman (1880–1881)
- Stephen J. Garibaldi, California State Assemblyman (1880–1881)
- William J. Sinon, California State Assemblyman (1880–1881, 1883–1885) (elected as a Democrat)
- Samuel Braunhart, California State Assemblyman (1880–1881), California State Senator (1897–1900), Member of the San Francisco Board of Supervisors (1900–1906) (elected as a Democrat)
- A. B. Maguire, California State Assemblyman (1880–1881), Member of the San Francisco Board of Supervisors (1900) (elected as a Democrat)
- John J. McCallion, California State Assemblyman (1880–1883)
- Jeremiah J. McCarthy, California State Assemblyman (1880–1881)
- Garrett Pickett, California State Assemblyman (1880–1881)
- John Burns, California State Assemblyman (1880–1883)
- Patrick T. Gaffey, California State Assemblyman (1880–1881)
- Michael Lane, California State Assemblyman (1880–1883)
- John J. McDade, California State Assemblyman (1880–1881), Sheriff of San Francisco (1893–1895)
- Stephen Maybell, California State Assemblyman (1880–1881)
- Jeremiah Levee, California State Assemblyman (1880–1881)
- Anderson M. Walker, California State Assemblyman (1880–1881)
- Timothy O'Connor, California State Assemblyman (1881–1883)
- Thomas J. Pinder, California State Assemblyman (1881–1883), California State Senator (1887–1891) (elected as a Democrat)
- Dennis Geary, California State Assemblyman (1881–1882)
- William J. Gavigan, California State Assemblyman (1881–1883)
- Horace J. Jackson, California State Assemblyman (1881–1883)

=== Other members ===
- Philip Alexander Bell, editor of The Elevator
- Carl Browne, cartoonist
- Henry George, economist
- Con Mooney, orator and namesake of Mooneysville-by-the-Sea
- James H. Roxburgh, pressman and amateur baseball player

== Endorsees ==
=== City officials ===
- James R. Toberman, Mayor of Los Angeles (1872–1874, 1878–1882) (elected as a Democrat)
- Robert Howe, candidate for Mayor of San Francisco (1881) (ran as a Democrat)

=== State officials ===
- Robert F. Morrison, Chief Justice of the California Supreme Court (1879–1887) (elected as a Democrat)
- Elisha W. McKinstry, Associate Justice of the California Supreme Court (1874–1888) (elected as a Democrat)
- Erskine Mayo Ross, Associate Justice of the California Supreme Court (1880–1886) (elected as a Democrat)
- Samuel B. McKee, Associate Justice of the California Supreme Court (1880–1887) (elected as a Democrat)
- James D. Thornton, Associate Justice of the California Supreme Court (1880–1891) (elected as a Democrat)
- John Sharpstein, Associate Justice of the California Supreme Court (1880–1892) (elected as a Democrat)
- George Stoneman, California Rail Commissioner (1880–1883), Governor of California (1883–1887) (elected as a Democrat)
- William J. Hill, California State Senator (1880–1883) (elected as a Republican)

=== Federal officials ===
- John R. Glascock, candidate for U.S. Representative (1880), U.S. Representative (1883–1885) (elected as a Democrat)
- James G. Maguire, California State Assemblyman (1875–1877), San Francisco County Superior Court Judge (1882–1888), U.S. Representative (1893–1899) (elected as a Democrat)

== See also ==
- San Francisco riot of 1877
- Chinese Exclusion Act
- Sigismund Danielewicz
- Burnette Haskell
- Wong Chin Foo
- John P. Irish
- Frederick Bee
