= John W. Bones =

American politician (1818–1901)

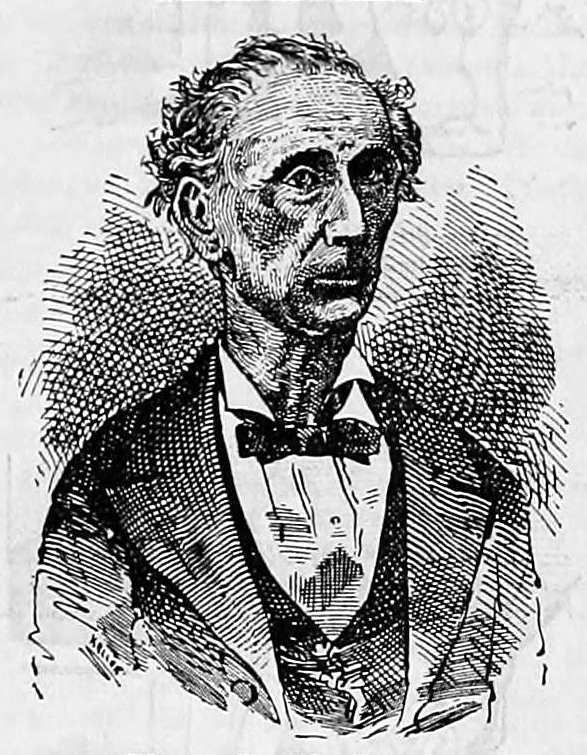
- Portrait by George Frederick Keller, 1878

Member of the California Senate from the 14th district
- In office January 30, 1878 – January 5, 1880
- Preceded by: Nathan Porter
- Succeeded by: Multi-member district

Personal details
- Born: September 1, 1818 Valley Forge, Pennsylvania, U.S.
- Died: July 30, 1901 (aged 82) Oakland, California, U.S.
- Party: Republican
- Other political affiliations: Workingmen's (1878)
- Spouse: Anna Maria West (m. 1846; died 1886)
- Children: Mary; William; Samuel
- Occupation: Carpenter, architect, politician

John Wesley Bones (September 1, 1818 – July 30, 1901) was an American carpenter, architect, and politician who served in the California State Senate from 1878 to 1880. He won a special election to fill the vacancy caused by the death of Senator Nathan Porter, making him the first member of the Workingmen's Party of California ever elected to public office. He became known for his independent voting record and was expelled from the party for refusing to follow its line, leading to threats of lynching.

Bones was a member of the San Francisco Committee of Vigilance in 1856. He spent most of his life in Alameda, including the time he spent serving in the State Senate. He also lived in Fresno for a time and designed multiple buildings there, including the Ogle House, the Grand Central Hotel, the Masonic Temple, the Fiske Block and the City Hall.

== Caricature gallery ==
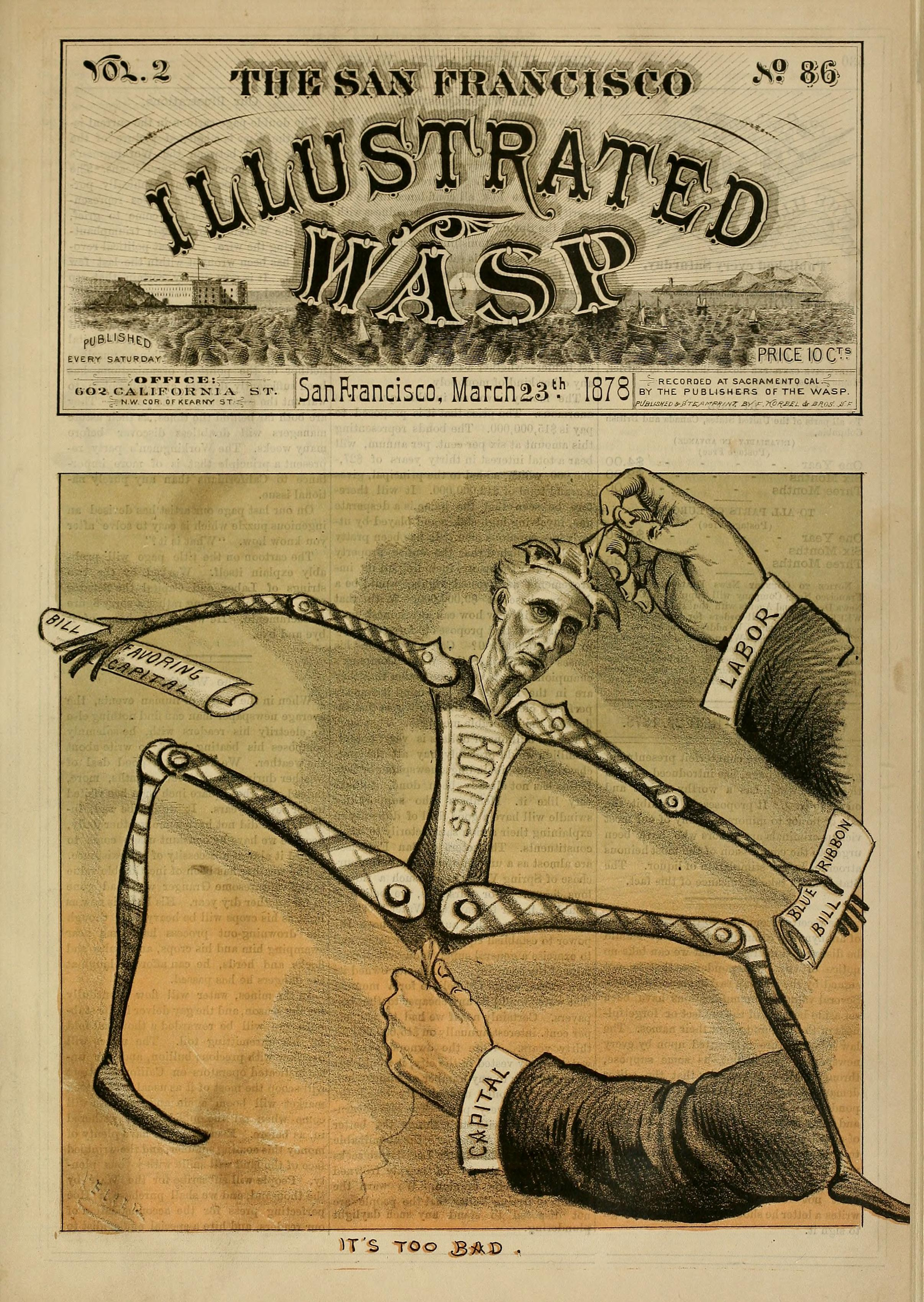
"It's Too Bad"

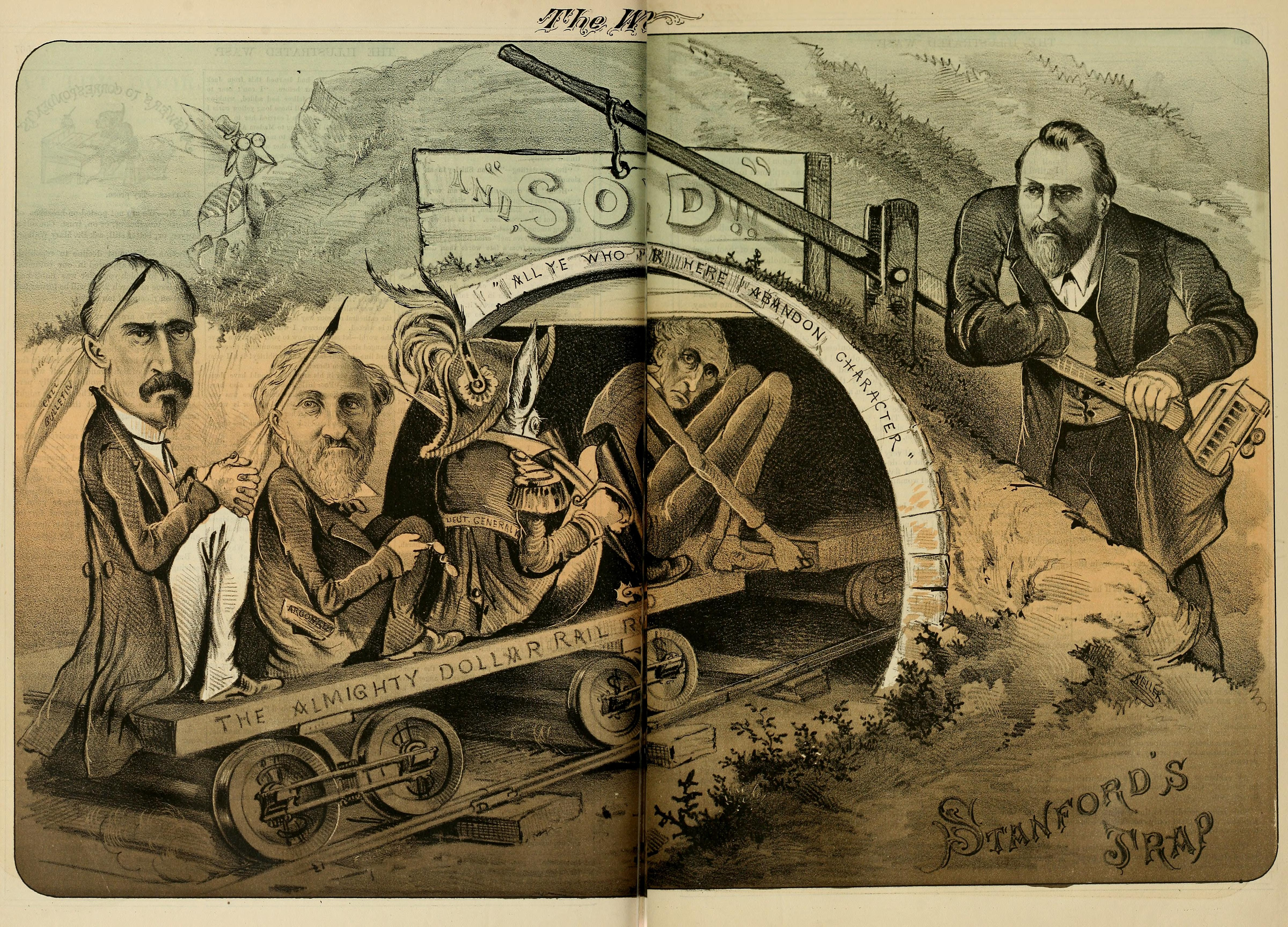
"Stanford's Trap"

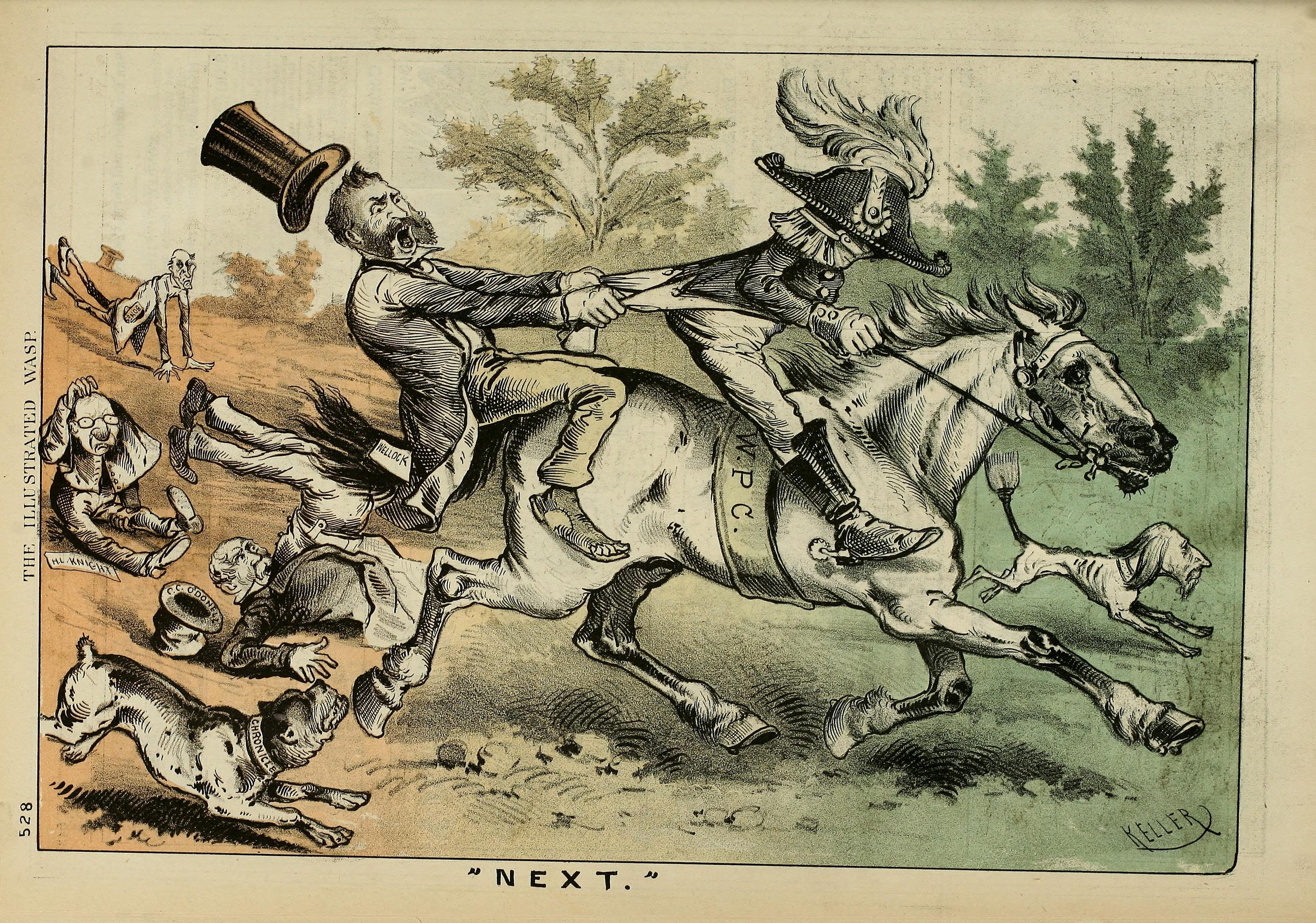
"Next"
