= Mick Lane (hurler) =

Irish hurler

Personal information
- Native name: Mícheál Ó Laighin (Irish)
- Born: 1942 (age 83–84) Blackpool, Cork, Ireland

Sport
- Sport: Hurling
- Position: Right corner-back
Club
- Years: Club
- Glen Rovers
Club titles
- Cork titles: 3
- Munster titles: 1
Inter-county*
Years	County	Apps (scores)
1966	Cork	0 (0-00)
Inter-county titles
- Munster titles: 0
- All-Irelands: 0
- NHL: 0
- *Inter County team apps and scores correct as of 16:11, 22 December 2014.

Michael Lane (born 1942) is an Irish retired hurler who played as a right corner-back for the Cork senior team.

Born in Blackpool, Lane first arrived on the inter-county scene at the age of seventeen when he first linked up with the Cork minor team. He joined the senior panel during the 1966 championship. Lane went on to enjoy a brief career with Cork, and won one All-Ireland medal and one Munster medal as a non-playing substitute.

At club level Lane is a one-time Munster medallist with Glen Rovers. In addition to this he also won several championship medals.

== Honours ==
=== Player ===
Glen Rovers

- Munster Senior Club Hurling Championship (1): 1964

Cork

- All-Ireland Senior Hurling Championship (1): 1966 (sub)
- Munster Senior Hurling Championship (1): 1966 (sub)
