= Thomas Kane (California politician) =

American politician (1835–1905)

- Illustration published in The Wasp, 1886

Member of the California Senate from the 11th district
- In office January 5, 1880 – January 8, 1883
- Preceded by: John S. Boyston
- Succeeded by: Multi-member district

Personal details
- Born: 1832 or 1835 County Donegal, Ireland
- Died: November 6, 1905 (aged 70) Los Angeles, California, U.S.
- Party: Workingmen's (before 1881); Republican (after 1881)
- Children: 3
- Occupation: Coal miner, politician

Thomas Kane (1832 or 1835 – November 6, 1905) was an Irish American coal miner and politician who served in the California State Senate from 1880 to 1883. Elected as a member of the Workingmen's Party of California, he remained active in the anti-Chinese movement even after leaving office and joining the Republican Party.

On April 6, 1880, Kane charged that a lobbyist attempted to bribe him to vote for an upcoming bill. The Senate opened an investigation the next day, but during testimony Kane "absolutely refuse[d]" to name the party responsible. He was found in contempt of the Senate and was threatened with expulsion, but was instead jailed for a single night.
