= John P. Dunn =

American politician (1852–1906)

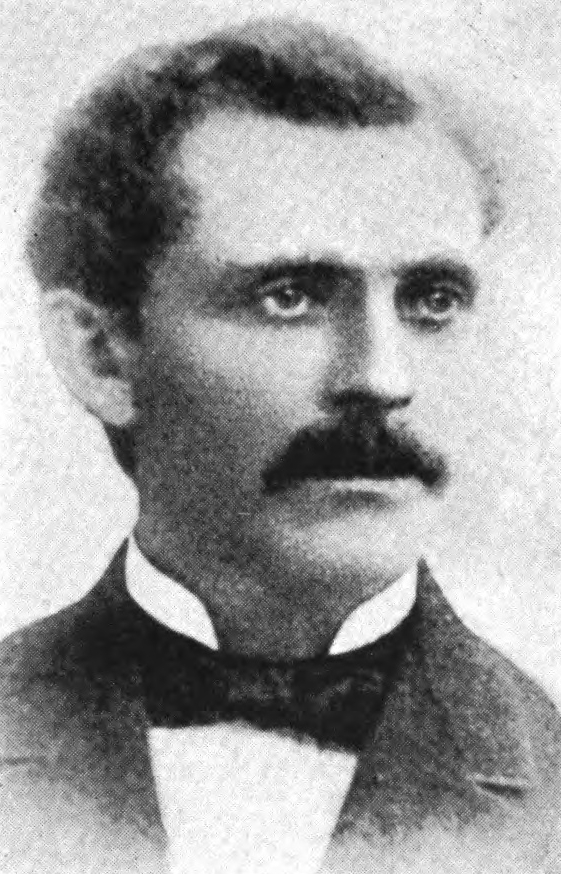
- Dunn c. 1880s

17th Controller of California
- In office January 10, 1883 – January 8, 1891
- Governor: George Stoneman; Washington Bartlett; Robert Waterman
- Preceded by: Daniel M. Kenfield
- Succeeded by: Edward P. Colgan

Auditor of San Francisco
- In office November 14, 1879 – December 4, 1881
- Preceded by: Colin M. Boyd
- Succeeded by: Henry Brickwedel

Personal details
- Born: April 11, 1852 Ireland
- Died: May 29, 1906 (aged 54) Monrovia, California, U.S.
- Party: Workingmen's (before 1881); Democratic (after 1881)
- Spouse: Mary Mahoney (m. 1880)
- Children: Walter; May; John Jr.; Theresa
- Education: Cornell University; Our Lady of Angels Seminary
- Occupation: Clerk, merchant, politician

John Patrick Dunn (April 11, 1852 – May 29, 1906) was an Irish American clerk, merchant and politician who served as auditor of San Francisco from 1879 to 1881 and as the 17th controller of California from 1883 to 1891. He was the last Democrat to hold the latter office until the election of Alan Cranston in 1958.

== Political career ==
Dunn entered politics as a member of the Workingmen's Party of California, serving as secretary of their first state convention in 1878. He was elected auditor of San Francisco the following year and was allowed to take office a month early due to the death of previous auditor George F. Maynard. According to the San Francisco Chronicle, Dunn became a naturalized citizen just 23 days before the election.

During his tenure, Dunn was criticized for hiring relatives but praised for his otherwise strong opposition to corruption. He ran for reelection two years later on a Democratic-Workingmen's-Citizen's Taxpayers Fusion ticket, but was defeated in the face of opposition from the Spring Valley Water and San Francisco Gas Companies.

In 1882, Dunn was elected California State Controller with 53% of the vote. He was reelected four years later by a margin of 636 votes, and was defeated for a third term in 1890. During his tenure, he was again praised for his "sterling honesty," accusing Secretary of State Daniel M. Burns of graft and securing thousands of dollars for the state from tax evaders.

Dunn was later appointed register of the San Francisco Land Office by president Grover Cleveland, serving from 1894 to 1898. He was an unsuccessful candidate for the State Board of Equalization in 1898, losing by just 4% of the vote. That December, San Francisco Mayor James D. Phelan nominated him for the office of Gas Inspector, but he was rejected by the Board of Supervisors.

== Personal life ==
Dunn's eldest son, Walter, served as president of the Monrovia Board of Trustees from 1916 to 1924. His other son, John Jr., served as city attorney of Monrovia from 1916 to 1924. His granddaughter, Maryalice Lemmon, served as secretary to governor Pat Brown.

== Caricature gallery ==
"That Useless Tail"

"The Ideal and the Real"

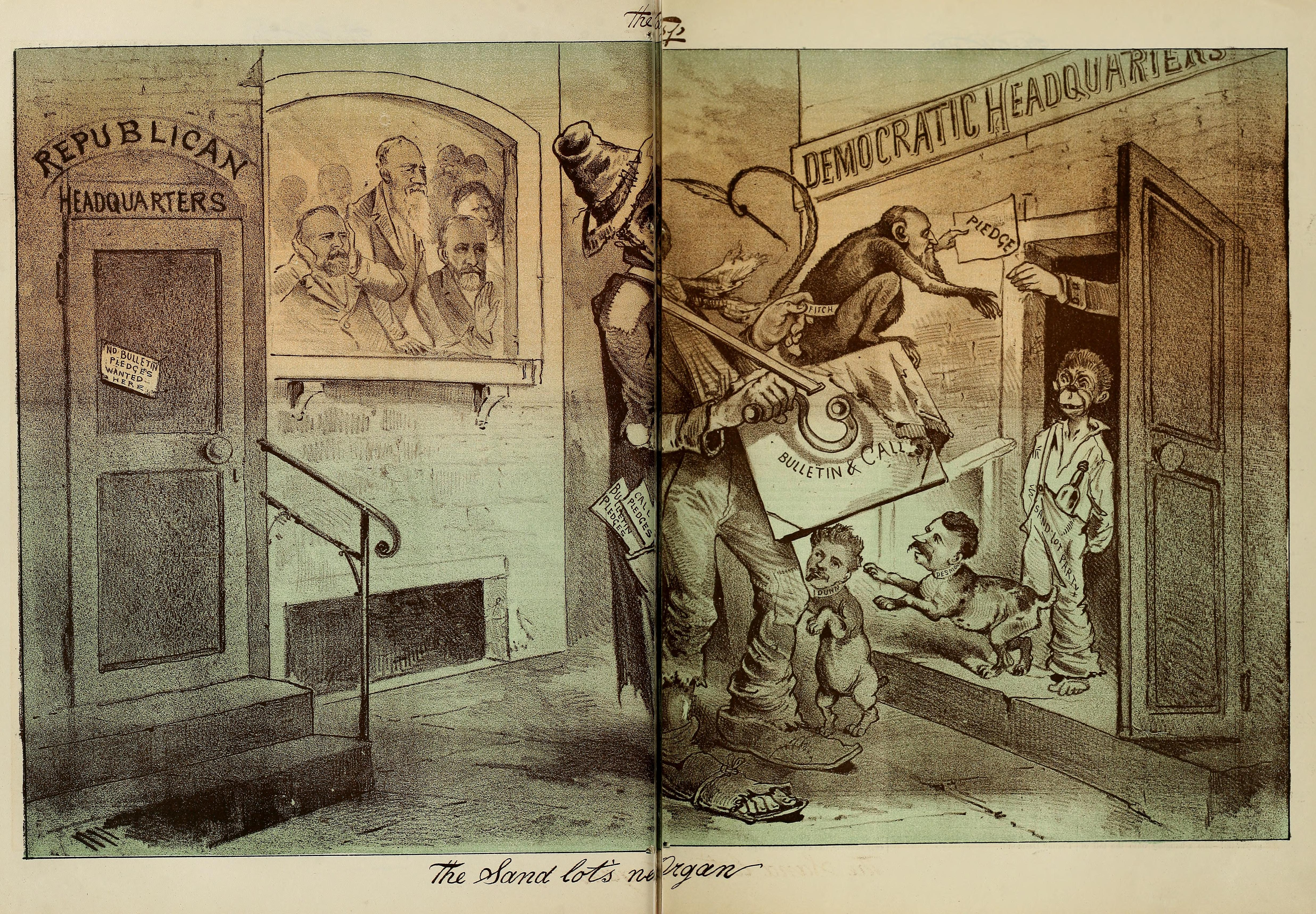
"The Sand Lot's New Organ"

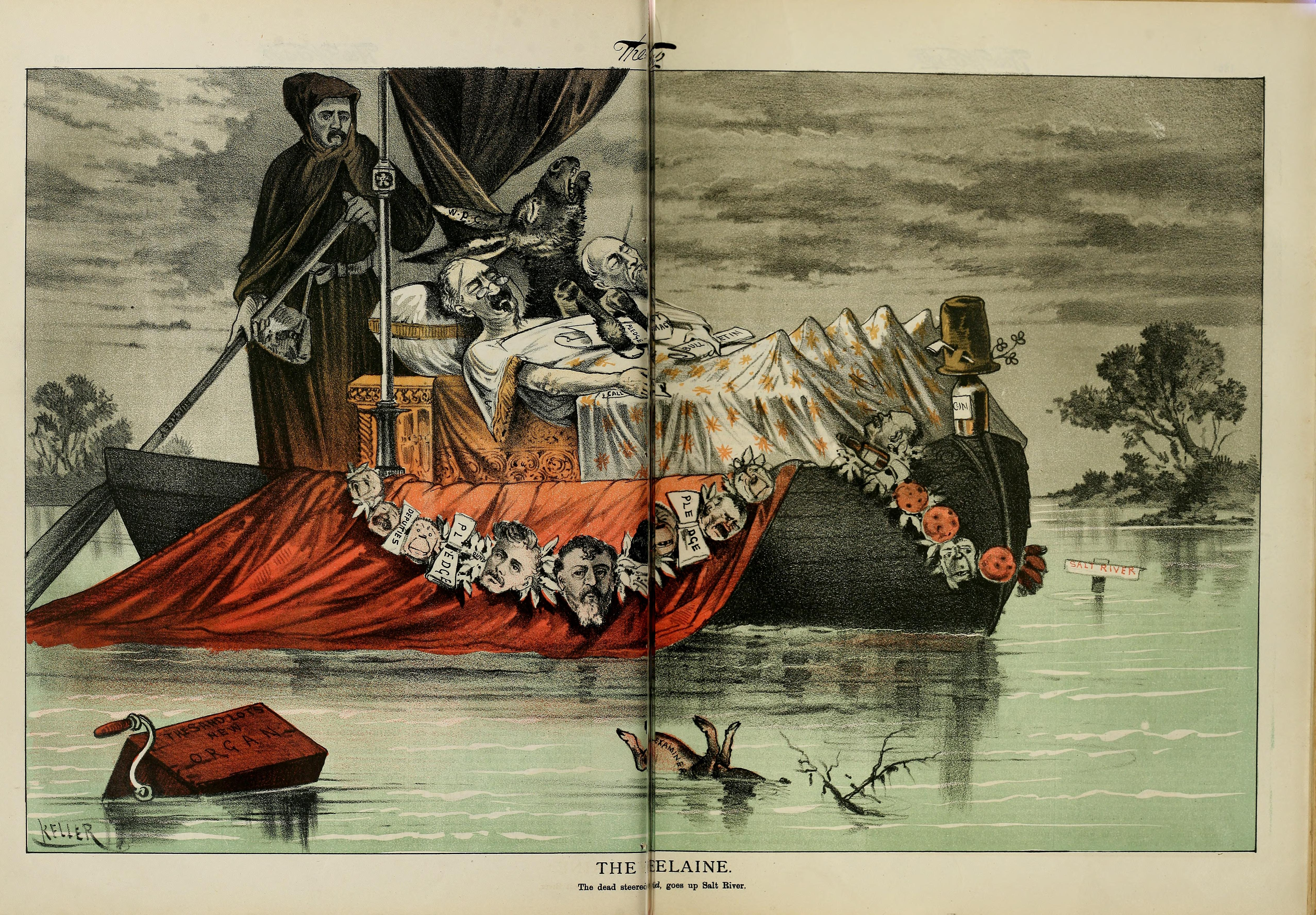
"The Elaine"

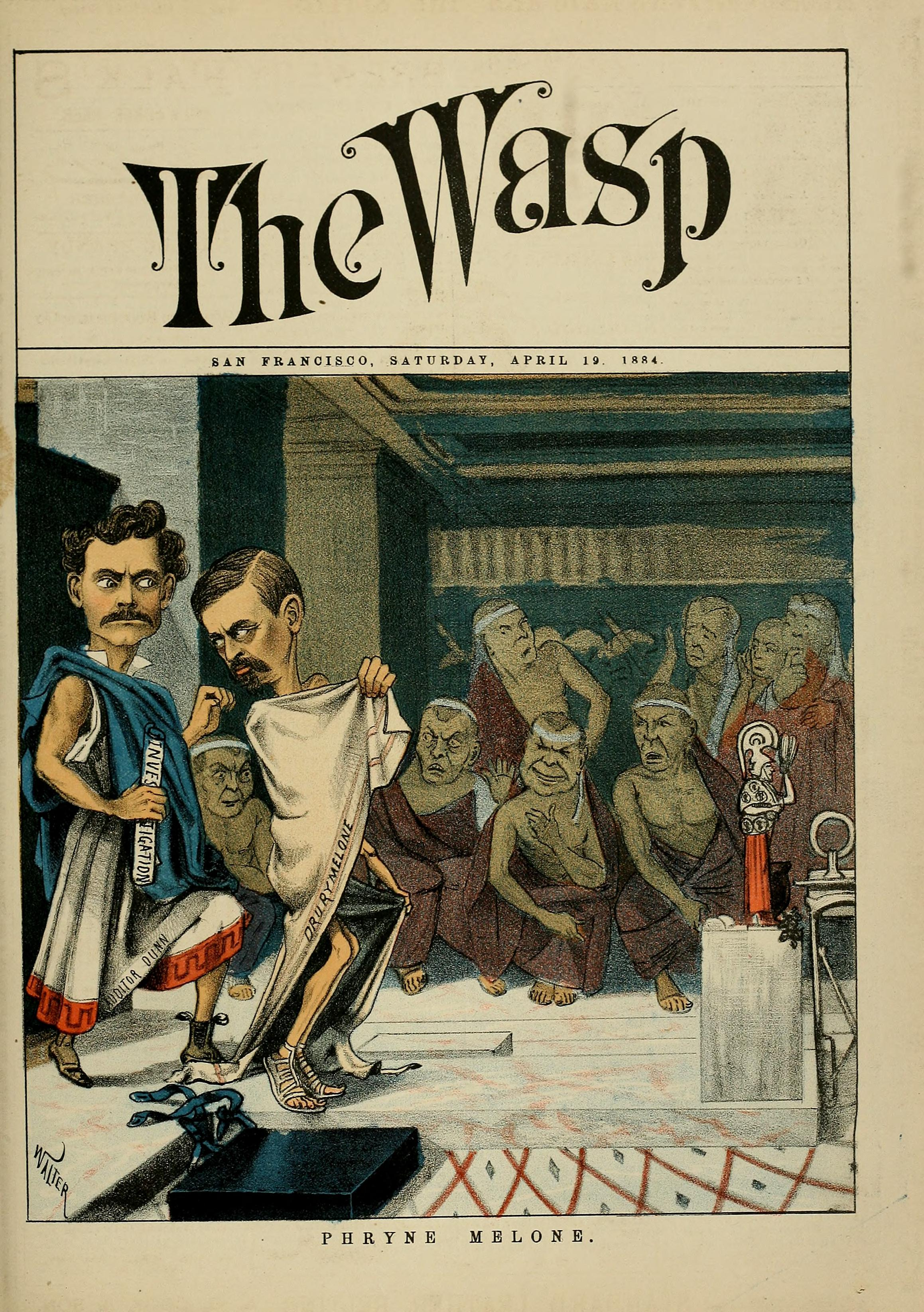
"Phryne Melone"

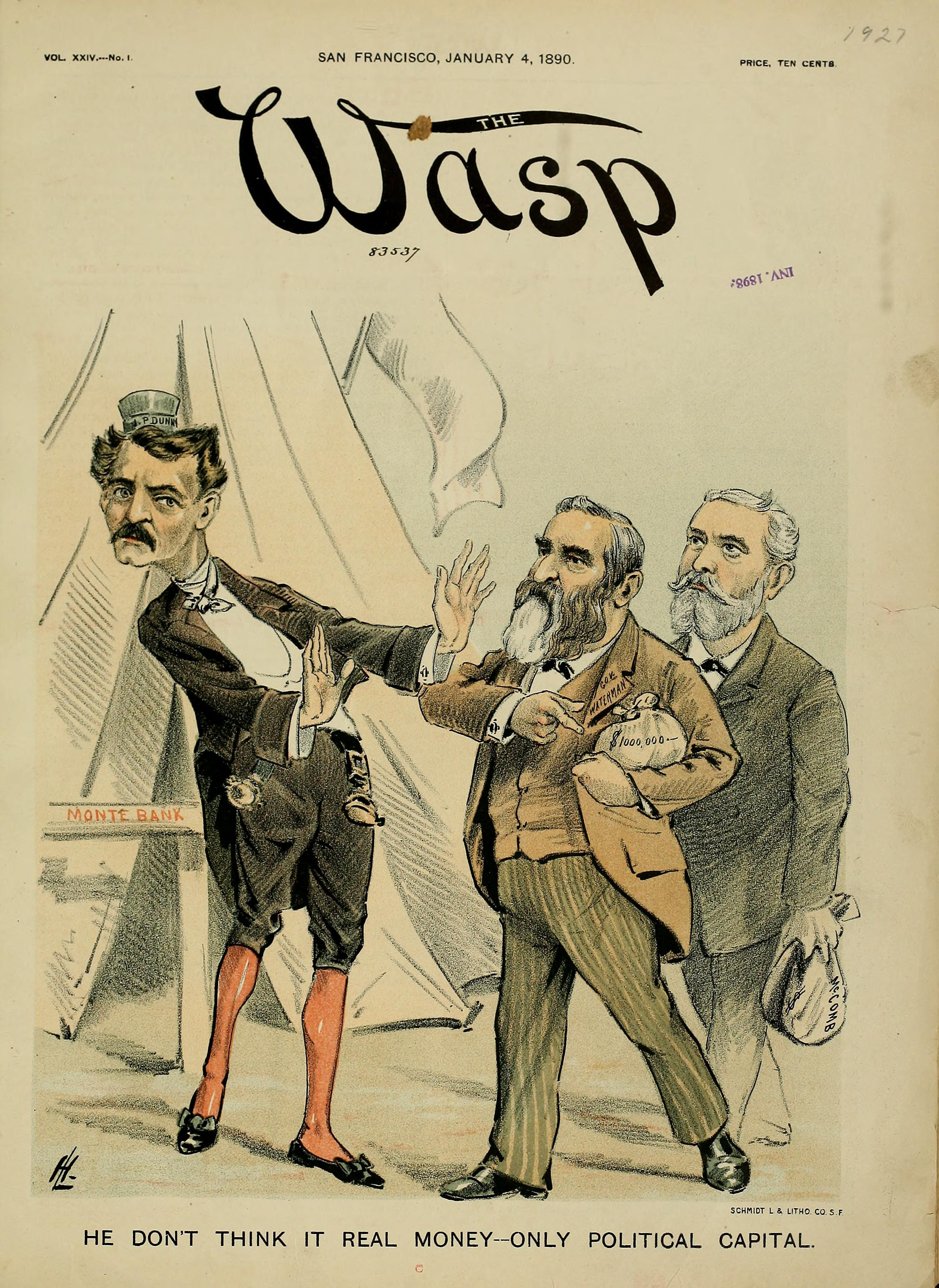
"He Don't Think It Real Money—Only Political Capital"

== Sources ==
- "Eleventh Ward Workingmen". San Francisco Chronicle. San Francisco. December 5, 1877.
- "THE WORKINGMEN'S CANDIDATES". The Daily Examiner. San Francisco. November 7, 1879.
