= Timothy O'Connor (California politician) =

American politician (1847–1898)

Member of the California State Assembly from the 9th district
- In office January 3, 1881 – January 8, 1883
- Preceded by: Multi-member district
- Succeeded by: Multi-member district

Personal details
- Born: 1847 Australia
- Died: March 29, 1898 (aged 50) San Francisco, California, U.S.
- Party: Workingmen's (before 1881); Democratic (after 1881)
- Spouse: Martha
- Children: John; Blanch; Erin
- Occupation: Ship caulker, collector, politician

Timothy O'Connor (1847 – March 29, 1898) was an Australian American ship caulker, collector and politician who served in the California State Assembly from 1881 to 1883. He was elected on a Workingmen's-Democratic Fusion ticket, and was previously an unsuccessful candidate for the San Francisco Board of Supervisors in 1879.

== Sources ==
- "THE WORKINGMEN". The Morning Call. San Francisco. June 4, 1879.
