= California Constitutional Conventions =

Two 19th-century state conventions in the United States

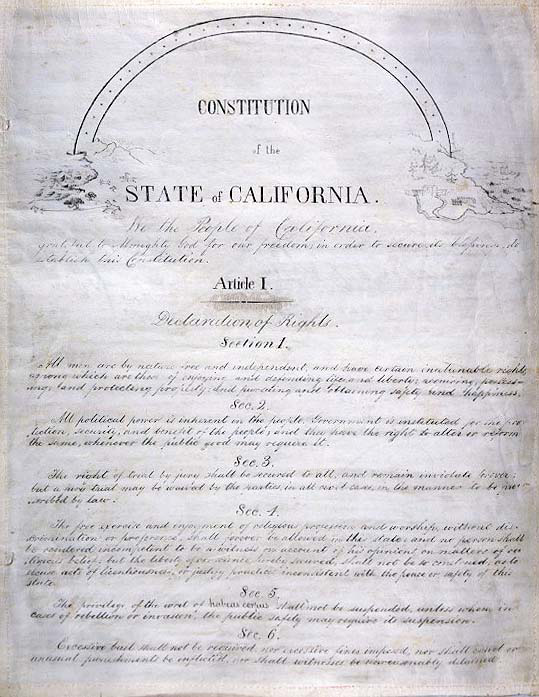
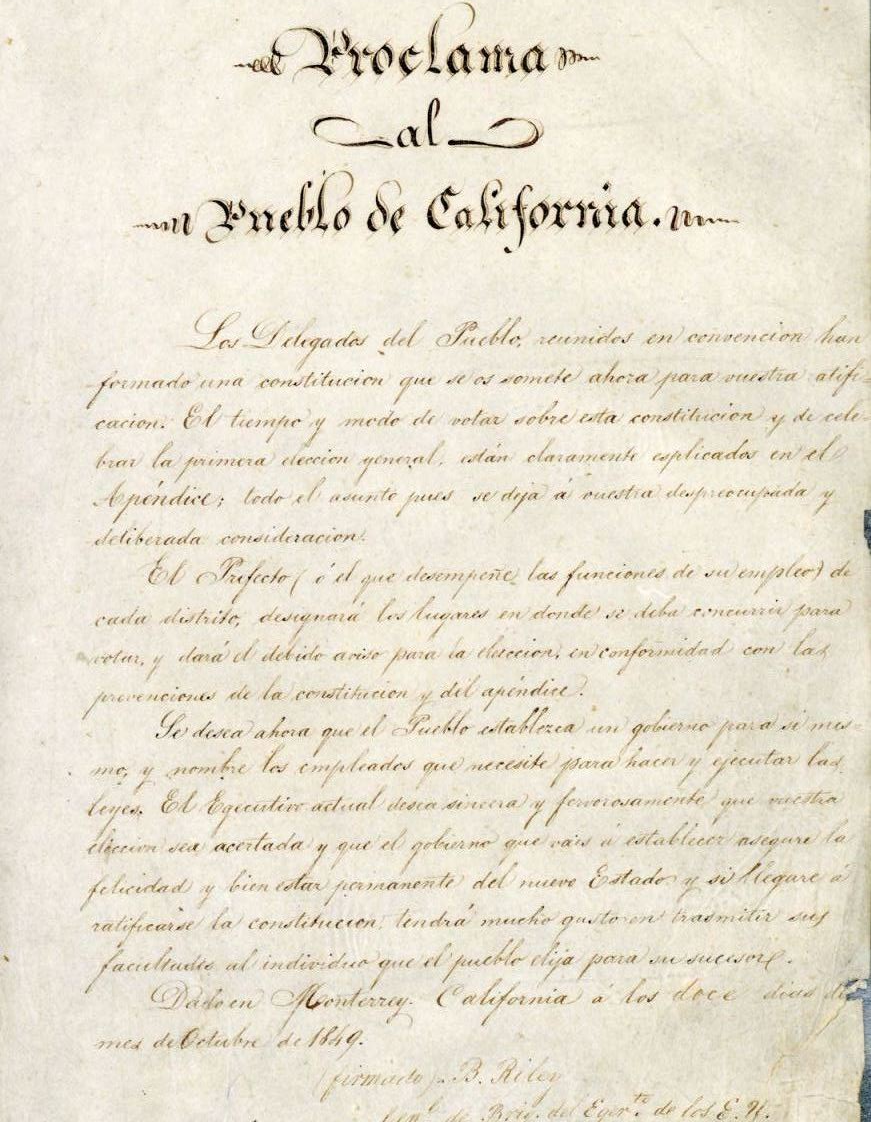
The 1849 handwritten copies of the Constitution of California in both English and Spanish.

The California Constitutional Conventions were two separate constitutional conventions that took place in California during the nineteenth century which led to the creation of the modern Constitution of California. The first, known as the 1849 Constitutional Convention of Monterey, held in September and October 1849 in advance of California attaining U.S. statehood the following year, adopted the state's original constitution. This document maintains jurisdiction along with the current constitution which was ratified on May 7, 1879, following the 1879 Constitutional Convention of Sacramento. Article 3 Section 2 of the current Constitution references the original boundaries as stated in the 1849 Constitution at Article 12. The result of Progressive mistrust of elected officials, this later constitution took a full year to finalize (March 1878 to March 1879) and has been described as "the perfect example of what a constitution ought not to be". Multiple calls for a third state constitutional convention have been raised during the past quarter-century, but none has thus far gained widespread political momentum.

== Monterey Convention of 1849 ==
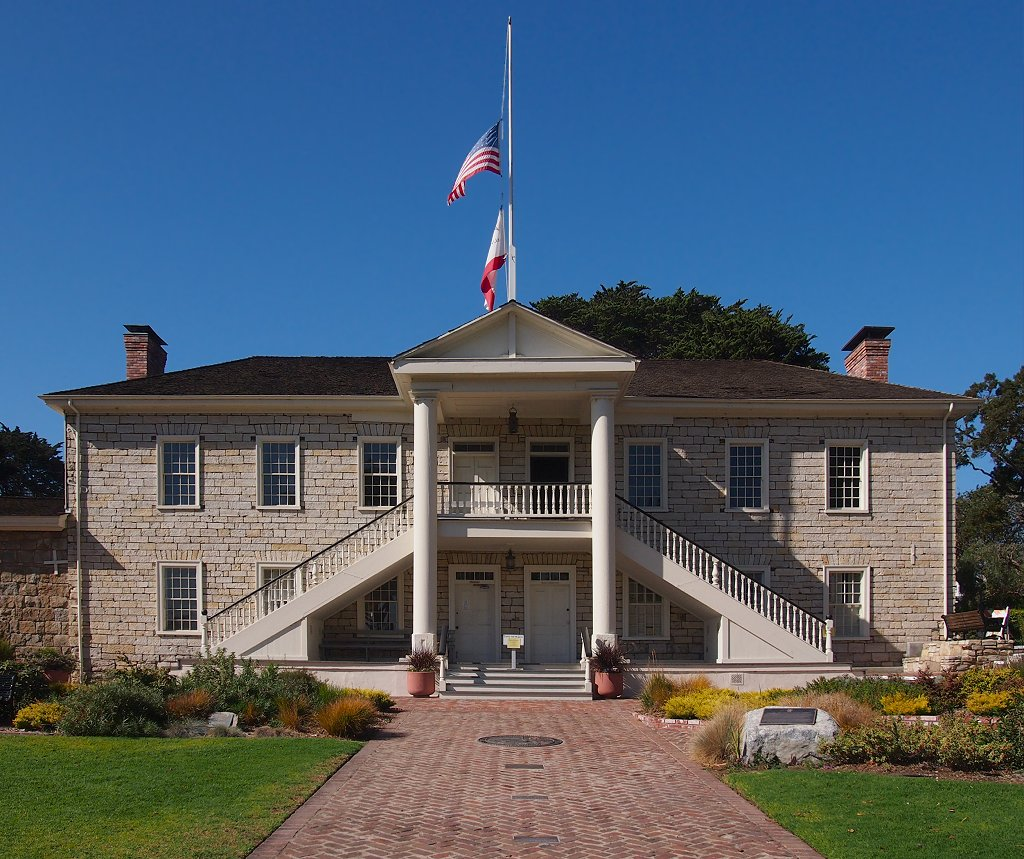
Colton Hall in Monterey, site of the 1849 Constitutional Convention

The Monterey Convention of 1849, in Monterey, was the first California Constitutional Convention to take place. Bvt. Brig. Gen. Bennett C. Riley, ex officio Governor of California, issued a proclamation on June 3, 1849 calling for a convention and a special election on August 1 where delegates to the convention would be elected.

The memorial presenting the proposed constitution to Congress claimed that it banned slavery not out of anti-slavery sentiment, but due to unanimous agreement including from delegates originally from slave states that California's climate and soil were unsuitable for slave labor. It also described the proposed eastern boundary as a compromise between those who wished to include all of former Mexican Alta California (including today's Nevada, Utah, and Arizona) and a committee-proposed eastern boundary at 116° (including the western half of Nevada but excluding the Lower Colorado River Valley and Imperial Valley), and denied having considered north–south division at the Missouri Compromise Line (south of Carmel and Fresno), saying Southern Californians had no interest in division. Another motion during the convention would have banned African Americans from immigrating to the state. The motion failed and read as follows:

The Legislature shall, at its first session, pass such laws as will effectually prohibit free persons of color from immigrating to and settling in the State, and to effectually prevent the owners of slaves from bringing them to this State for the purpose of setting them free: Provided, That nothing in this Constitution shall be construed to conflict with the provisions of the first clause of the second section of the fourth article of the Constitution of the United States.

== Sacramento Convention of 1878–79 ==
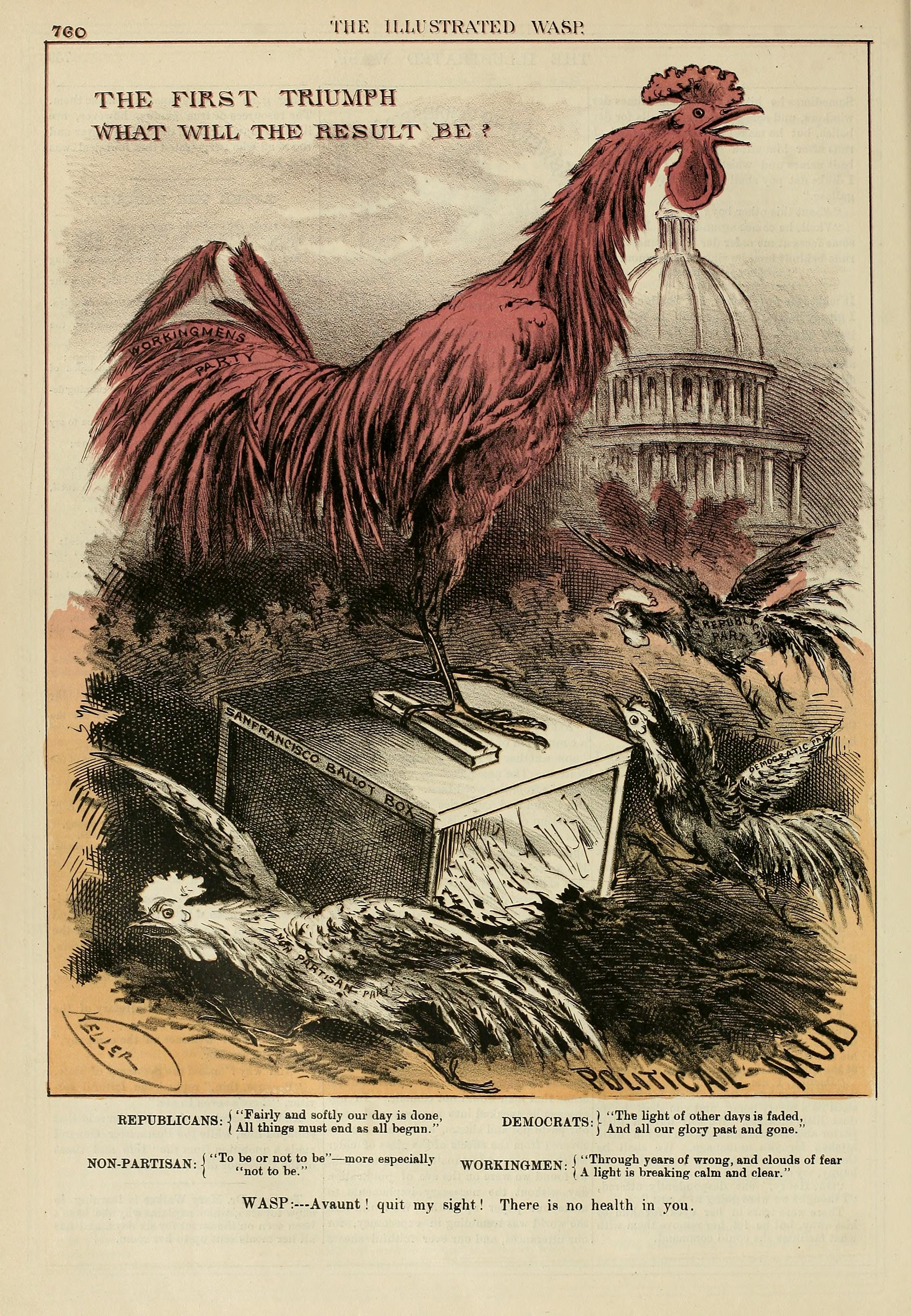
"The First Triumph; What Will the Result Be?" A political cartoon by George Frederick Keller published in The Wasp depicting the victory of the Workingmen's Party of California in the Constitutional Convention elections, June 29, 1878

The Sacramento Convention of 1878–79 amended and ratified the original 1849 constitution. Delegates were elected on June 19, 1878 and the convention was held in Sacramento, California from September 28, 1878 to March 3, 1879.

The Convention was composed of 152 delegates. A series of districts were apportioned 88 delegates. Some of the districts were composed of a single county, some composed of several counties, and others operated as floterial districts. The electorate of the State at-large elected 32 delegates. Each of the four Congressional district elected 8 delegates.

Of the delegates elected, 81 were Nonpartisans, 51 were Workingmen, eleven were Republicans, seven were Democrats, and two were Independents.

The new California Constitution produced by the Convention was voted for on May 7, 1879, and adopted by a vote of 77,959 to 67,134.

== Future Conventions ==
Present language in the Constitution of California: "The Legislature by rollcall vote entered in the journal, two-thirds of the membership of each house concurring, may submit at a general election the question whether to call a convention to revise the Constitution. If the majority vote yes on that question, within 6 months the Legislature shall provide for the convention. Delegates to a constitutional convention shall be voters elected from districts as nearly equal in population as may be practicable." (ARTICLE XVIII AMENDING AND REVISING THE CONSTITUTION SEC. 2)

Two proposition petitions circulating in 2010, 09-0066 Citizens' Constitutional Convention Act and 09-0067 The Call for a Citizens' Limited Constitutional Convention, when read together would have amended the mechanism of calling a constitutional convention. Specifically the Citizens' Constitutional Convention Act "shall specify a fair method for selecting or electing citizens to be delegates to a constitutional convention". The Call for a Citizens' Limited Constitutional Convention would have three types of delegates: Assembly district, County, and Tribal. There would be 240 delegates from the Assembly districts: three delegates elected by, and among, a randomly selected pool of 50 eligible persons from each Assembly district. There would be one County delegate for every whole fraction of 175,000 persons residing in each County, provided that there would be at least one County delegate for each County. According to the 2010 census, there would have been 217 County delegates. One delegate would be selected by federally recognized tribes in each of the four federal judicial districts of California. This plan would have provided total of 461 delegates, each having one vote. 231 would have been required to propose amendments to the electorate, but broad consensus would have been highly encouraged.
