= Carl Browne =

American cartoonist (1849–1914)

- Portrait by C. M. Bell, 1894
- Born: Carl Dryden Browne; July 4, 1849; Newton, Iowa, U.S.
- Died: January 16, 1914 (aged 64); Washington, D.C., U.S.
- Occupations: Cattle rancher, journalist, politician
- Political party: Workingmen's; Greenback; Populist; Socialist
- Spouse: Mamie Coxey (m. 1895)
- Children: 1

Carl Dryden Browne (July 4, 1849 – January 16, 1914) was an American cattle rancher, cartoonist, journalist, and politician. A former close political associate of controversial San Francisco politician Denis Kearney, Browne is best remembered as a leader of the Coxey's Army protest movement of 1894.

== Early life ==
Carl Dryden Browne was born July 4, 1849, in Newton, Iowa. His father was a soldier who had seen action in both the Mexican–American War and the American Civil War, in which he fought as a member of the Union army.

== San Francisco political career ==
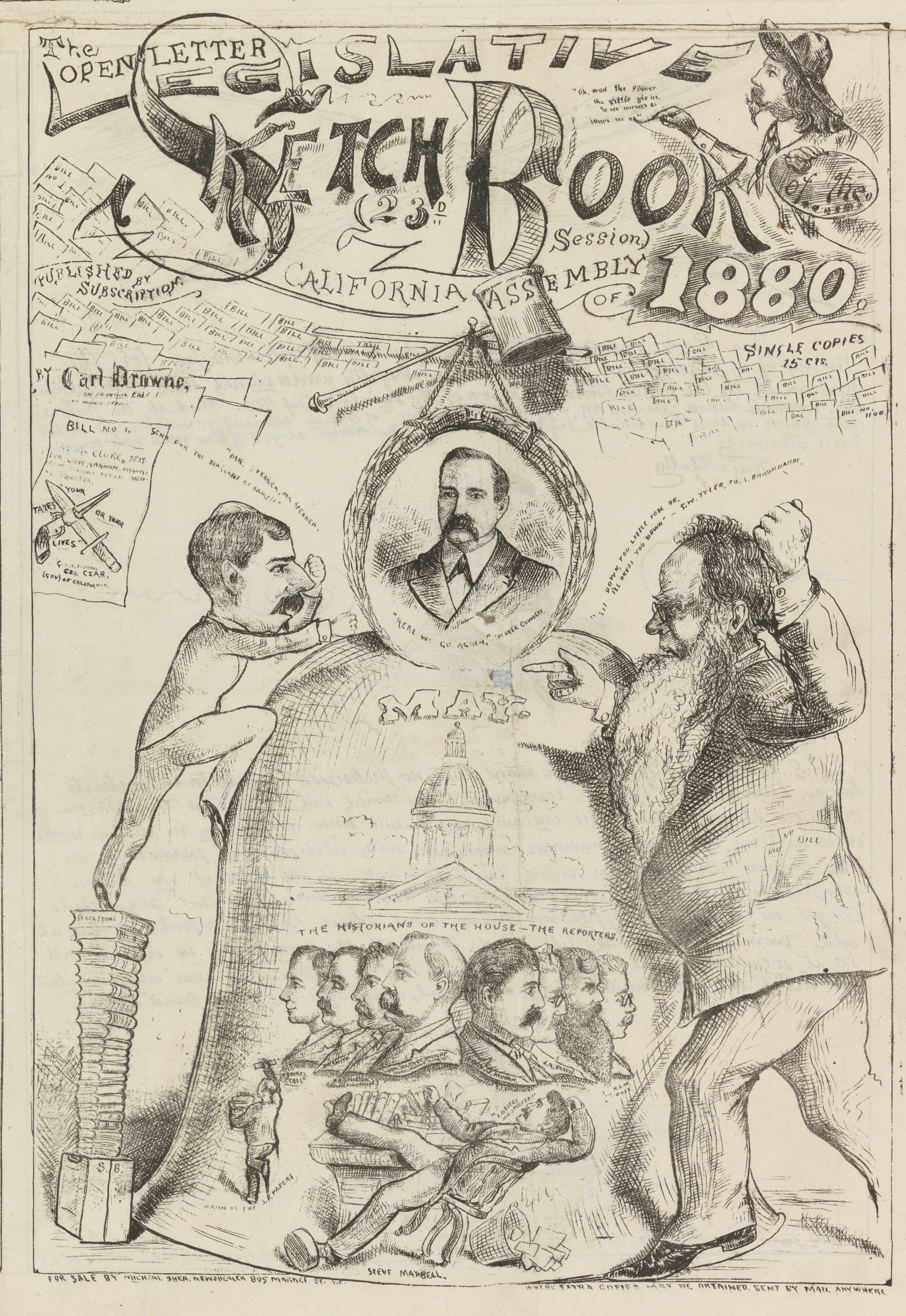
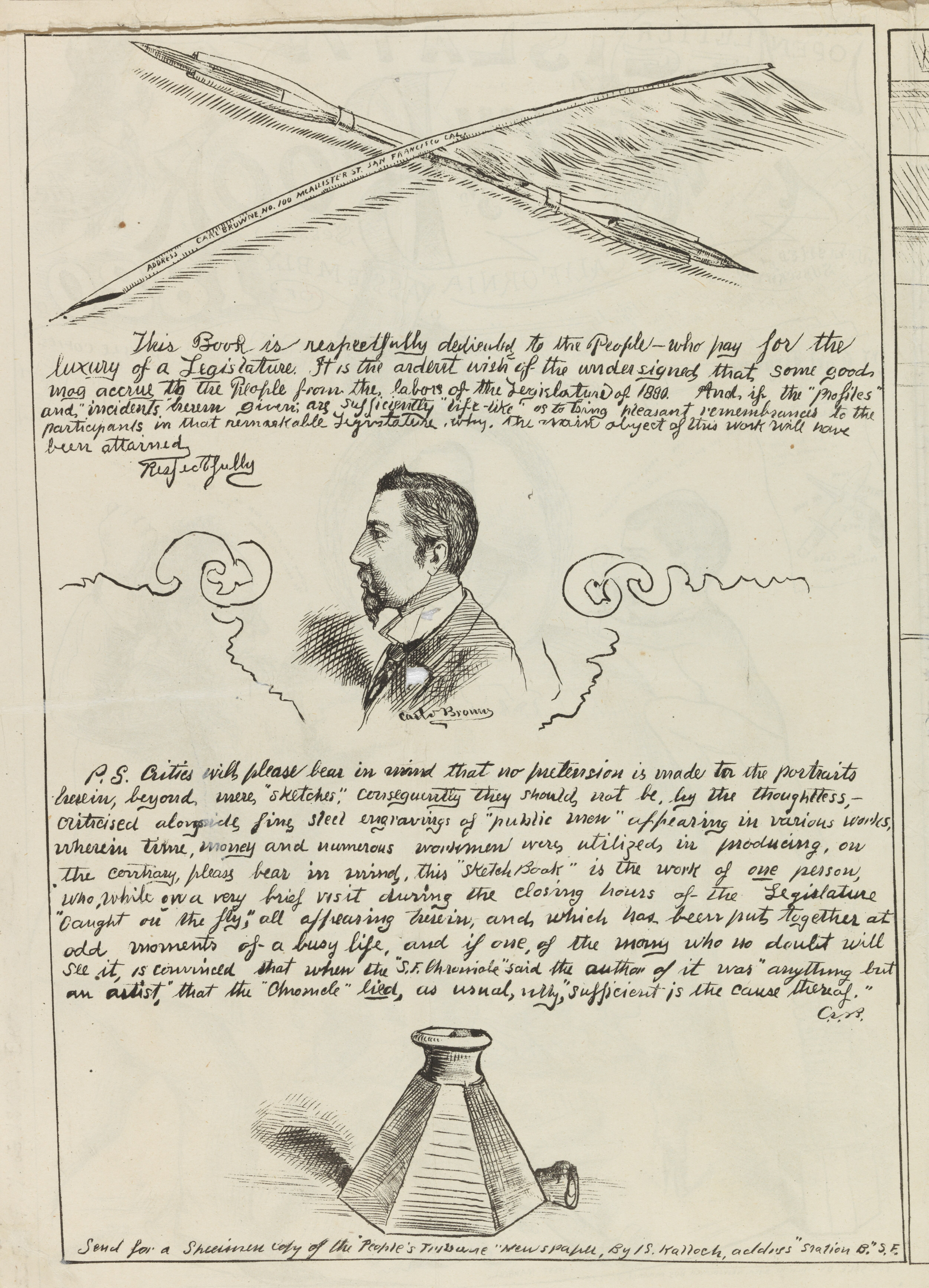
The front and back page of Browne's Open Letter Legislative Sketch Book, 23d Session, California Assembly of 1880. The front features caricatures of assemblymen Samuel Braunhart, Jabez F. Cowdery, George W. Tyler and Stephen Maybell, while the back features a self-portrait.

Browne worked a variety of jobs in his younger years, including time as a printer, a painter, a cattle rancher, a cartoonist, and a journalist. He moved to San Francisco and became active in politics as a member of the anti-Chinese Workingmen's Party of California. He was soon recognized for his commitment to the organization and served a stint as personal secretary to party leader Denis Kearney. He was active in the party as late as 1880 and belonged to a faction that later joined the Greenback Party. He later joined the Populist Party and served as a delegate to its 1892 National Convention.

While in San Francisco, Browne launched The Open Letter, a radical weekly newspaper which he edited and for which he drew political cartoons.

== The Coxey campaign ==
Marshal Browne, on horseback, leads Coxey's Army to Washington, D.C., 1894

At a Chicago convention of advocates of free silver held in August 1893, Browne made the acquaintance of Ohio politician Jacob Coxey, who saw in the charismatic labor agitator Browne a potential popularizer of his proposed governmental reforms. Browne had become well known in Chicago as an agitational public speaker, addressing a series of public meetings at Lake Front Park on the problem of unemployment and its possible solution – one means of which, he is said to have suggested, would be a march of unemployed workers on the nation's capital.

Browne, on horseback, addresses marchers from Coxey's Army, 1894

Impressed with the charismatic Browne's effectiveness and intellectual proximity to his own ideas, Coxey convinced Browne to join his campaign for the Good Roads Bill – a plan for putting the unemployed to work improving the transportation infrastructure of the United States. Browne obliged, both speaking on its behalf and drawing a series of cartoons illustrating the dysfunctional nature of the current economic system and depicting the benefits to be obtained by society through passage of the Coxey plan.

Coxey was pleased with Browne's commitment to the cause of labor reform and persuaded him to stay with him at his home in Massillon, Ohio, through the winter of 1893–94, a grim time when the United States was buffeted by the severe economic contraction known to history as the Panic of 1893. Together Coxey and Browne discussed a means of better publicizing the Good Roads Bill, with the pair determining to, in Coxey's words, "send a petition to Washington with boots on" through a cross-country march of the unemployed.

Browne and Coxey held a series of public meetings in Massillon and other towns in the area, drawing attention to Coxey's proposed Good Roads Bill and drawing attention to the planned march, which was to depart from Massillon for Washington, D.C., on Easter Sunday, 1894.

Browne gained notoriety for his Theosophic religious views, which posited the reincarnation of souls from a common pool of the deceased – with Browne contending that both he and Coxey possessed unusually large components of the soul of Jesus Christ. Browne immodestly referred to Coxey in public as the "Cerebrum of Christ" and himself as the "Cerebellum of Christ," monikers deemed sacrilegious by many devout Christians of the day. Coxey was converted to Browne's unorthodox theological ideas and the pair came to regard their march as an "Army of Peace," giving the name "Commonweal of Christ" to their movement. This quasi-religious interpretation of the 1894 march movement was broadly ridiculed, generating some publicity for the cause but generally doing "a great deal more harm than good," in the estimation of at least one historian.

=== Arrest ===
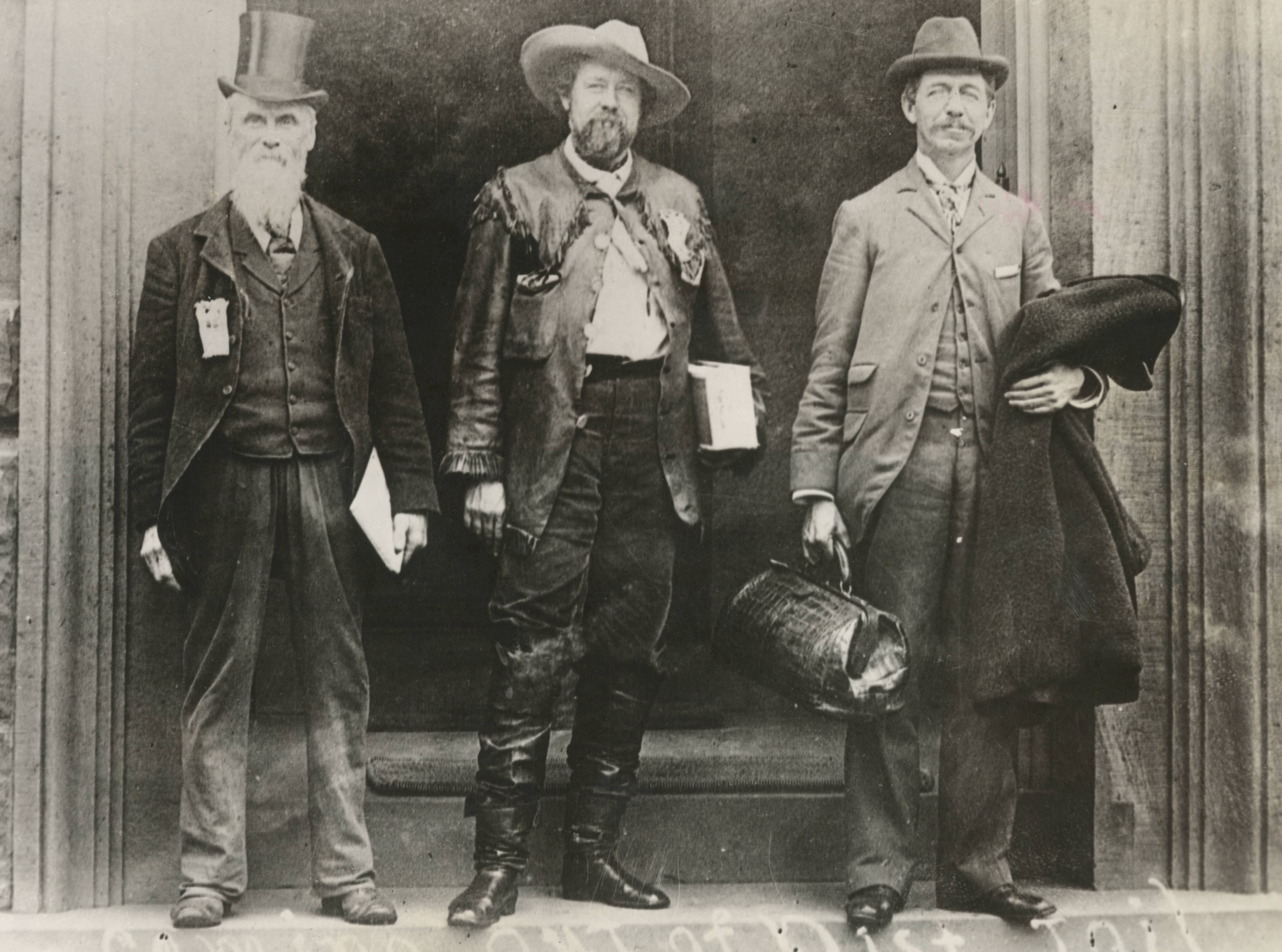
Jacob Coxey (right) is released from the D.C. Jail alongside associates Christopher Columbus Jones (left) and Browne (center), 1894

The "Commonweal of Christ" arrived in Washington, D.C., on May Day, 1894, with about 400 marchers in the ranks. Coxey and Brown made their way to the steps of the United States Capitol to address the accompanying crowd, but were blocked by mounted police. The pair jumped a stone wall in an attempt to reach their goal, along with Christopher Columbus Jones, leader of the marchers from Philadelphia, but police on foot chased the three down and detained them, first holding down Browne and beating him, tearing his clothes and ripping off the amber bead necklace from his neck. Coxey was released, but Browne and Jones were placed under arrest, with bond posted by two wealthy sympathizers of the marchers.

On May 2, Coxey, Browne, and Jones were charged in police court with carrying an illegal banner on capitol grounds, with Coxey and Browne additionally charged with trampling the grass. A jury trial followed, during which the District Attorney denigrated Browne as "a fakir, a charlatan, and a mounteback who dresses up in ridiculous garments and exhibits himself to the curious multitudes at 10 cents a head." The three defendants were convicted on the morning of May 8 and freed on bond.

Sentence was pronounced on May 21, with Coxey and Browne each fined $5 for walking on the grass, and Coxey, Browne, and Jones sentenced to 20 days in jail for carrying banners on capitol grounds.

== Later life and death ==
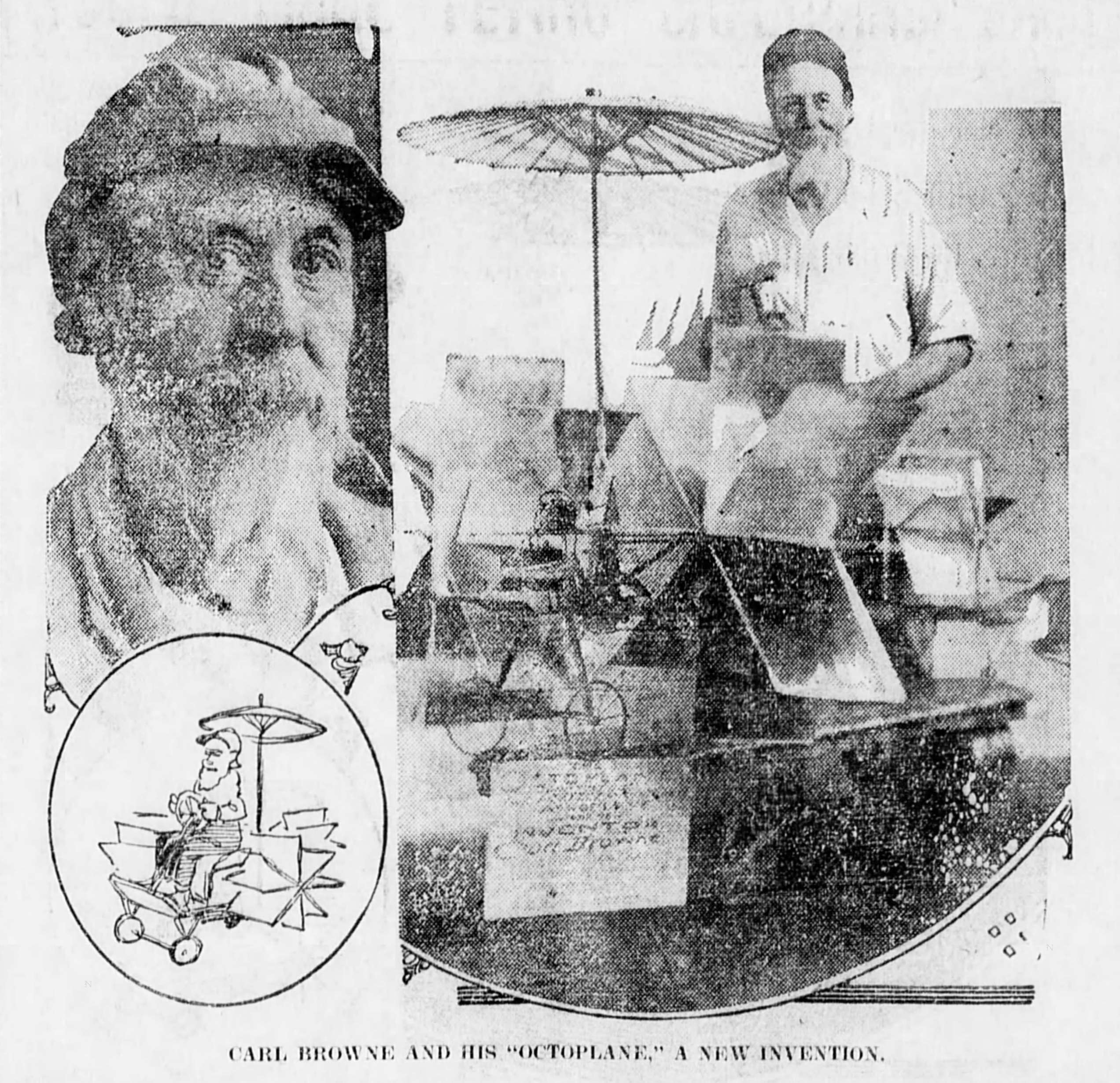
Browne and his "Octoplane," 1913

Browne married Jacob Coxey's daughter, Mamie, in 1895. According to contemporary press reports, the bride's father did not approve of the union and the marriage was brief, but the pair did live for a time in California, where they were parents to a son.

During the 1902 California gubernatorial election, Browne organized the "United Labor Party" and was its nominee for governor. However, before the election was held secretary of state Charles F. Curry denied Browne and his party a place on the November ballot on the grounds that their name was too similar to the preexisting Union Labor Party and that the signatures the party collected were invalid. Four years later, Browne attempted to form a political coalition between the Populist and Prohibition Parties with himself as their candidate for governor, but this did not work either. He later pledged his support to Independence League candidate William H. Langdon. While giving a speech on his behalf in Napa, Browne was assaulted by a mob of young men who threw sticks, rocks, and vegetables at him.

In 1913, Browne led another "army of the unemployed" on a march to Sacramento in support of a bill to provide work for them. They were supported by Berkeley mayor J. Stitt Wilson. Later that year, he tried his hand as an inventor, building and patenting a heavier-than-air flying machine he dubbed the "Octoplane."

Browne collapsed and died in Washington, D.C. on January 16, 1914. He was 64 years old at the time of his death. A committed member of the Socialist Party of America since 1907, Browne's Washington, D.C., funeral was arranged and financed by his party comrades. No members of the Coxey family are believed to have attended.

== Legacy ==
In a 1929 monograph, historian Donald L. McMurry described the colorful Browne in the following manner:

Browne's picturesque appearance made him a conspicuous figure wherever he went. Tall, heavy, and bearded, his unkempt hair streaked with gray, he added to the effect by wearing an exaggerated Western costume. It consisted of a buckskin coat with fringes, and buttons made of Mexican silver half-dollars, high boots, a sombrero, a fur cloak when weather permitted, and around his neck, instead of a collar, a string of amber beads, the gift of his dying wife.... Closer inspection revealed the reason why his men called him 'Old Greasy. It was suggested that he would have been a more pleasant companion if he had bathed oftener.

In 1944, San Francisco socialist William McDevitt published a posthumous pamphlet by Browne, entitled When Coxey Marcht [marched] on Washington.

== Works ==
- Carl Brown's California Vote Maker, or, Platform and Principles of the (F.A. & I.U.) People's Party. Calistoga: Carl Browne. 1892.
- When Coxey's Army Marcht on Washington. With William McDevitt. San Francisco: William McDevitt, 1944.
