= 1898 California gubernatorial election =

- November 8, 1898
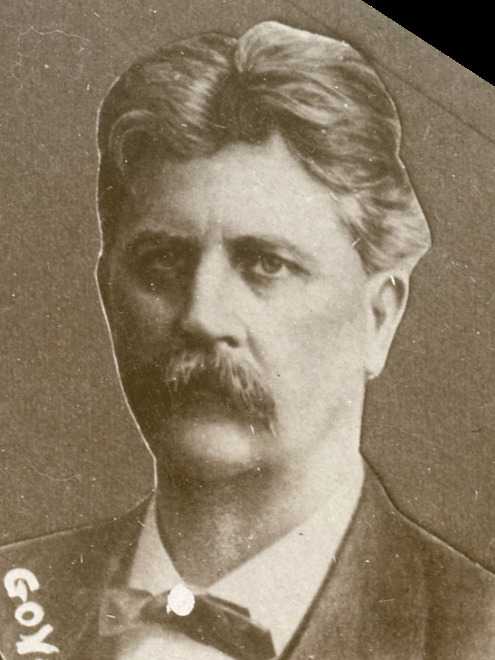

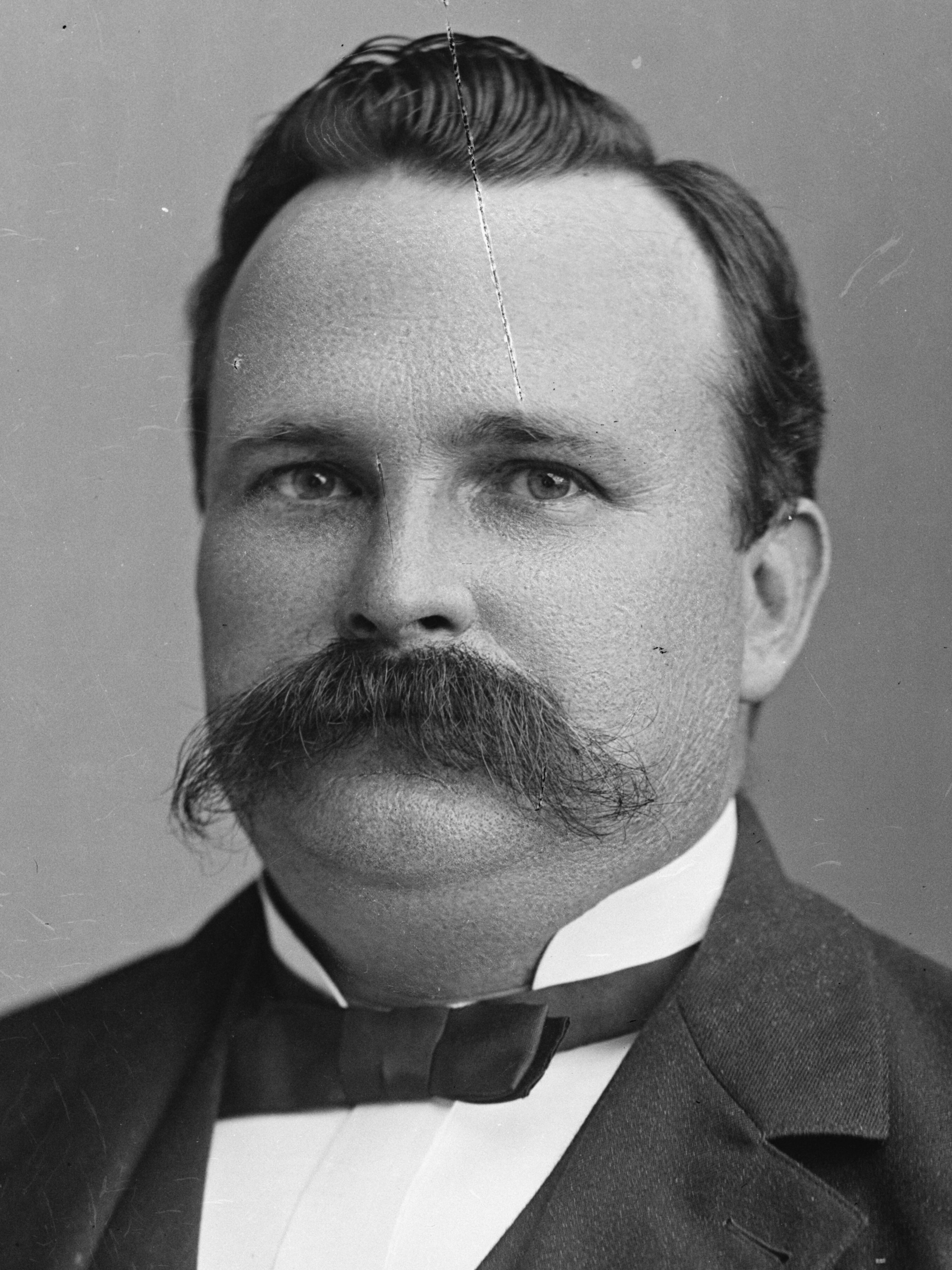
| Nominee | Henry Gage | James G. Maguire |
| Party | Republican | Democratic |
| Alliance | | Populist; Silver Republican |
| Popular vote | 148,354 | 129,261 |
| Percentage | 51.68% | 45.03% |
- County results Gage: 40–50% 50–60% 60–70% Maguire: 40–50% 50–60% 60–70%
Governor before election
James Budd
Democratic
Elected Governor
Henry Gage
Republican

The 1898 California gubernatorial election was held on November 8, 1898, to elect the governor of California. Republican lawyer Henry Gage defeated Democratic-Populist-Silver Republican Fusion Congressman James G. Maguire. For the eighth time in nine elections, the incumbent party failed to retain the governorship. However, that string of flips ended with this election, as Republicans won the next nine consecutive gubernatorial elections in California. (Note: Hiram Johnson was reelected in 1914 on the Progressive ticket, but had originally been elected as a Republican in 1910 and resumed that party affiliation for the US Senate election in 1916)

== Democratic primary campaign ==
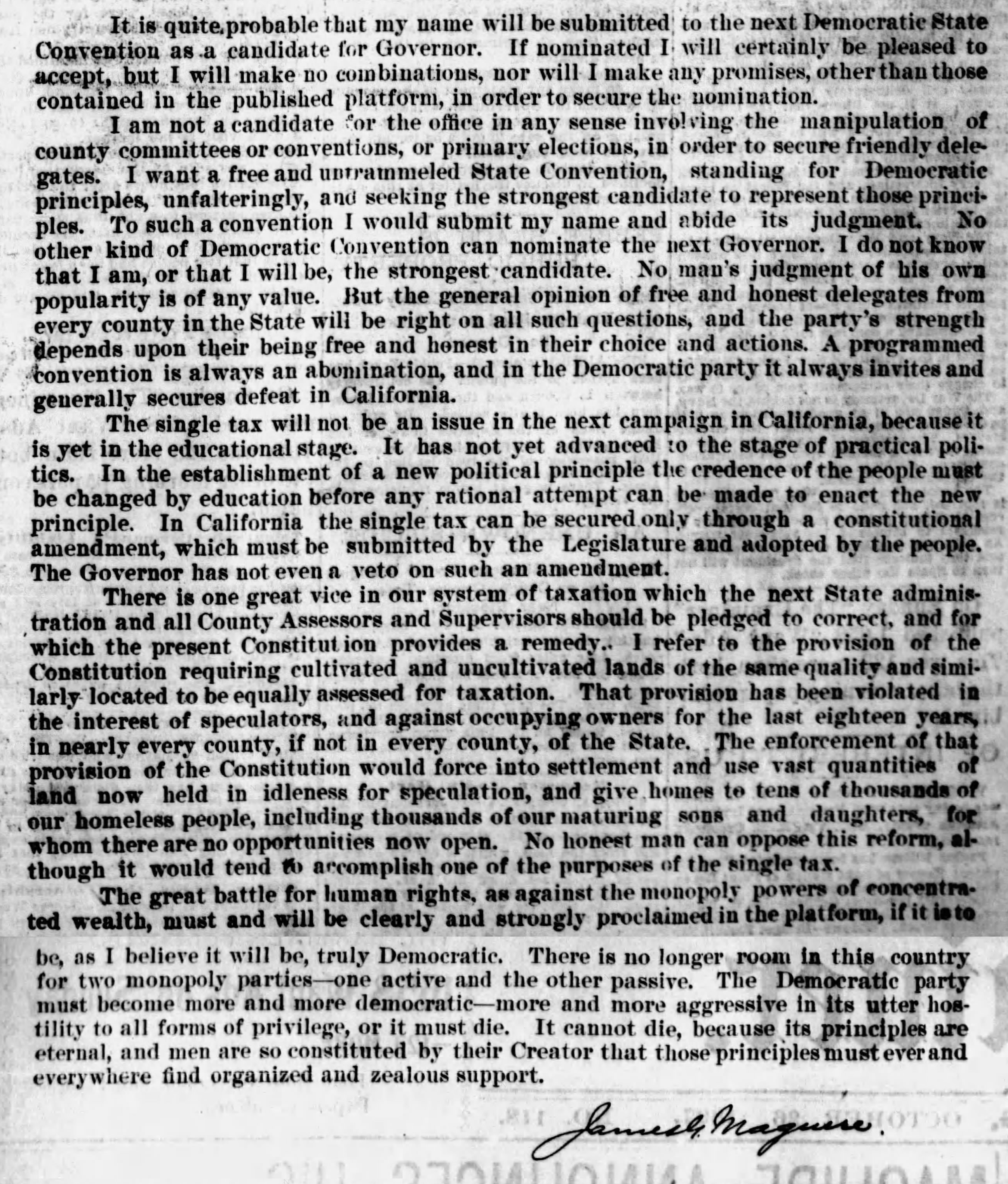
Maguire's full statement announcing his candidacy for governor of California, as published in the San Francisco Examiner, October 26, 1897

On October 26, 1897, Congressman James G. Maguire published a signed statement in the San Francisco Examiner announcing his candidacy for governor of California. By January of 1898, it was not immediately clear whether James Budd would challenge him and seek re-election; at the time Budd was suffering from rheumatism and confined to his bed. In February it was rumored that he preferred to help his lieutenant governor, William T. Jeter, secure the Democratic nomination for governor. The Los Angeles Herald later confirmed that Governor Budd would not seek re-election due to his health and that he would attempt to bring in a dark horse candidate to challenge Maguire, such as Jeter. It was later announced that rancher Hugh McElroy LaRue would run for governor. LaRue would be criticized later in the campaign for allowing Collis P. Huntington, a prominent railroad magnate to leave California.

In February, Senator J.H. Seawall of Mendocino County announced that he was running for governor. In early March, outgoing Senator Stephen M. White told reporters that he advised Maguire to not run for governor and instead stay in Congress, saying:

"I told Maguire at Washington a short time ago that he was making a mistake...The Judge should remain in Congress, where he is a leader and where he can stay until the end of the chapter... Maguire insists, however, that his gubernatorial ambition will end his political career. If he is nominated and elected he will serve his term and quit, and if on the other hand he should fail to reach it, he will quit just the same. I advised him to try for the Senatorship, but be remarked that be had his mind made up. He thinks as I do, that it is a luxury that he cannot afford, and his wife agrees with him, just as my family does with me."

Despite these reservations, Maguire continued to run, and by April was the early favorite to win the Democratic nomination. Even with many favoring Maguire for the nomination, Democratic politicians still maneuvered to cut down his chances for the nomination, even going so far as to change the rules of the nominating convention to boost rural representation, where Maguire's support was allegedly the weakest. In April, Mayor James D. Phelan of San Francisco announced that he would run for governor as a Democrat. In May, the Populist Party met in San Francisco, and announced that they would favor a fusion with the Democratic party and the Silver Republicans. On May 16, a committee consisting of Silver Republican, Populist, and Democrats met in San Francisco and decided that all three parties should join forces for the election and hold their conventions together on a future date. On May 19, James Phelan dropped out of the race, after it was reported that he negotiated a deal with James Budd to secure more mayoral power in San Francisco through a new charter for the city's government in exchange for his resignation from the race as well as his support against Maguire, who Budd did not want winning the nomination.

== Republican primary campaign ==
As early as January 1898, several prominent men were rumored to be interested in the Republican nomination. George Pardee and William R. Davis, both of whom were former Mayors of Oakland, were fighting for the support of the Alameda County Republican Party. Other potential candidates in the beginning of the year were San Francisco District Attorney William S. Barnes, State Senator Thomas Flint Jr., and Attorney General William F. Fitzgerald. While Pardee and Davis were fighting for support within their county, other camps sought to exclude them from the process entirely by rewarding Alameda County with the nomination for a different office, California State Controller, to be given to Oakland City Auditor R. W. Snow.

Beginning in early March, it was rumored that Henry Gage would run not for the U.S. Senate seat to succeed Stephen M. White, but for governor of California. On May 19, Gage officially announced his candidacy. This announcement was met with immediate criticism from fellow Republicans who feared that his candidacy would torpedo the chances of Robert N. Bulla, a fellow Southern California Republican who was running for the U.S. Senate election.

In August 1898, The San Francisco Call asked editors of newspapers across the state to "telegraph us your unbiased opinion as to which of these candidates is strongest in your locality", and compiled a list of candidates: Henry Gage, George C. Pardee, William R. Davis, General John H. Dickinson, Levi Richard Ellert, Lewis H. Brown, Thomas Flint Jr., Charles N. Felton, George A. Knight, William F. Fitzgerald, and Irving Murray Scott.

== Campaign ==
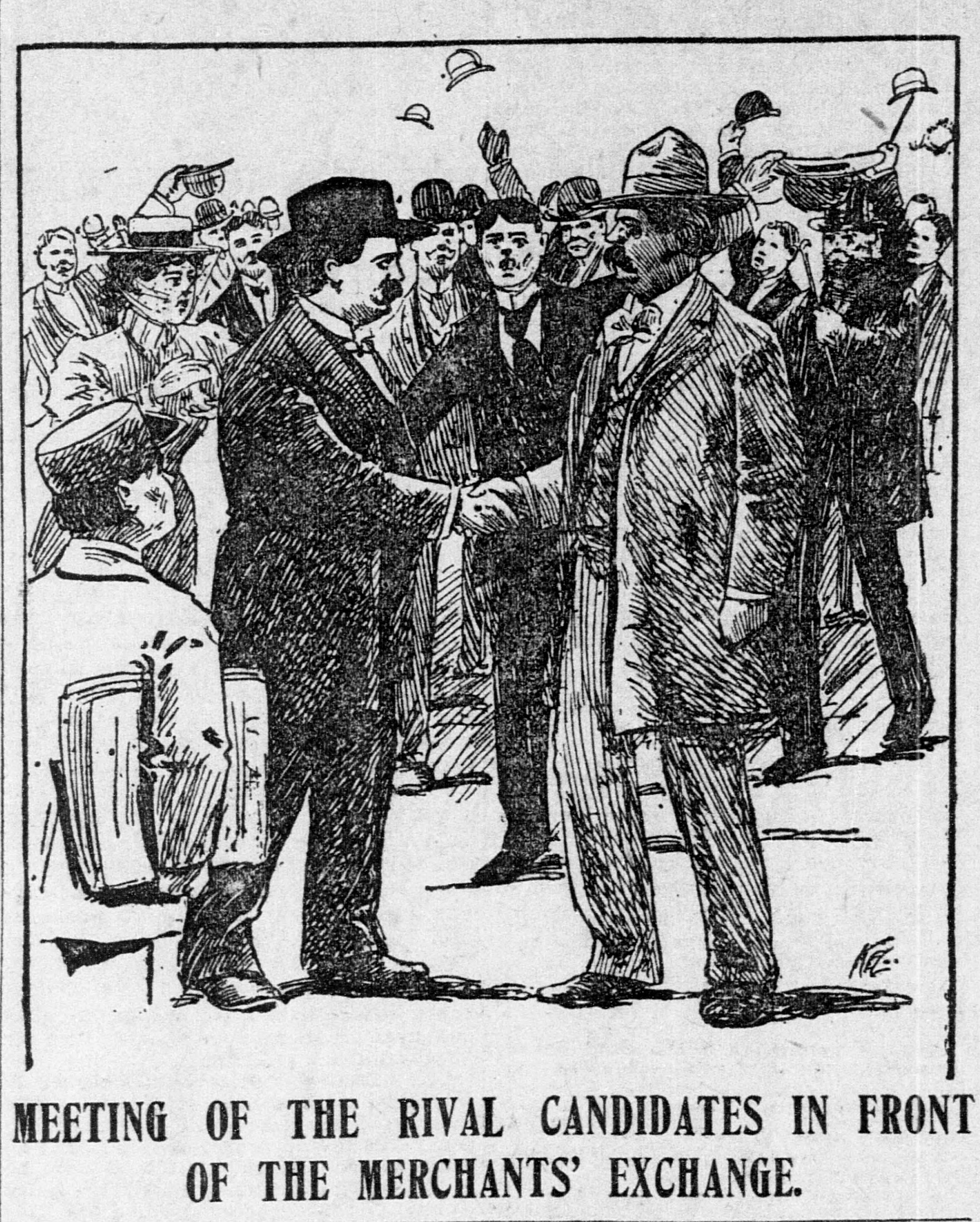
Maguire (left) shakes hands with Gage outside the Merchants Exchange Building in San Francisco, October 8, 1898.

Maguire ran on a platform of anti-monopolism, support for the war with Spain, and opposition to the War Revenue Act of 1898. He was opposed by every major newspaper save for William Randolph Hearst's San Francisco Examiner. Meanwhile, Gage had the backing of the powerful Southern Pacific Railroad and campaigned on support for the War Revenue Act. He denied any connection to Southern Pacific and marketed himself as a political outsider.

During the campaign, Maguire was denounced by Irish Catholic priest Peter Yorke for a book he had written ten years prior, Ireland and The Pope, in which he argued that the subjugation of Ireland by the British Empire had been orchestrated by certain medieval Popes. Yorke's attacks were so severe that Patrick William Riordan, the archbishop of San Francisco, had to distance himself, stating to the press: "Father Yorke is alone responsible for his utterances." Maguire was further criticized by his opponents for his alleged pandering and flip-flopping during his political career; they cited his opposition to the Annexation of Hawaii and the War Revenue Act, as well as his supposed denouncement and then support of Senator Stephen M. White.

Maguire's support for Henry George's single tax was also made an issue in the campaign (although he pledged not to make it one), with various Republican publications and individuals labeling him an anarchist, a socialist, and a communist. Perhaps the greatest charge was that he was a "sandlotter" (I.E. a former member of the Workingmen's Party of California), with the San Francisco Chronicle devoting a full-page article to highlighting the fact that he had previously sought the party's nomination and that several former party members (Clitus Barbour, Samuel Braunhart, John P. Dunn, John Tracy Gaffey, William J. Gavigan, Joseph C. Gorman and A. B. Maguire, among others) were now Democrats active in the Maguire campaign.

== Results ==
California gubernatorial election, 1898
| Party | Candidate | Votes | % | ±% |
|---|---|---|---|---|
| Republican | Henry Gage | 148,354 | 51.68% | +12.76% |
| Democratic | James G. Maguire | 129,261 | 45.03% | +5.69% |
| Socialist Labor | Job Harriman | 5,143 | 1.79% | +1.79% |
| Prohibition | Joseph E. McComas | 4,297 | 1.50% | −2.21% |
| | Scattering | 9 | 0.00% | |
| Majority | | 19,093 | 6.65% | |
| Total votes | | 287,064 | 100.00% | |
| Republican gain from Democratic | | Swing | +7.07% | |

=== Results by county ===
| County | Henry Gage Republican | | James G. Maguire Democratic | | Job Harriman Socialist Labor | | Joseph E. McComas Prohibition | | Scattering Write-in | | Margin | | Total votes cast |
| County | # | % | # | % | # | % | # | % | # | % | # | % | Total votes cast |
|---|---|---|---|---|---|---|---|---|---|---|---|---|---|
| Alameda | 12,080 | 57.24% | 8,308 | 39.37% | 496 | 2.35% | 220 | 1.04% | 1 | 0.00% | 3,772 | 17.87% | 21,105 |
| Alpine | 64 | 69.57% | 28 | 30.43% | 0 | 0.00% | 0 | 0.00% | 0 | 0.00% | 36 | 39.13% | 92 |
| Amador | 1,351 | 49.93% | 1,304 | 48.19% | 24 | 0.89% | 27 | 1.00% | 0 | 0.00% | 47 | 1.74% | 2,706 |
| Butte | 2,245 | 51.38% | 2,012 | 46.05% | 43 | 0.98% | 69 | 1.58% | 0 | 0.00% | 233 | 5.33% | 4,369 |
| Calaveras | 1,609 | 52.24% | 1,432 | 46.49% | 23 | 0.75% | 16 | 0.52% | 0 | 0.00% | 177 | 5.75% | 3,080 |
| Colusa | 664 | 37.14% | 1,076 | 60.18% | 30 | 1.68% | 18 | 1.01% | 0 | 0.00% | -412 | -23.04% | 1,788 |
| Contra Costa | 1,893 | 55.42% | 1,472 | 43.09% | 22 | 0.64% | 29 | 0.85% | 0 | 0.00% | 421 | 12.32% | 3,416 |
| Del Norte | 354 | 51.98% | 305 | 44.79% | 13 | 1.91% | 9 | 1.32% | 0 | 0.00% | 49 | 7.20% | 681 |
| El Dorado | 1,332 | 47.45% | 1,415 | 50.41% | 34 | 1.21% | 26 | 0.93% | 0 | 0.00% | -83 | -2.96% | 2,807 |
| Fresno | 2,783 | 43.20% | 3,390 | 52.62% | 117 | 1.82% | 152 | 2.36% | 0 | 0.00% | -607 | -9.42% | 6,442 |
| Glenn | 561 | 39.79% | 828 | 58.72% | 7 | 0.50% | 14 | 0.99% | 0 | 0.00% | -267 | -18.94% | 1,410 |
| Humboldt | 3,171 | 56.78% | 2,207 | 39.52% | 123 | 2.20% | 84 | 1.50% | 0 | 0.00% | 964 | 17.26% | 5,585 |
| Inyo | 478 | 47.05% | 508 | 50.00% | 13 | 1.28% | 17 | 1.67% | 0 | 0.00% | -30 | -2.95% | 1,016 |
| Kern | 1,723 | 46.61% | 1,886 | 51.01% | 67 | 1.81% | 21 | 0.57% | 0 | 0.00% | -163 | -4.41% | 3,697 |
| Kings | 918 | 49.51% | 898 | 48.44% | 11 | 0.59% | 27 | 1.46% | 0 | 0.00% | 20 | 1.08% | 1,854 |
| Lake | 627 | 42.83% | 757 | 51.71% | 30 | 2.05% | 50 | 3.42% | 0 | 0.00% | -130 | -8.88% | 1,464 |
| Lassen | 558 | 54.39% | 438 | 42.69% | 16 | 1.56% | 14 | 1.36% | 0 | 0.00% | 120 | 11.70% | 1,026 |
| Los Angeles | 14,983 | 52.29% | 12,052 | 42.06% | 479 | 1.67% | 1,138 | 3.97% | 0 | 0.00% | 2,931 | 10.23% | 28,652 |
| Madera | 558 | 41.15% | 765 | 56.42% | 17 | 1.25% | 16 | 1.18% | 0 | 0.00% | -207 | -15.27% | 1,356 |
| Marin | 1,345 | 57.36% | 945 | 40.30% | 47 | 2.00% | 8 | 0.34% | 0 | 0.00% | 400 | 17.06% | 2,345 |
| Mariposa | 521 | 40.08% | 747 | 57.46% | 13 | 1.00% | 19 | 1.46% | 0 | 0.00% | -226 | -17.38% | 1,300 |
| Mendocino | 2,004 | 46.90% | 2,188 | 51.21% | 25 | 0.59% | 56 | 1.31% | 0 | 0.00% | -184 | -4.31% | 4,273 |
| Merced | 801 | 41.61% | 1,074 | 55.79% | 18 | 0.94% | 32 | 1.66% | 0 | 0.00% | -273 | -14.18% | 1,925 |
| Modoc | 375 | 39.72% | 549 | 58.16% | 12 | 1.27% | 8 | 0.85% | 0 | 0.00% | -174 | -18.43% | 944 |
| Mono | 335 | 57.66% | 241 | 41.48% | 2 | 0.34% | 3 | 0.52% | 0 | 0.00% | 94 | 16.18% | 581 |
| Monterey | 1,995 | 47.77% | 2,050 | 49.09% | 54 | 1.29% | 77 | 1.84% | 0 | 0.00% | -55 | -1.32% | 4,176 |
| Napa | 1,947 | 53.89% | 1,578 | 43.68% | 41 | 1.13% | 47 | 1.30% | 0 | 0.00% | 369 | 10.21% | 3,613 |
| Nevada | 2,577 | 55.80% | 1,971 | 42.68% | 19 | 0.41% | 50 | 1.08% | 1 | 0.02% | 606 | 13.12% | 4,618 |
| Orange | 1,992 | 50.03% | 1,781 | 44.73% | 32 | 0.80% | 177 | 4.45% | 0 | 0.00% | 211 | 5.30% | 3,982 |
| Placer | 2,216 | 54.25% | 1,808 | 44.26% | 26 | 0.64% | 34 | 0.83% | 1 | 0.02% | 408 | 9.99% | 4,085 |
| Plumas | 660 | 54.10% | 544 | 44.59% | 8 | 0.66% | 8 | 0.66% | 0 | 0.00% | 116 | 9.51% | 1,220 |
| Riverside | 2,118 | 54.53% | 1,518 | 39.08% | 69 | 1.78% | 179 | 4.61% | 0 | 0.00% | 600 | 15.45% | 3,884 |
| Sacramento | 5,689 | 61.42% | 3,414 | 36.86% | 102 | 1.10% | 57 | 0.62% | 0 | 0.00% | 2,275 | 24.56% | 9,262 |
| San Benito | 738 | 42.05% | 984 | 56.07% | 14 | 0.80% | 19 | 1.08% | 0 | 0.00% | -246 | -14.02% | 1,755 |
| San Bernardino | 2,688 | 48.74% | 2,506 | 45.44% | 98 | 1.78% | 223 | 4.04% | 0 | 0.00% | 182 | 3.30% | 5,515 |
| San Diego | 3,506 | 49.26% | 3,259 | 45.79% | 208 | 2.92% | 144 | 2.02% | 0 | 0.00% | 247 | 3.47% | 7,117 |
| San Francisco | 28,218 | 51.90% | 24,632 | 45.30% | 1,388 | 2.55% | 134 | 0.25% | 0 | 0.00% | 3,586 | 6.60% | 54,372 |
| San Joaquin | 3,894 | 54.73% | 3,018 | 42.42% | 121 | 1.70% | 80 | 1.12% | 2 | 0.03% | 876 | 12.31% | 7,115 |
| San Luis Obispo | 1,657 | 46.27% | 1,828 | 51.05% | 31 | 0.87% | 65 | 1.82% | 0 | 0.00% | -171 | -4.78% | 3,581 |
| San Mateo | 1,587 | 58.03% | 1,098 | 40.15% | 36 | 1.32% | 14 | 0.51% | 0 | 0.00% | 489 | 17.88% | 2,735 |
| Santa Barbara | 2,072 | 51.83% | 1,736 | 43.42% | 95 | 2.38% | 95 | 2.38% | 0 | 0.00% | 336 | 8.40% | 3,998 |
| Santa Clara | 6,821 | 56.02% | 4,883 | 40.11% | 292 | 2.40% | 179 | 1.47% | 0 | 0.00% | 1,938 | 15.92% | 12,175 |
| Santa Cruz | 2,149 | 48.83% | 2,081 | 47.28% | 93 | 2.11% | 78 | 1.77% | 0 | 0.00% | 68 | 1.55% | 4,401 |
| Shasta | 1,598 | 42.62% | 2,028 | 54.09% | 71 | 1.89% | 52 | 1.39% | 0 | 0.00% | -430 | -11.47% | 3,749 |
| Sierra | 757 | 60.71% | 480 | 38.49% | 5 | 0.40% | 4 | 0.32% | 1 | 0.08% | 277 | 22.21% | 1,247 |
| Siskiyou | 1,737 | 49.37% | 1,722 | 48.95% | 38 | 1.08% | 21 | 0.60% | 0 | 0.00% | 15 | 0.43% | 3,518 |
| Solano | 3,005 | 55.50% | 2,262 | 41.78% | 95 | 1.75% | 52 | 0.96% | 0 | 0.00% | 743 | 13.72% | 5,414 |
| Sonoma | 4,063 | 51.87% | 3,587 | 45.79% | 100 | 1.28% | 83 | 1.06% | 0 | 0.00% | 476 | 6.08% | 7,833 |
| Stanislaus | 1,127 | 44.69% | 1,336 | 52.97% | 21 | 0.83% | 38 | 1.51% | 0 | 0.00% | -209 | -8.29% | 2,522 |
| Sutter | 880 | 54.42% | 704 | 43.54% | 13 | 0.80% | 20 | 1.24% | 0 | 0.00% | 176 | 10.88% | 1,617 |
| Tehama | 1,088 | 47.35% | 1,170 | 50.91% | 25 | 1.09% | 15 | 0.65% | 0 | 0.00% | -82 | -3.57% | 2,298 |
| Trinity | 687 | 53.17% | 584 | 45.20% | 14 | 1.08% | 7 | 0.54% | 0 | 0.00% | 103 | 7.97% | 1,292 |
| Tulare | 1,725 | 40.58% | 2,245 | 52.81% | 204 | 4.80% | 74 | 1.74% | 3 | 0.07% | -520 | -12.23% | 4,251 |
| Tuolumne | 1,219 | 41.92% | 1,598 | 54.95% | 42 | 1.44% | 49 | 1.69% | 0 | 0.00% | -379 | -13.03% | 2,908 |
| Ventura | 1,643 | 52.16% | 1,369 | 43.46% | 57 | 1.81% | 81 | 2.57% | 0 | 0.00% | 274 | 8.70% | 3,150 |
| Yolo | 1,695 | 49.46% | 1,651 | 48.18% | 33 | 0.96% | 48 | 1.40% | 0 | 0.00% | 44 | 1.28% | 3,427 |
| Yuba | 1,273 | 54.87% | 1,011 | 43.58% | 16 | 0.69% | 20 | 0.86% | 0 | 0.00% | 262 | 11.29% | 2,320 |
| Total | 148,354 | 51.68% | 129,261 | 45.03% | 5,143 | 1.79% | 4,297 | 1.50% | 9 | 0.00% | 19,093 | 6.65% | 287,064 |

==== Counties that flipped from Democratic to Republican ====
- Amador (Note: Was tied in 1894; flip from Democratic is relative to 1890)
- San Francisco
- San Joaquin
- Santa Clara
- Yolo

==== Counties that flipped from People's to Republican ====
- Humboldt

==== Counties that flipped from Republican to Democratic ====
- Inyo
- Monterey
- San Luis Obispo
- Tehama

==== Counties that flipped from People's to Democratic ====
- Shasta
