= James G. Maguire =

American politician (1853–1920)

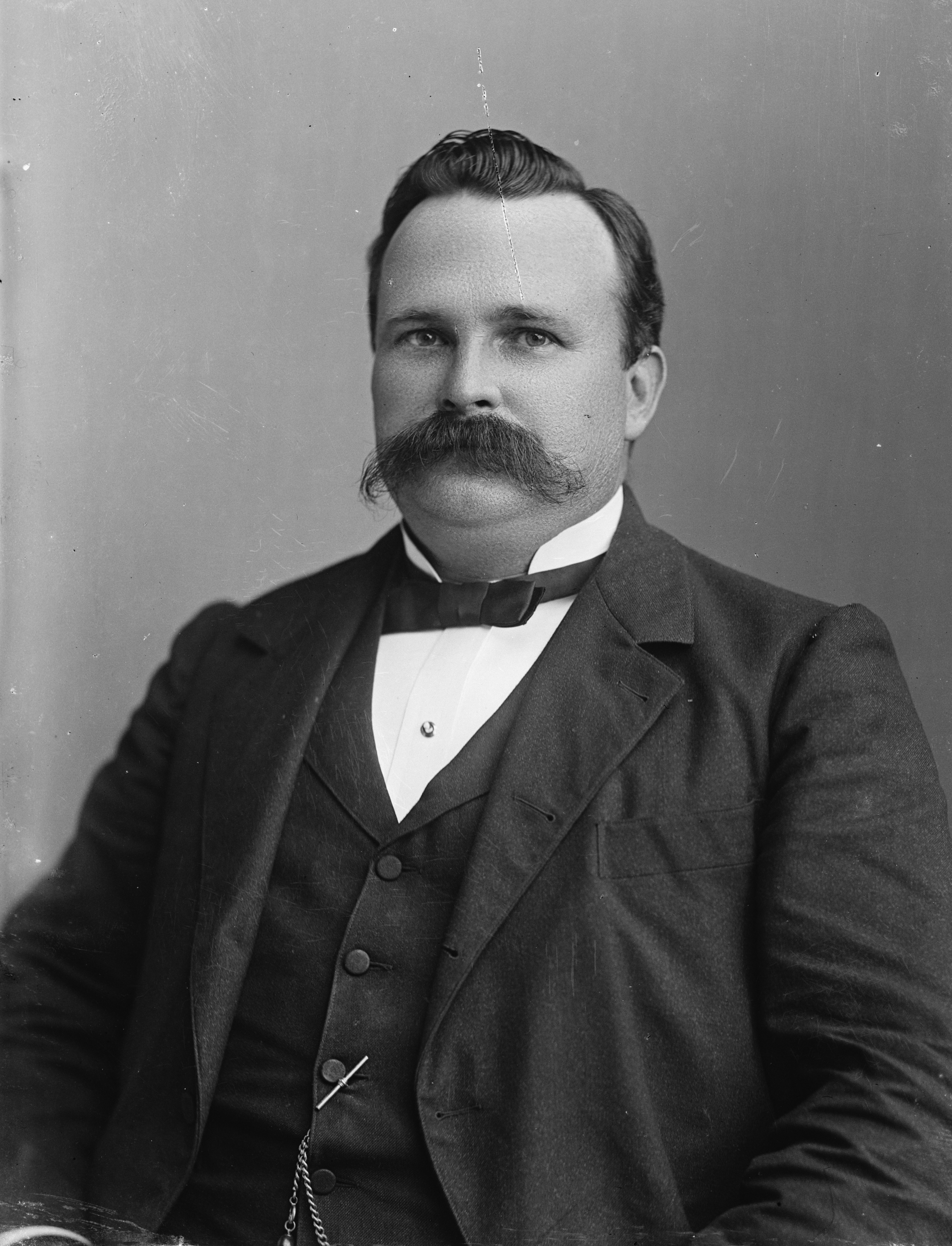
- Portrait by C. M. Bell, 1894

Member of the U.S. House of Representatives from California's 4th district
- In office March 4, 1893 – March 3, 1899
- Preceded by: John T. Cutting
- Succeeded by: Julius Kahn

Judge of the San Francisco County Superior Court
- In office January 8, 1883 – January 8, 1889
- Preceded by: Charles Halsey
- Succeeded by: Joseph P. Hoge

Member of the California State Assembly from the 13th district
- In office December 6, 1875 – December 3, 1877
- Preceded by: Multi-member district
- Succeeded by: Multi-member district

Personal details
- Born: February 22, 1853 Boston, Massachusetts, U.S.
- Died: June 20, 1920 (aged 67) San Francisco, California, U.S.
- Resting place: Greenlawn Memorial Park, Colma, California, U.S.
- Party: Democratic (before 1887, after 1888); United Labor (1887–1888)
- Other political affiliations: Workingmen's (1880–1881); Populist (1898); Silver Republican (1898); Union Labor (1908); Independence (1908)
- Spouse: Louisa J. Joyce (m. 1881; died 1918)
- Children: Willis; Harold; Henry
- Occupation: Blacksmith, attorney, politician
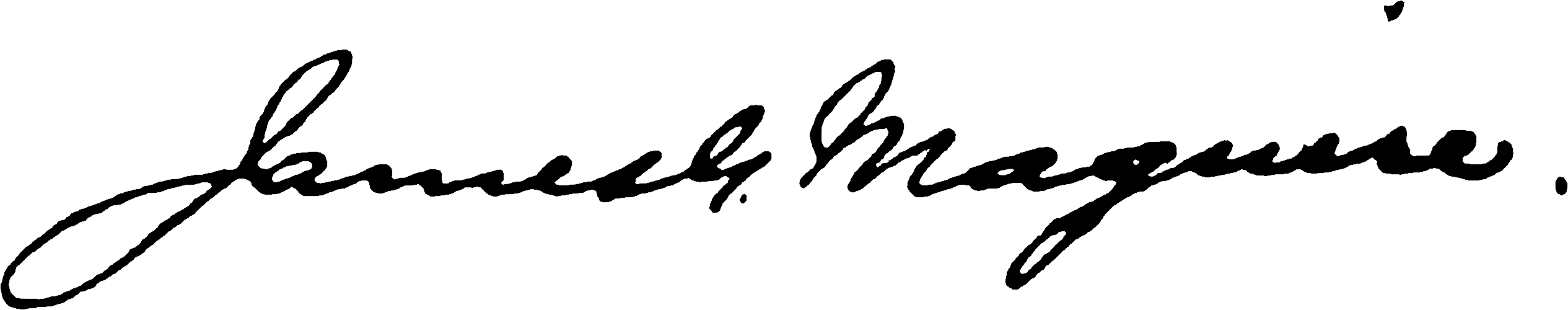
- Signature
- Nickname: "Little Giant"

Military service
- Allegiance: United States
- Branch/service: California National Guard
- Years of service: 1875–1879
- Rank: Lieutenant
- Unit: 3rd Infantry Regiment, Meagher Guard
- Battles/wars: San Francisco Riot of 1877

James George Maguire (February 22, 1853 – June 20, 1920) was an American attorney, politician and Georgist who served in the California State Assembly from 1875 to 1877, as a judge of the San Francisco County Superior Court from 1883 to 1889, and in the United States House of Representatives 1893 to 1899. He was the unsuccessful Democratic nominee for Governor of California in 1898, losing to Republican Henry T. Gage. Short in stature but weighing over two hundred pounds, Maguire was nicknamed the "Little Giant," a sobriquet that came to be used by friends and foes alike.

== Early life and education ==
James George Maguire was born on February 22, 1853, in Boston, Massachusetts. His parents were both Irish immigrants, his father from Donegal and his mother from Kildare. Maguire moved with his parents to California in February 1854, attending the public schools of Watsonville in Santa Cruz County and the private academy of Joseph K. Fallon. Maguire apprenticed for four years as a blacksmith and taught mathematics and English at St. Ignatius College for a year and a half. He served as a Lieutenant in the California National Guard from 1875 to 1879, during which he was called upon to help suppress the San Francisco Riots.

== Political career ==
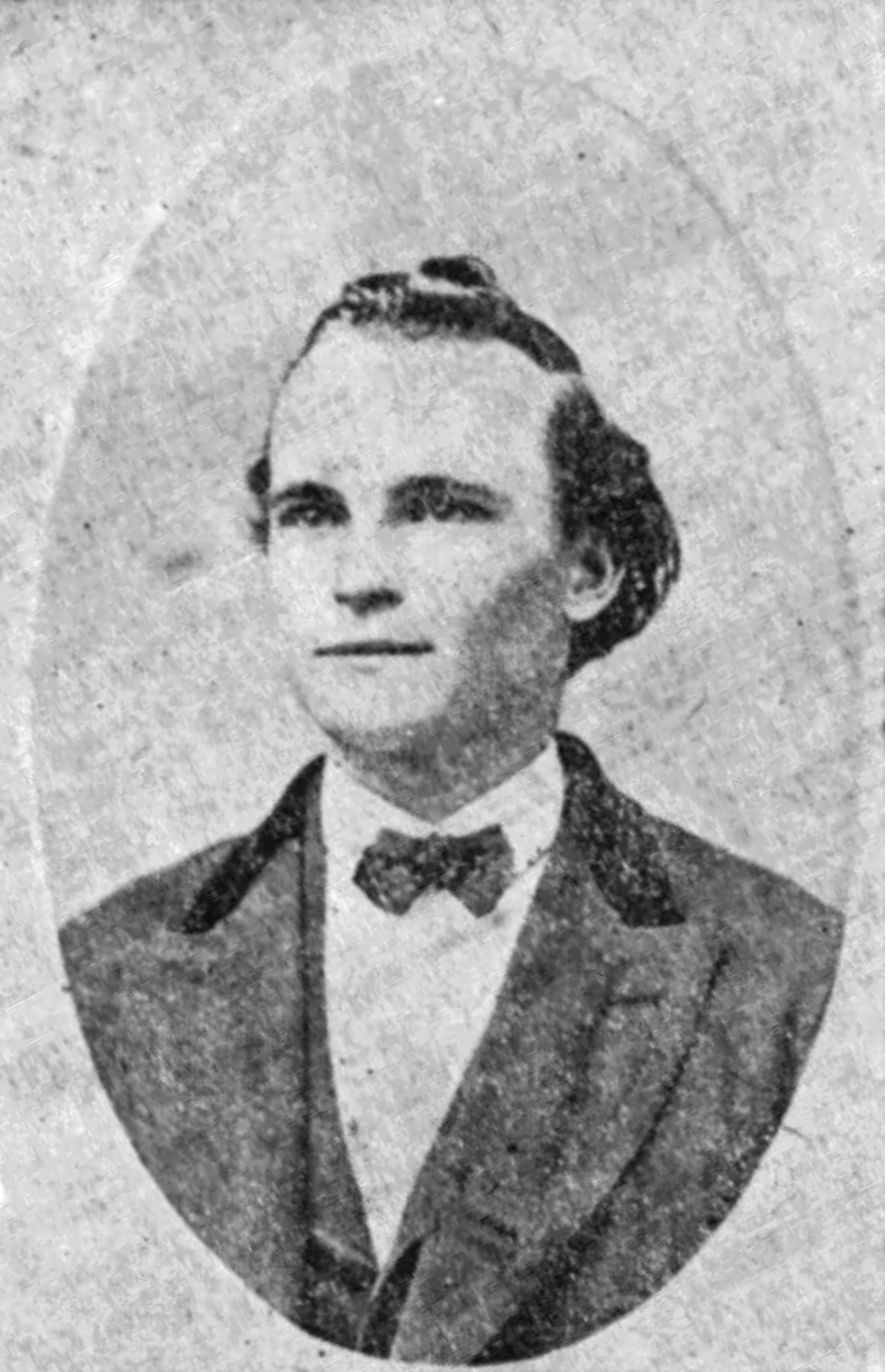
Maguire c. 1877–1878, age 24

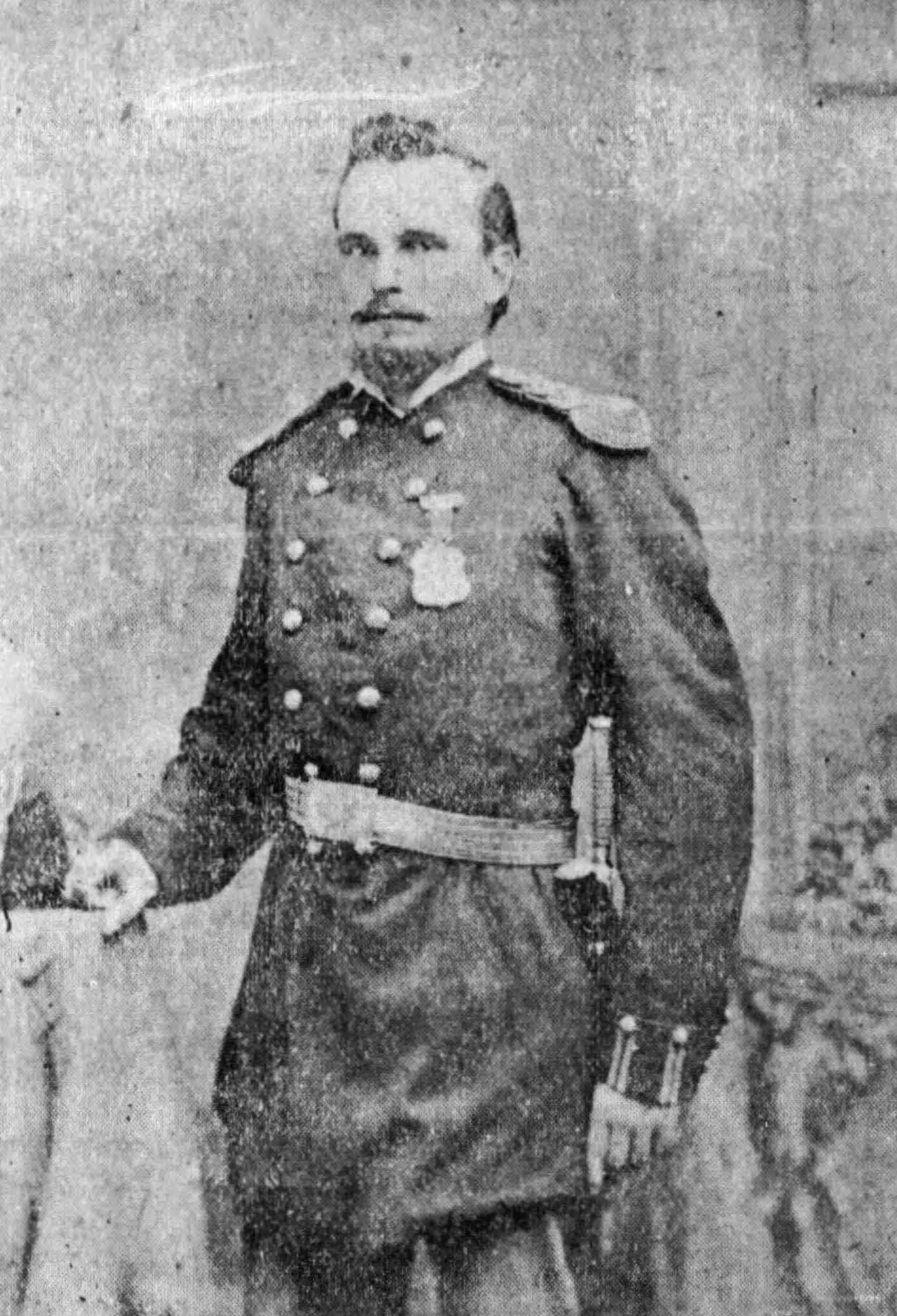
Maguire c. 1881–1882, age 28

Maguire entered public life through the Knights of Father Mathew, in which he was active as early as 1874 and as late as 1880. He served as a member of the California State Assembly from 1875 to 1877, one of 20 members from the five San Francisco districts. At just 22 years old, he was the youngest member of the Legislature. He studied law and was admitted to the Bar by the Supreme Court of California in January 1878, commencing practice in San Francisco. One of his students and clerks was assemblyman Jeremiah J. McCarthy.

Following the adoption of a fusion agreement between the Democratic and Workingmen's Parties, Maguire sought their nomination for judge of the San Francisco County Superior Court in 1880 and city attorney of San Francisco in 1881, but did not gain either. He ran for judge again in 1882 and was elected, serving from 1883 to 1889. Around this time, he became disillusioned with the Democratic Party, which he believed was under the control of political bosses and landlords. In 1887, he left the party for the United Labor Party, in which he was active until its dissolution in 1888. He rejoined the Democratic Party soon after.

=== U.S. Representative ===
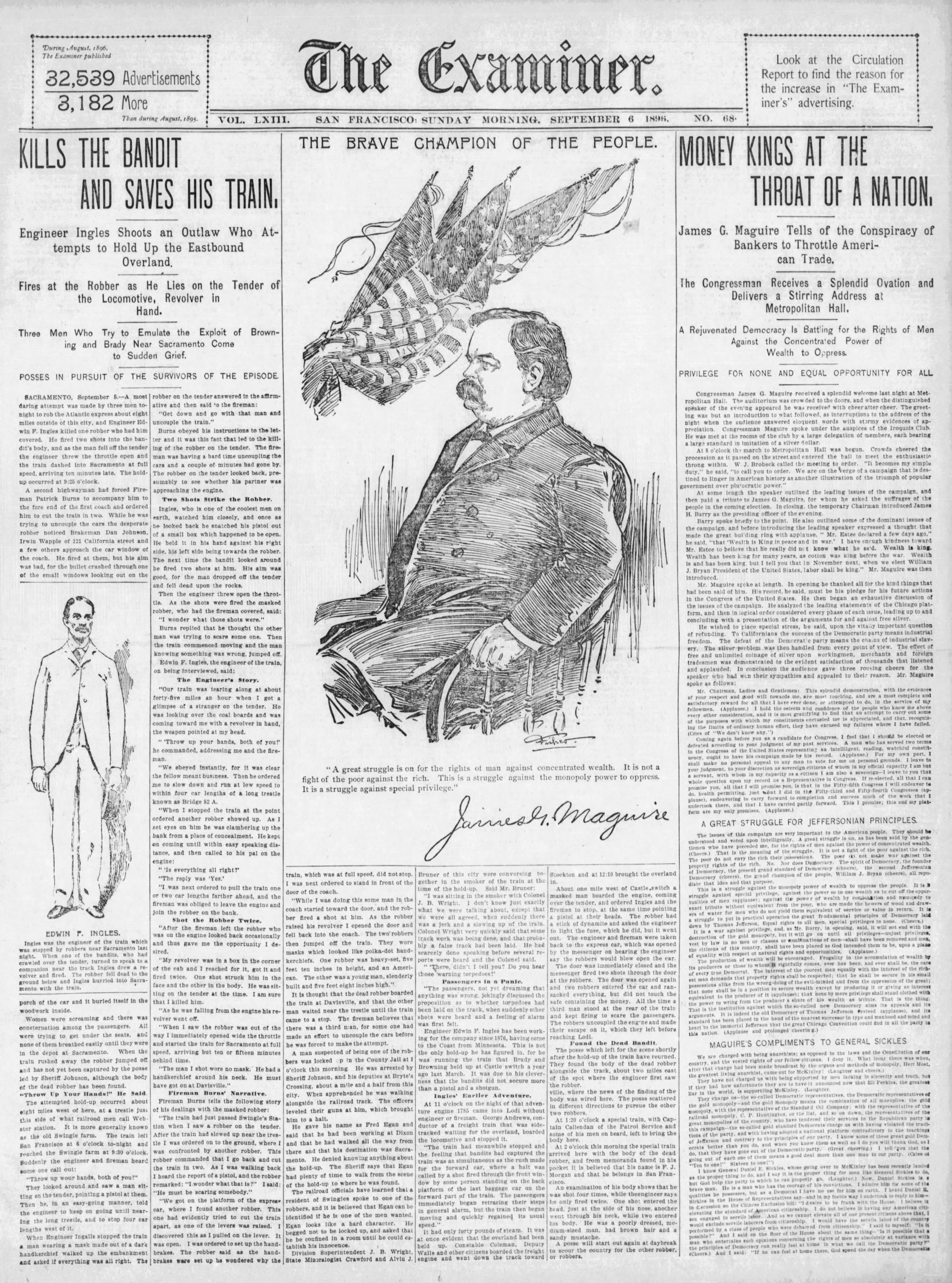
Maguire on the front page of the San Francisco Examiner, September 6, 1896

Maguire was elected as a Democrat to the U.S. House of Representatives from California's 4th congressional district in 1892, serving in the 53rd, 54th, and 55th Congresses from March 4, 1893, to March 3, 1899. He was the ranking member of the House Committee on Immigration and Naturalization during his first term and the House Committee on Elections during his third. He authored the Maguire Act, which abolished the practice of imprisoning sailors who deserted from coastwise vessels.

Maguire supported Chinese exclusion, arguing that their "semibarbarism" threatened the "Caucasian civilization" of the United States. He also blamed "coolie labor" for low wages and high unemployment, stating:

...it is manifestly impossible to maintain one standard of wages for American labor and another for alien labor, competing in the same market, with natural opportunities equally closed against them.

— James G. Maguire, speech in the House of Representatives, October 13, 1893

In line with this and the Democratic Party's anti-imperialism plank, he opposed the annexation of Hawaii. Ironically, he was later hired by the Six Companies of San Francisco's Chinatown to defend Chinese residents from discrimination during the San Francisco plague of 1900–1904. He was also involved with the California Afro-American League.

On January 31, 1894, Maguire proposed an amendment to the Wilson–Gorman Tariff Act that would have established a national single tax. Intended as a substitute for the bill's proposed income tax, it would have levied a direct tax of $31,311,125 on land values nationwide. Only five others voted in favor: Michael D. Harter and Tom L. Johnson of Ohio, Charles Tracey and J. De Witt Warner of New York, and Jerry Simpson of Kansas. After this was rejected, Maguire voted in favor of the original version of the bill and the final version sent back by the Senate several months later.

=== 1898 California gubernatorial campaign ===
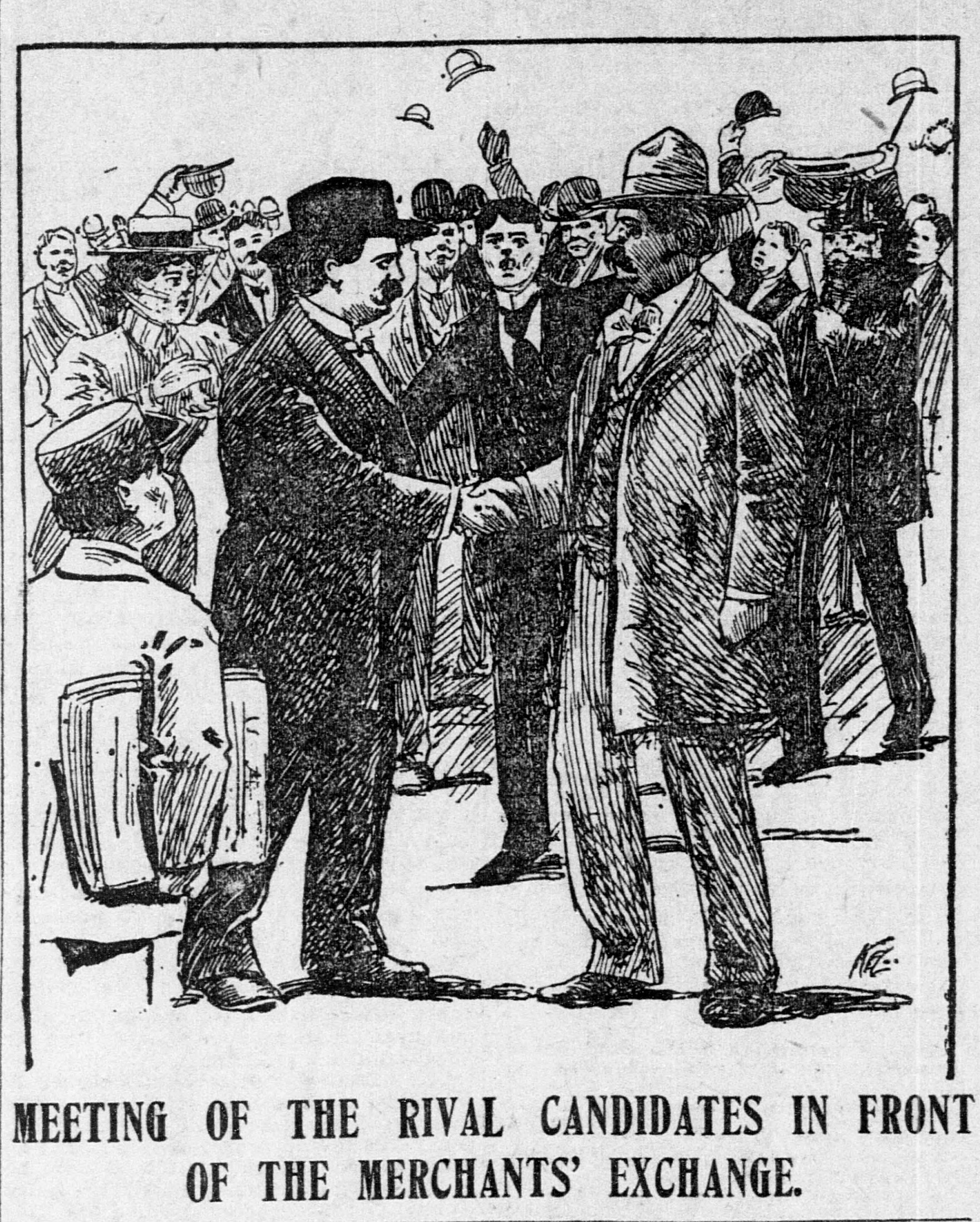
Maguire (left) shakes hands with his opponent, Republican Henry T. Gage, outside the Merchants Exchange Building in San Francisco, October 8, 1898

In 1898, Maguire ran for Governor of California on a Democratic-Populist-Silver Republican Fusion ticket. He ran on a platform of anti-monopolism, support for the war with Spain, and opposition to the War Revenue Act of 1898. He lost to Republican Henry T. Gage with 45% of the vote, having been opposed by every major newspaper save for William Randolph Hearst's San Francisco Examiner.

During the campaign, Maguire was denounced by Irish Catholic priest Peter Yorke for a book he wrote ten years prior, Ireland and The Pope, Adrian IV to Leo XIII, in which he argued that the subjugation of Ireland by the British Empire had been orchestrated by certain medieval Popes. Yorke's attacks were so severe that Patrick William Riordan, the Archbishop of San Francisco, had to distance himself, stating to the press: "Father Yorke is alone responsible for his utterances."

== Later career and death ==
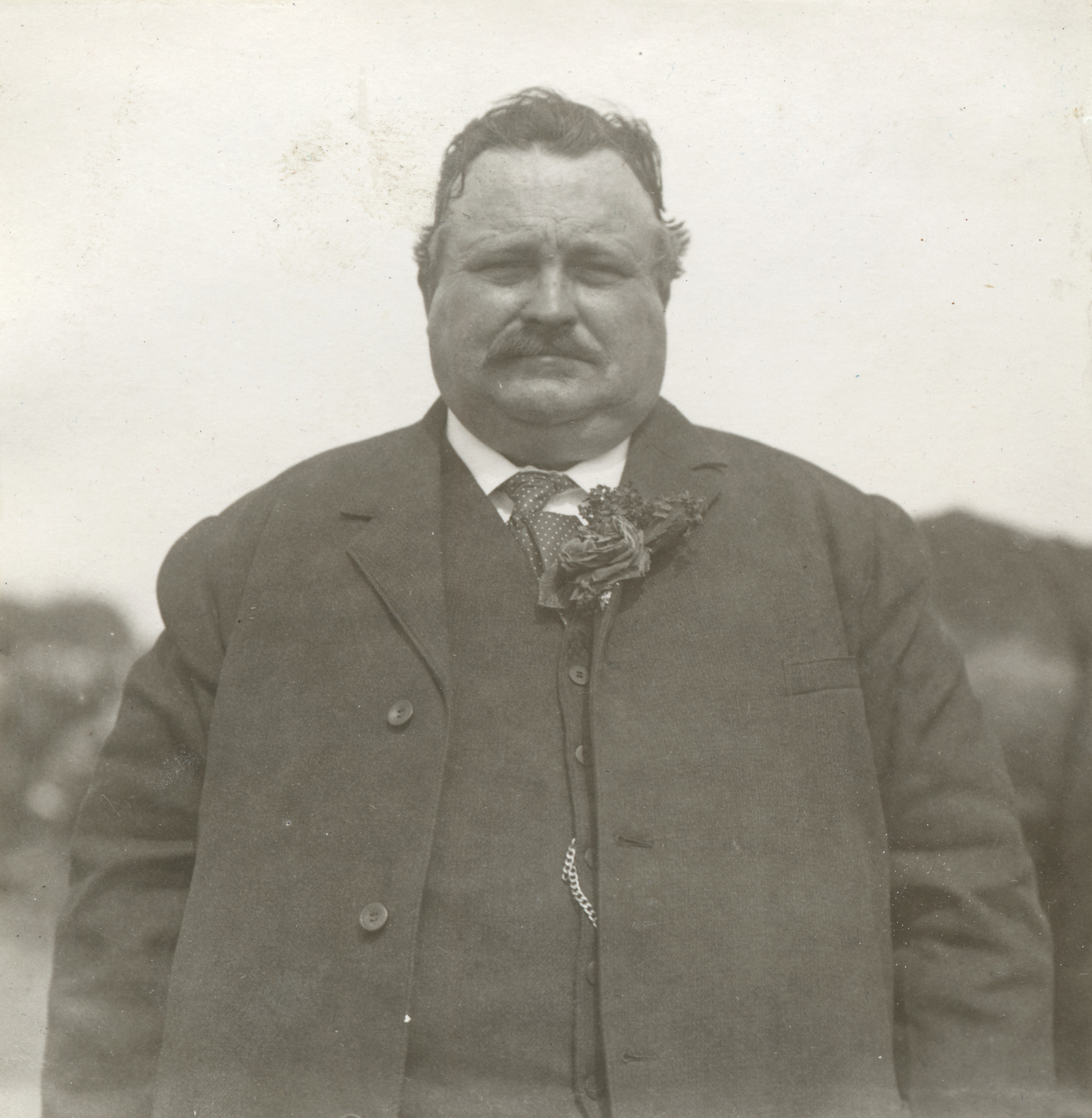
Maguire at Golden Gate Park, 1907

After his loss, Maguire resumed his law practice in San Francisco. He served as a delegate to the 1900 and 1912 Democratic National Conventions, pledged to speaker Champ Clark at the latter. Maguire did not seek re-election to the House until 1908, when he ran on a Democratic-Union Labor-Independence Fusion ticket but was defeated by incumbent Julius Kahn. He ran for public office one last time in 1911, campaigning for District Attorney of San Francisco but losing in the primary to incumbent Charles Fickert.

Maguire died in San Francisco on June 20, 1920. A member of the Independent Order of Odd Fellows since 1877, his funeral was directed by the organization. He is interred at Greenlawn Memorial Park in Colma, California. A liberty ship, James G. Maguire, was named for him and launched in 1943.

== Relationship with Henry George ==
Maguire (third row, eleventh from left) with Henry George (third row, ninth from left) at the First National Single Tax Conference at the Cooper Union in Manhattan, New York, September 3, 1890

Maguire was a close friend and follower of the economist and philosopher Henry George. Writing in 1909, Maguire recalled their first meeting as follows:

I first met Henry George in the Spring of 1873 and became attracted to him by reason of his masterly exposition, in his pamphlet, "Our Land and Land Policy," of the fraudulent methods by which the public lands of our country had been diverted from the people to the speculators, an evil of that period from the ruinous effects of which my immediate family had then recently suffered severely.

At our first meeting I told him that I had read and admired his pamphlet; and, at that time and for two years afterwards, I really thought that I had read it. I had, in fact, read "Part I" (the historical part) only and had merely glanced at the theoretical part, in which Mr. George had suggested his idea of a remedy for land monopoly.

— James G. Maguire, San Francisco Star, August 21, 1909

After Maguire was elected to the State Assembly, George suggested that Maguire do something "to force our theory upon the attention of the public," at which point Maguire was forced to admit he had not read the second part of George's pamphlet. George didn't blame him, and the two agreed to discuss it further after the legislature was adjourned. Although Maguire initially opposed the single tax theory, likening it to theft, George convinced him by asking:

"How long do you think this world is going to last? Do you think that mankind should continue to suffer this great wrong, through all the future ages of the world, simply because, through ignorance, it has been permitted to exist during the lives of a few generations of men?"

In 1878, Maguire was a founding member of the Land Reform League of California, "the first organisation of any kind in the world to propagate Henry George's ideas." George and other friends met in Maguire's law office to discuss the economic aspects of "Our Land and Land Policy," and George later consulted Maguire while writing Progress and Poverty. Maguire went on to establish himself as a leading single taxer, and after George's death came to be known as the "patriarch of the movement."

== Caricature gallery ==
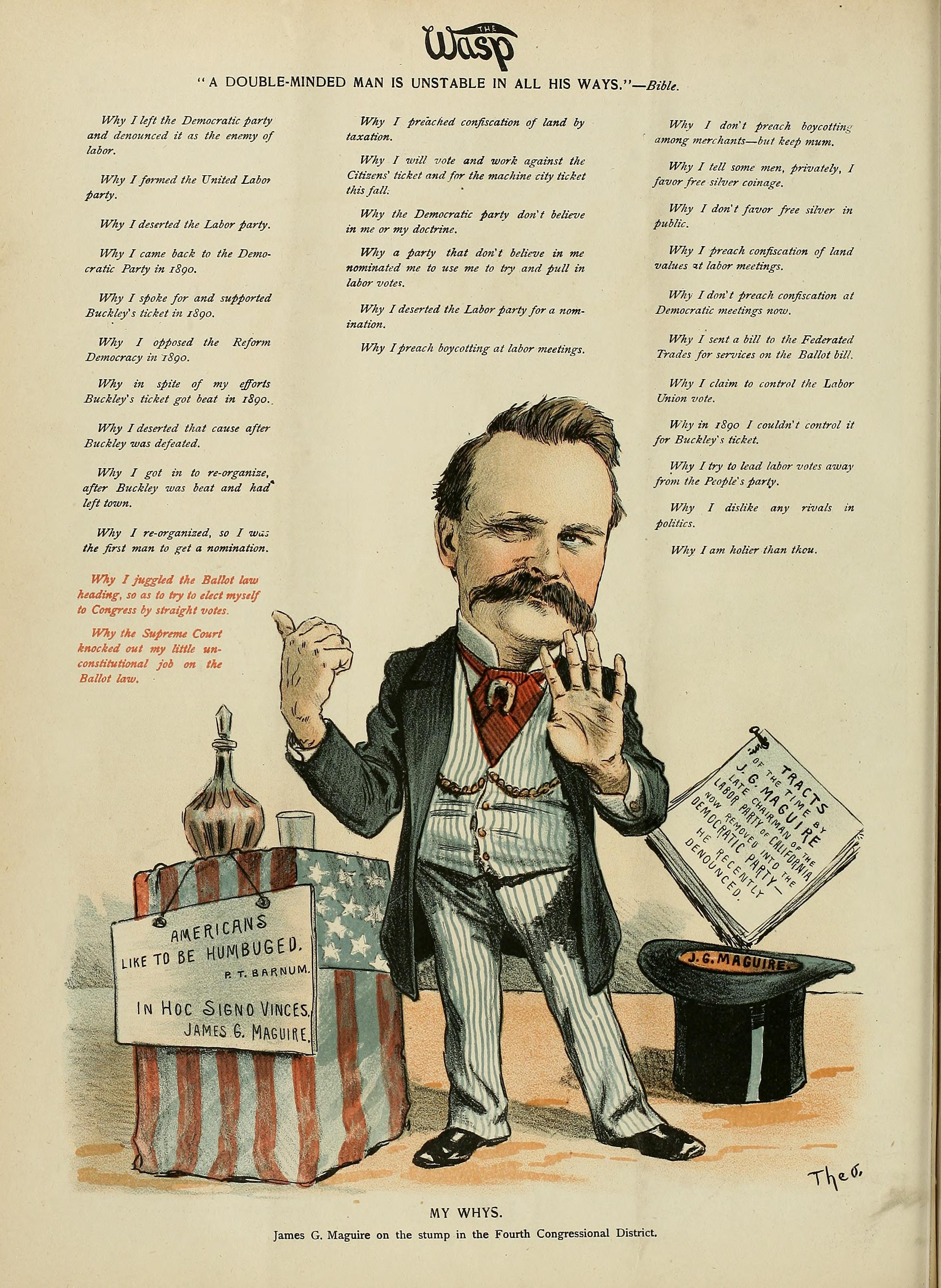
"My Whys"

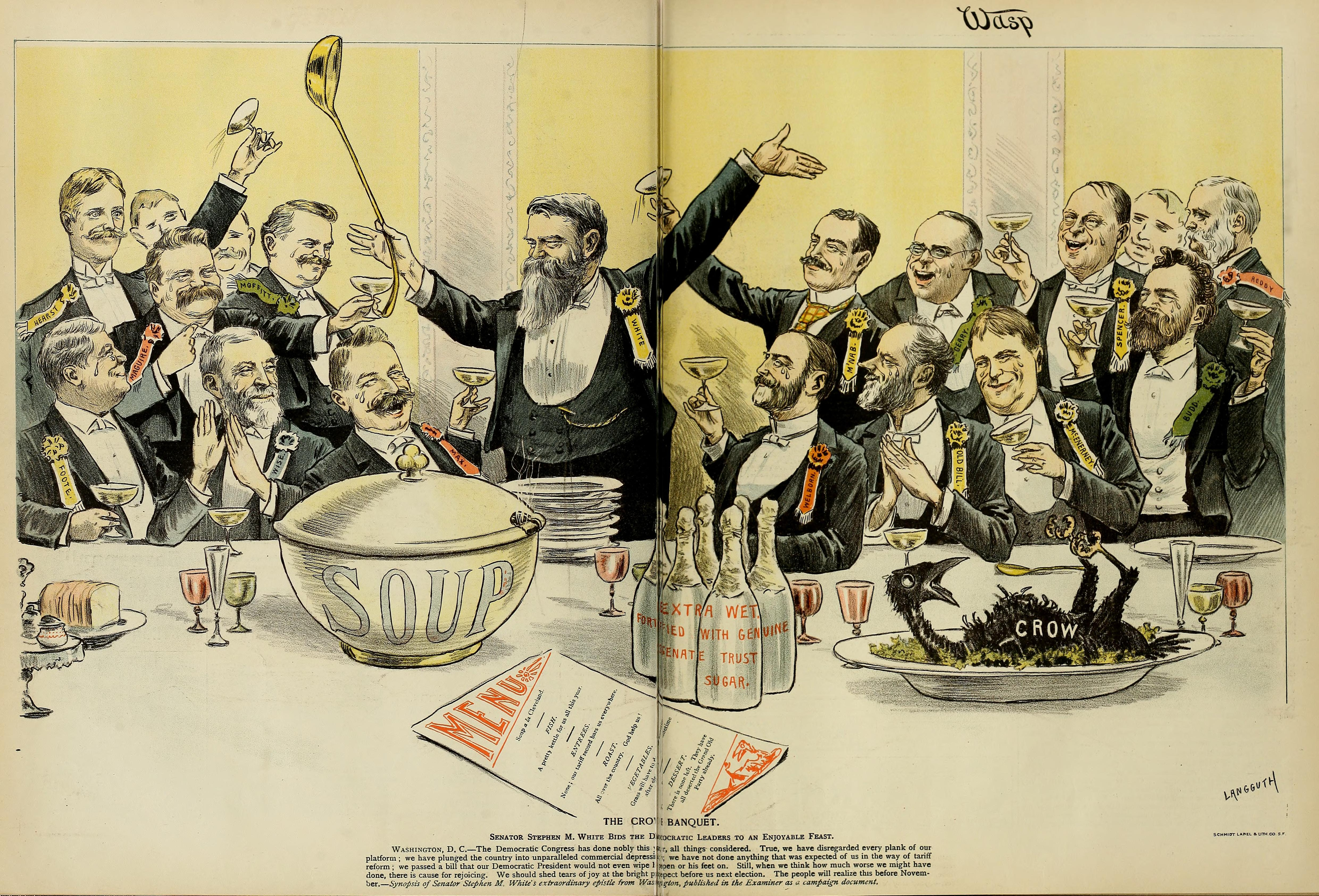
"The Crow Banquet"

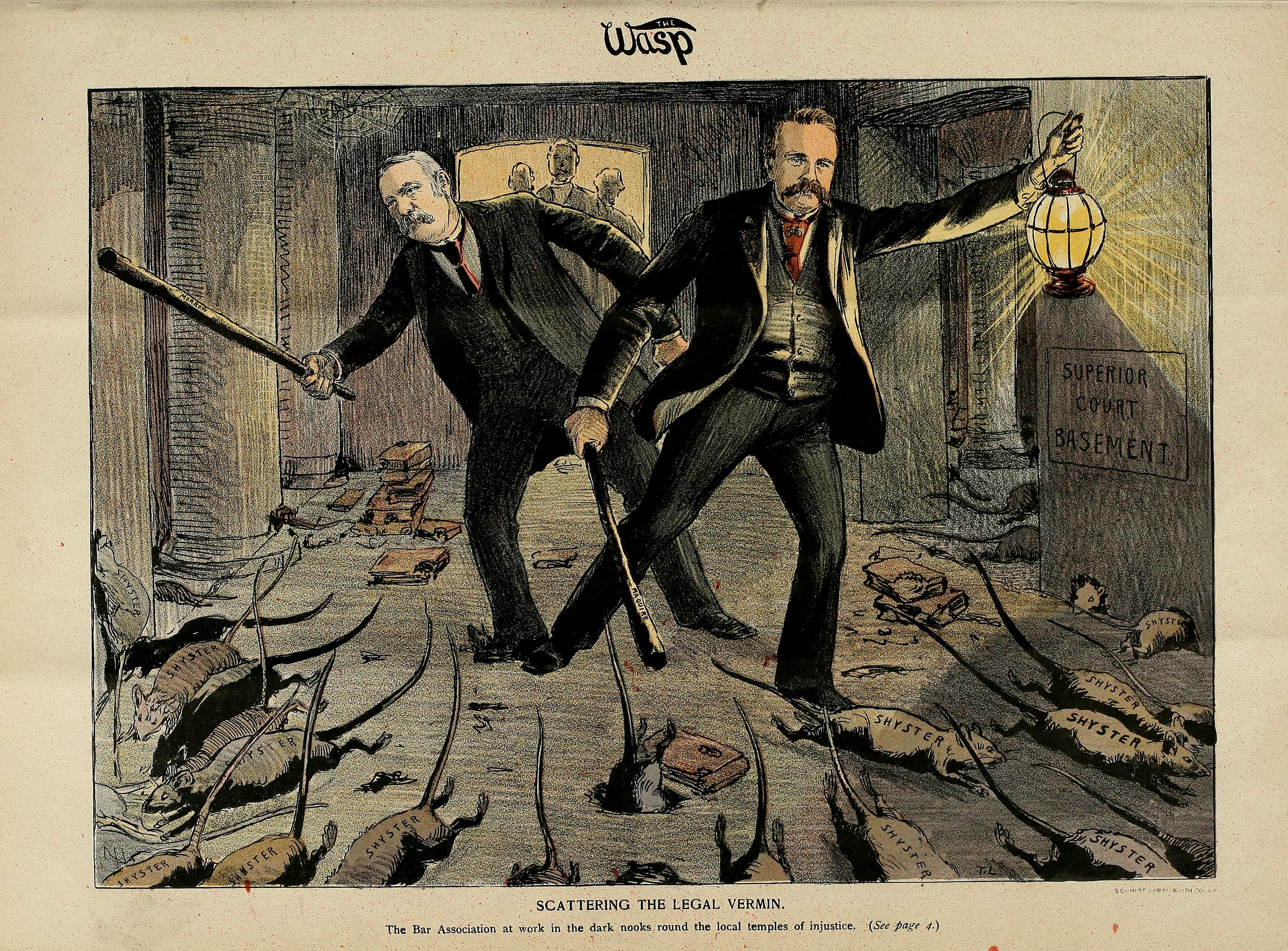
"Scattering the Legal Vermin"

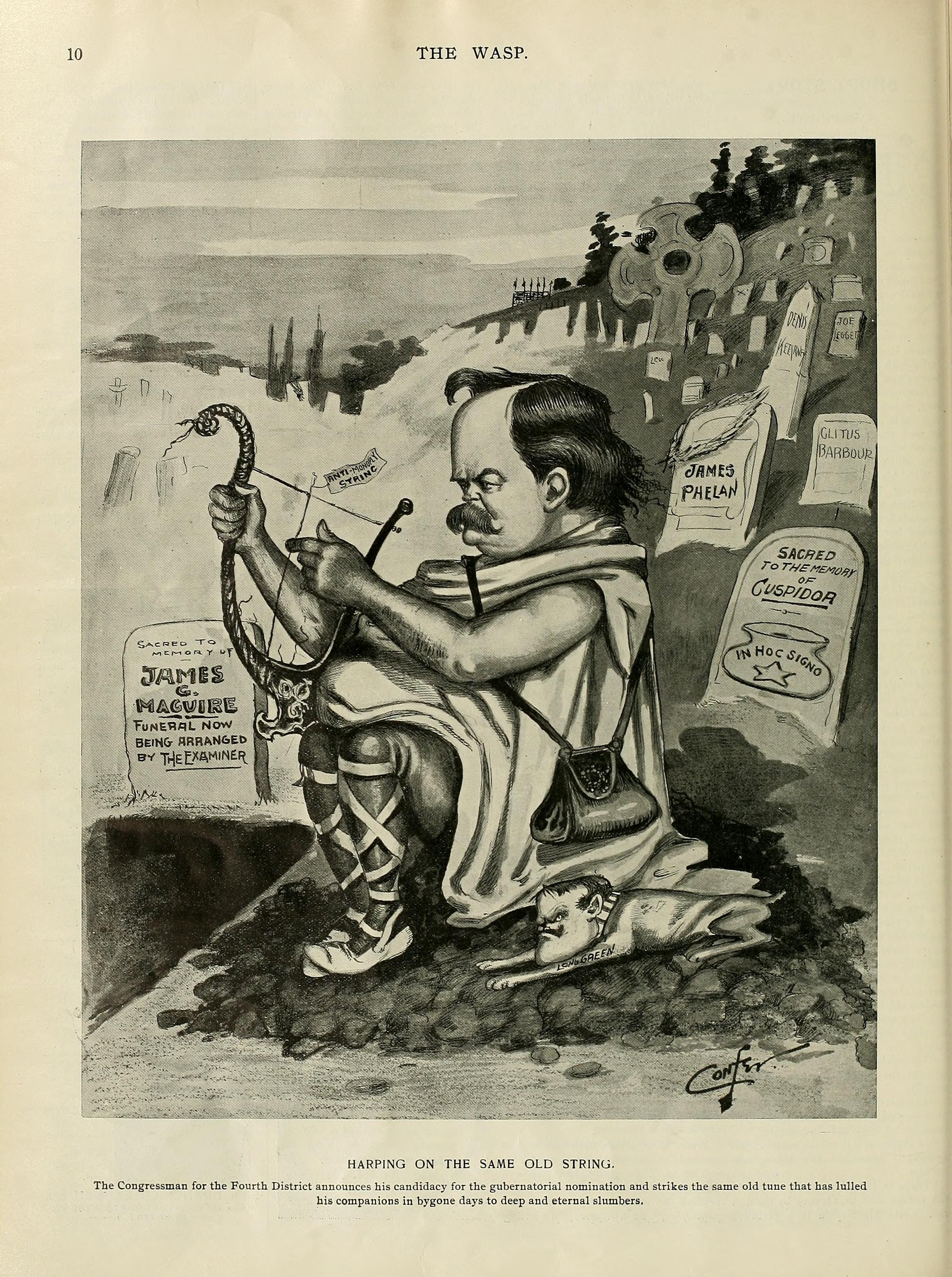
"Harping on the Same Old String"

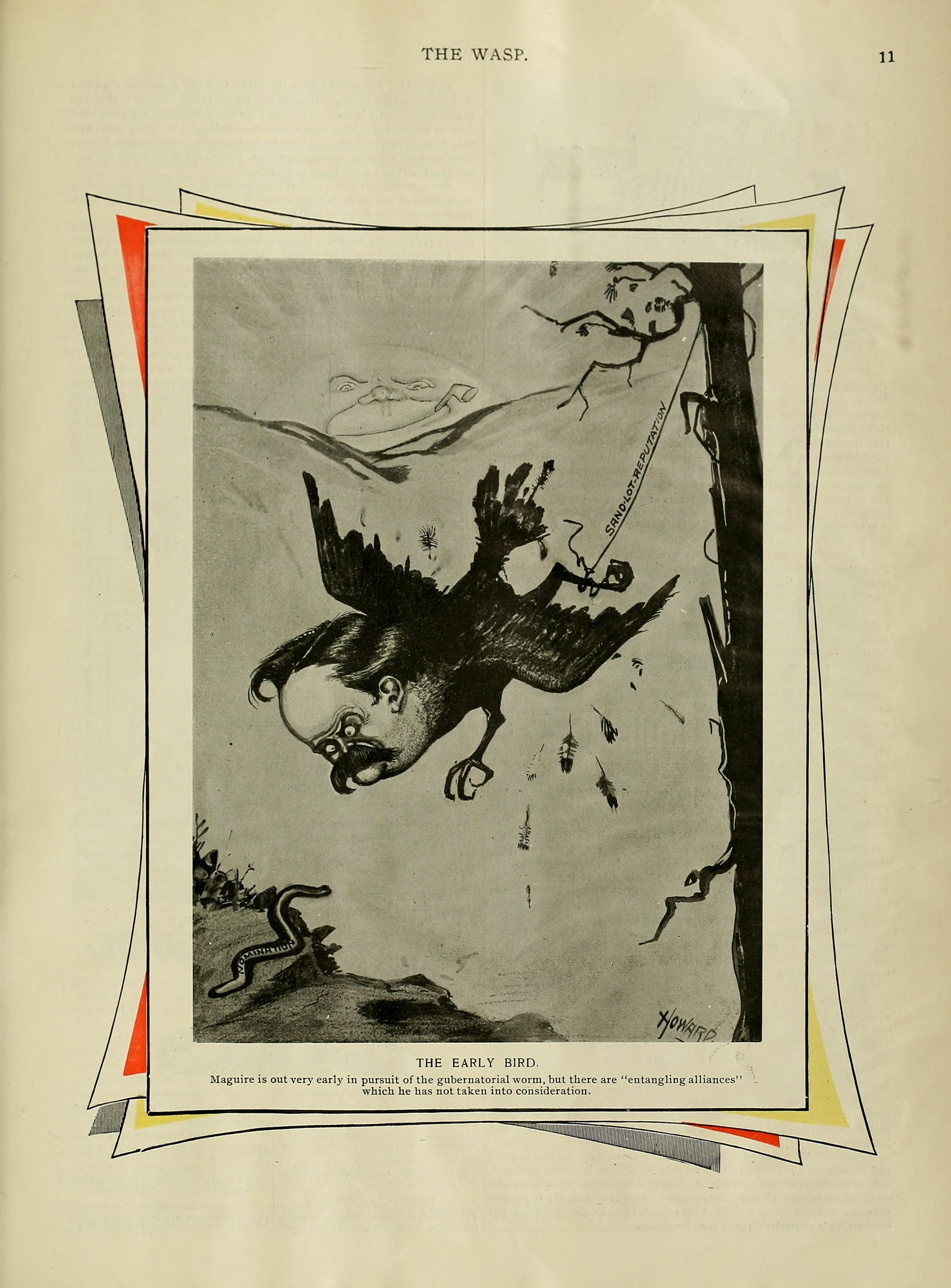
"The Early Bird"

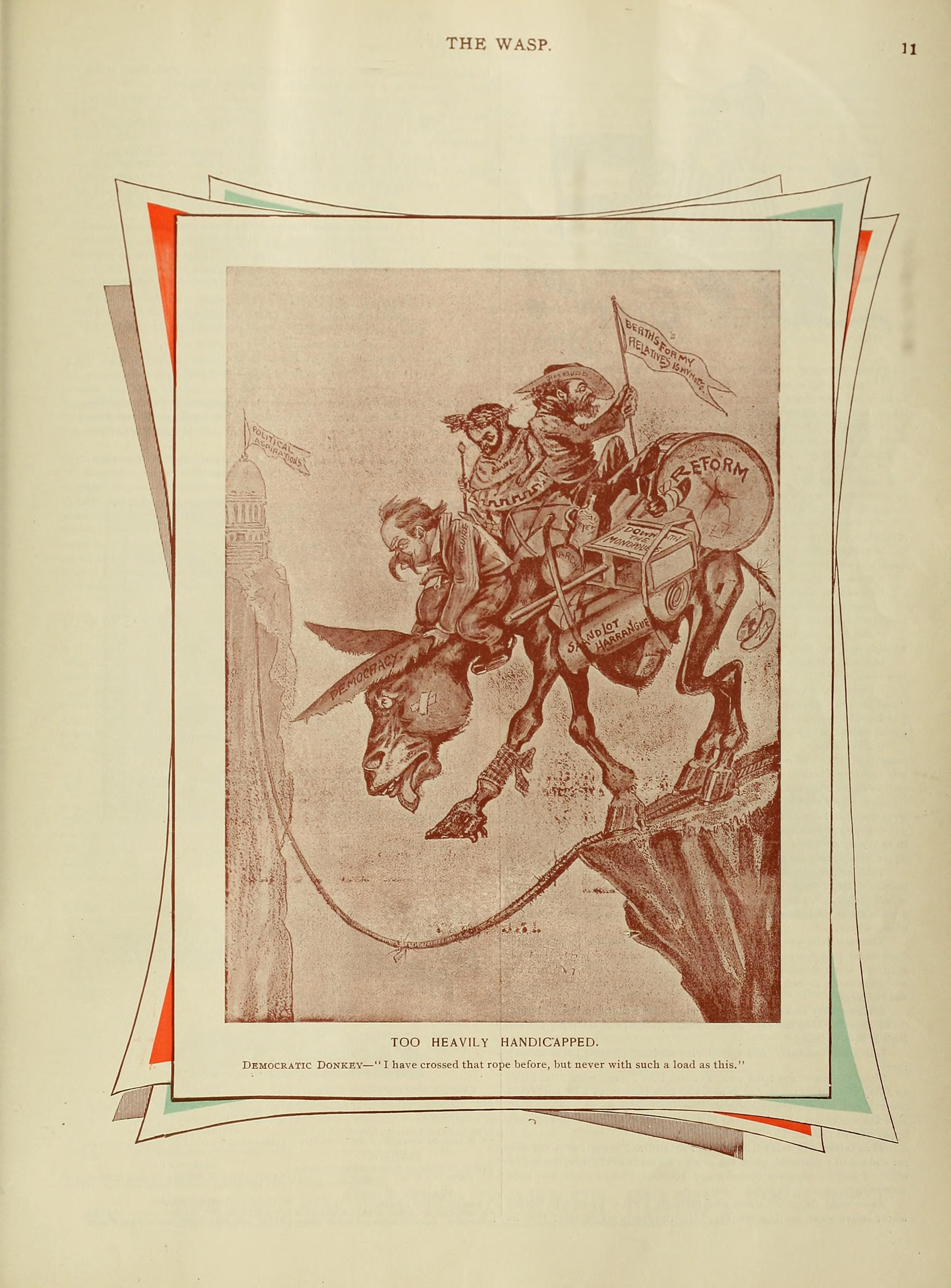
"Too Heavily Handicapped"

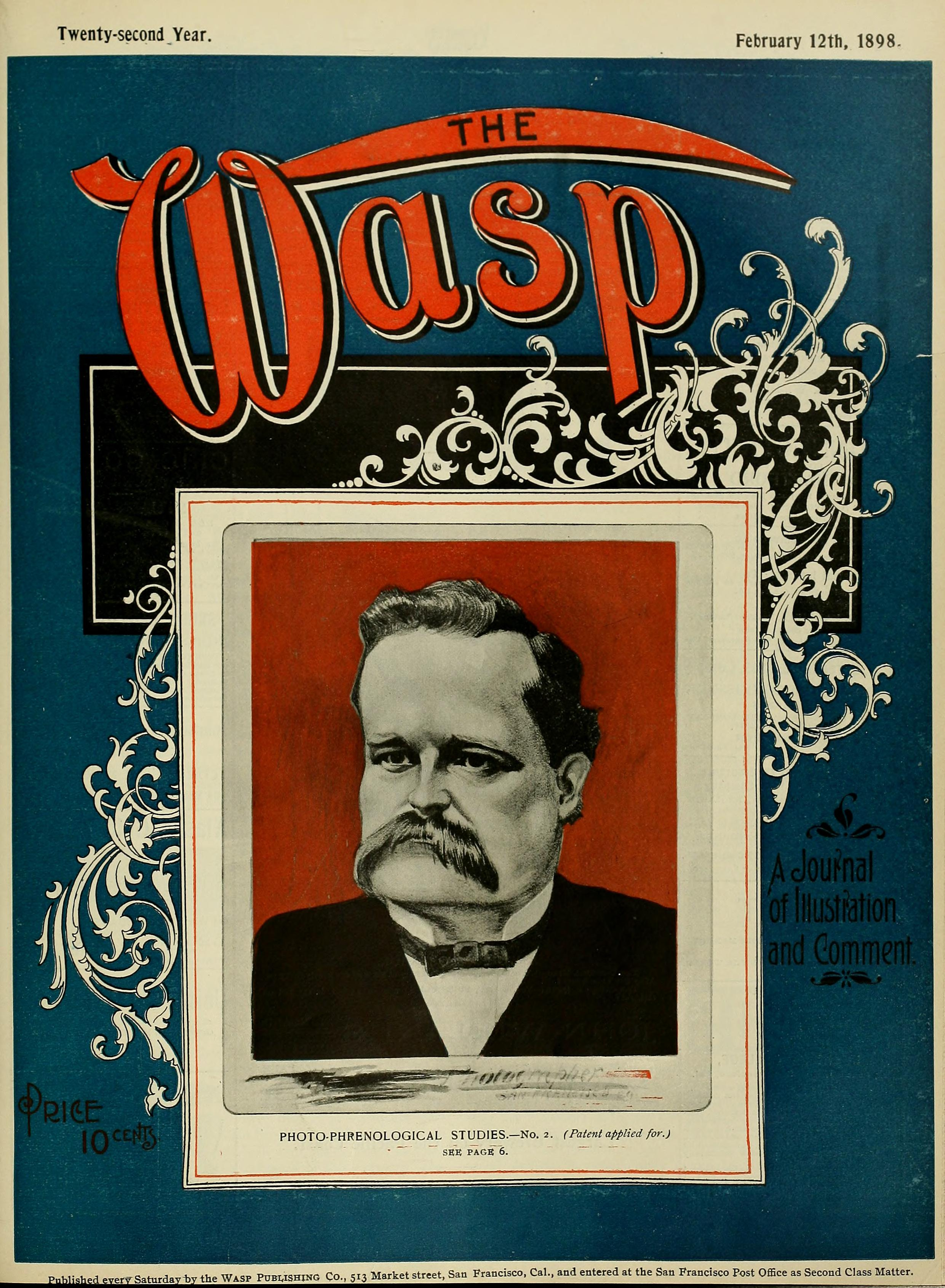
"Photo-Phrenological Studies"

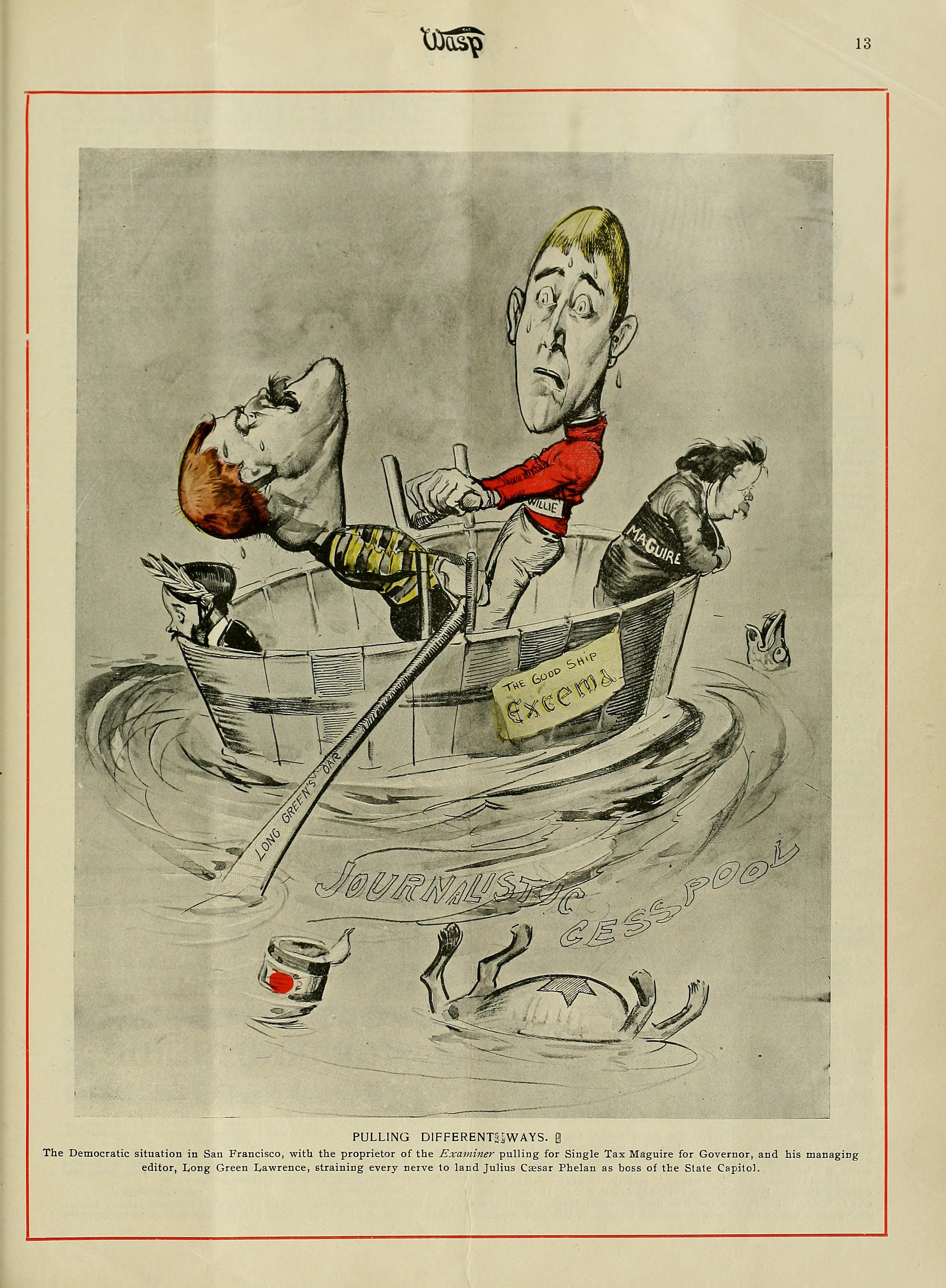
"Pulling Different Ways"

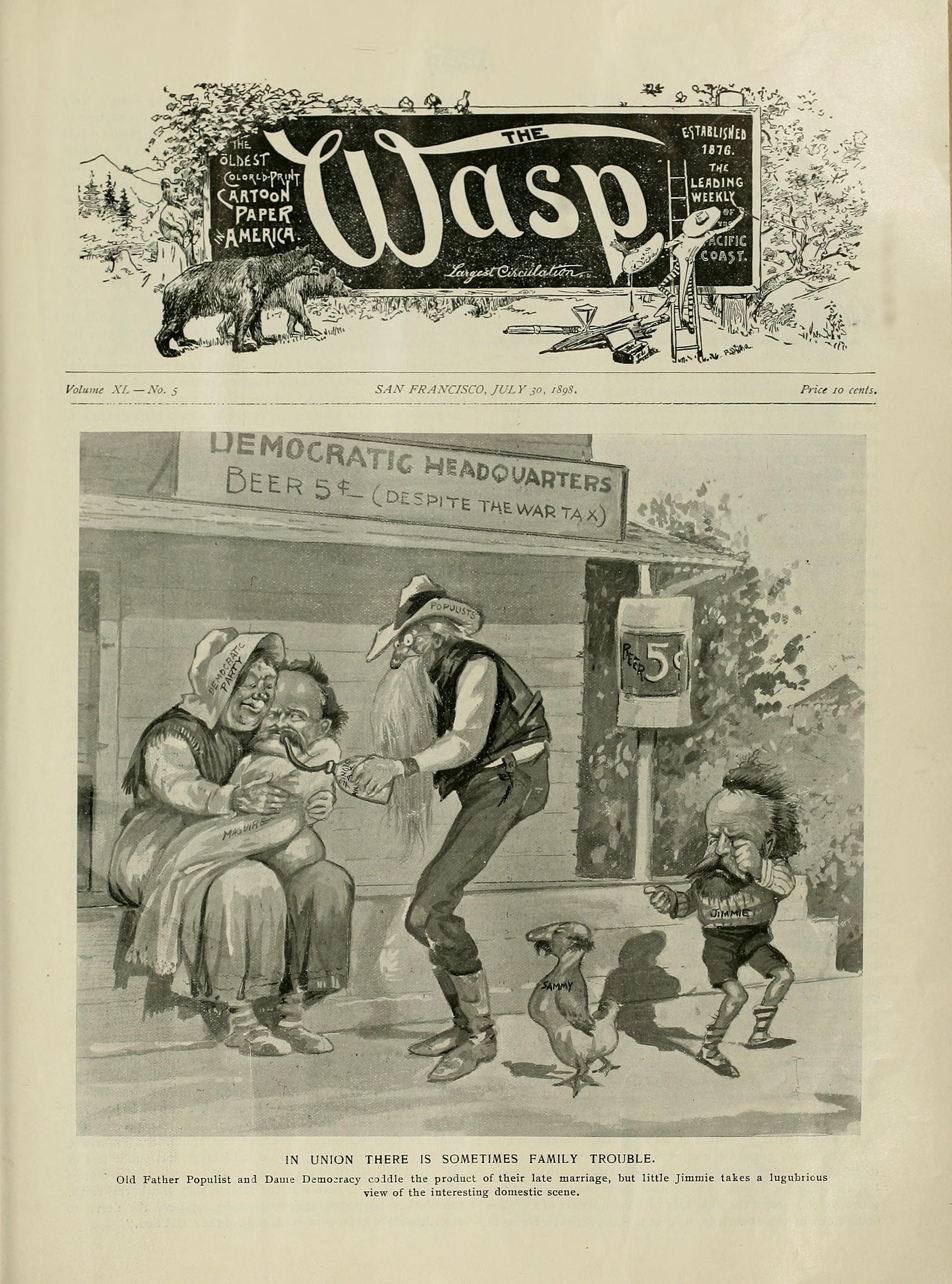
"In Union There is Sometimes Family Trouble"

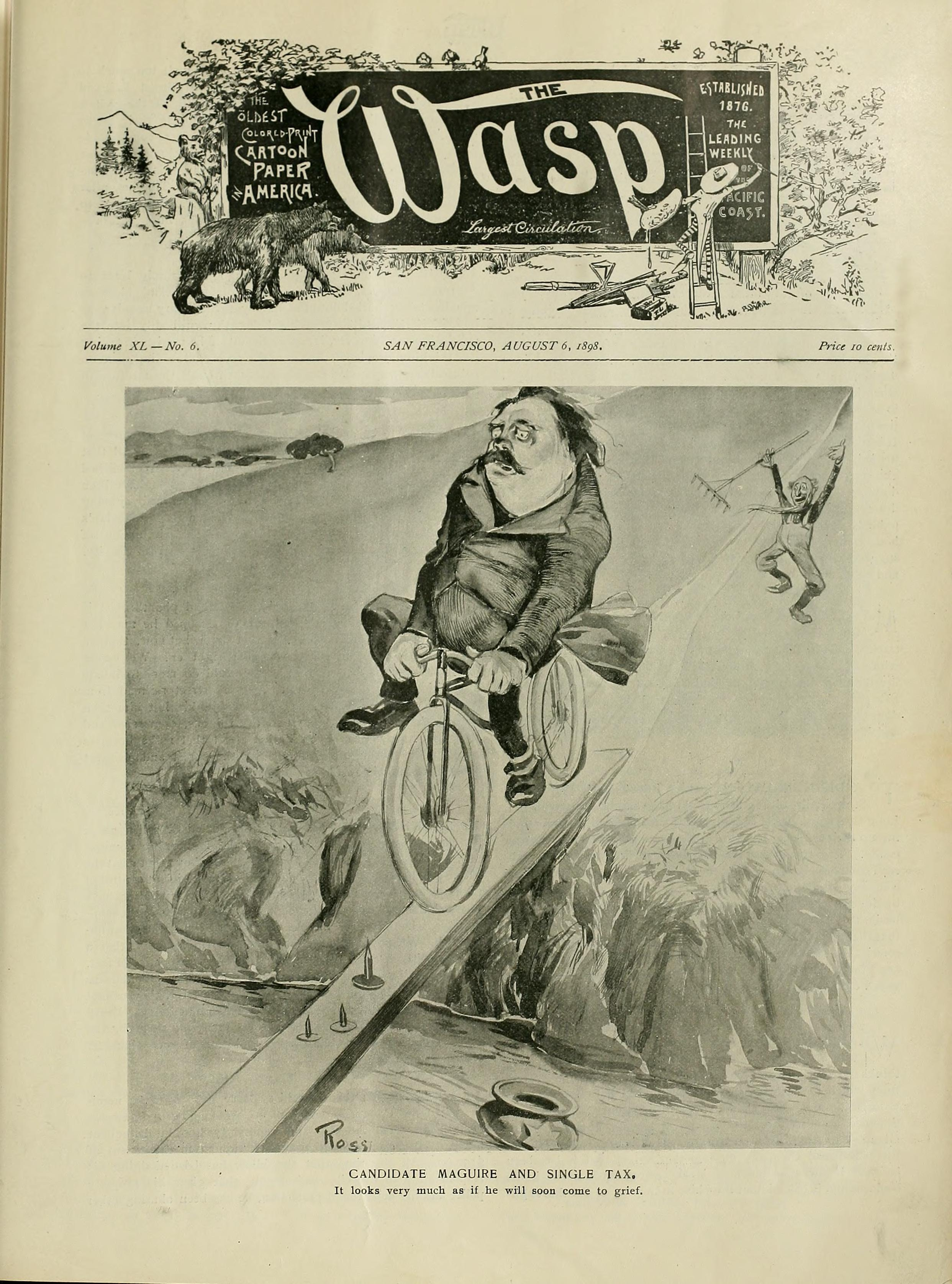
"Candidate Maguire and Single Tax"

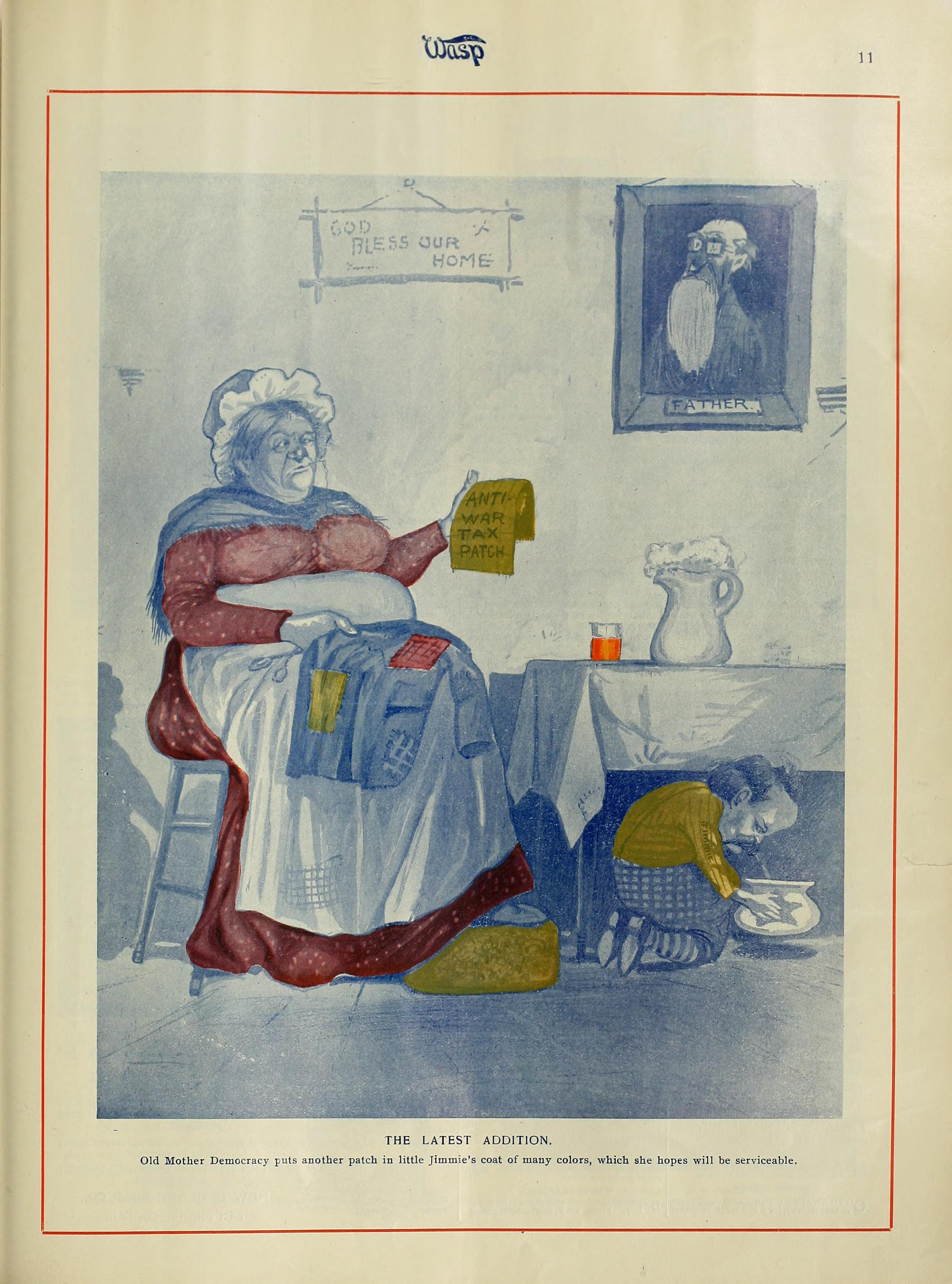
"The Latest Addition"

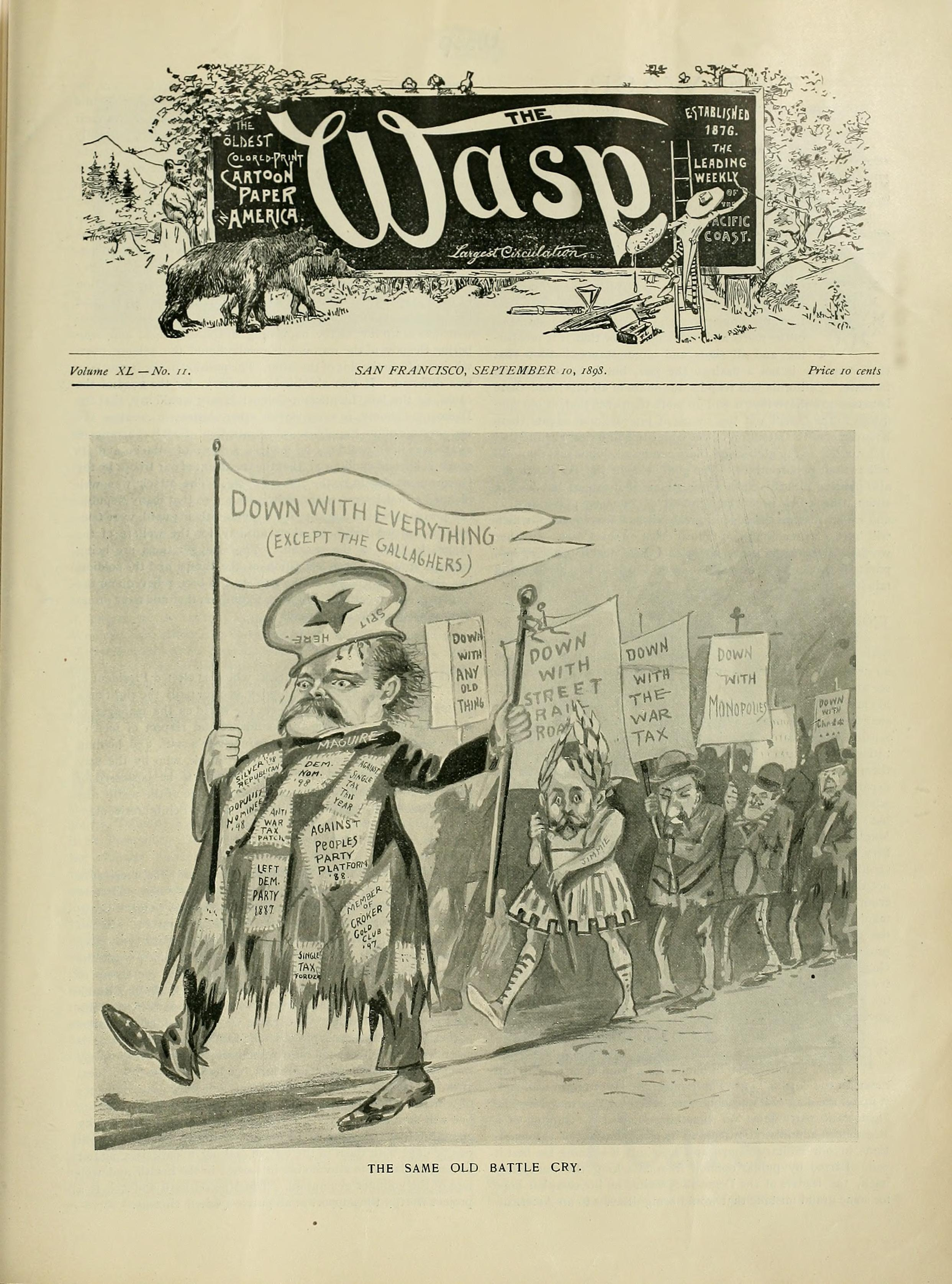
"The Same Old Battle Cry"

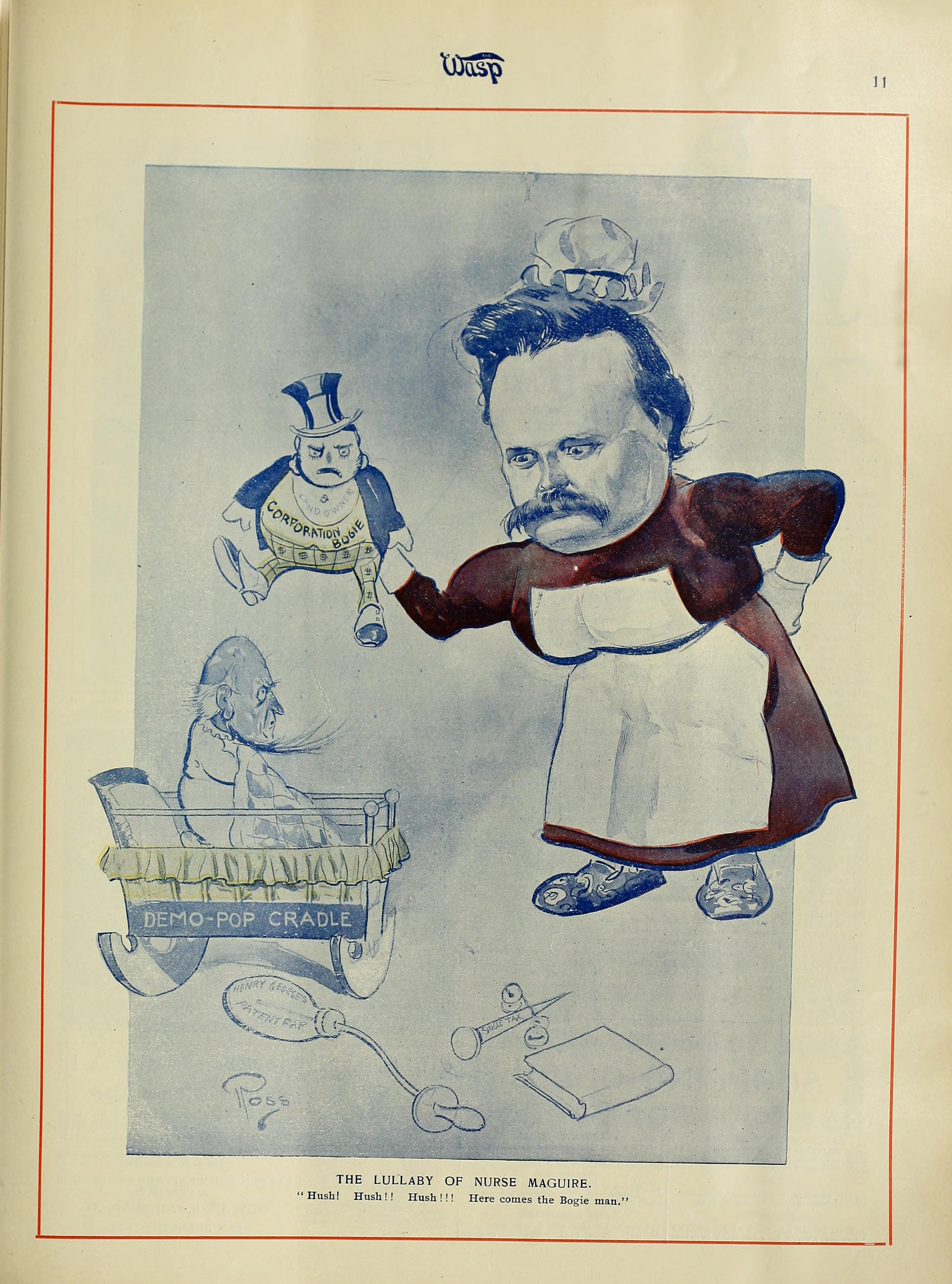
"The Lullaby of Nurse Maguire"

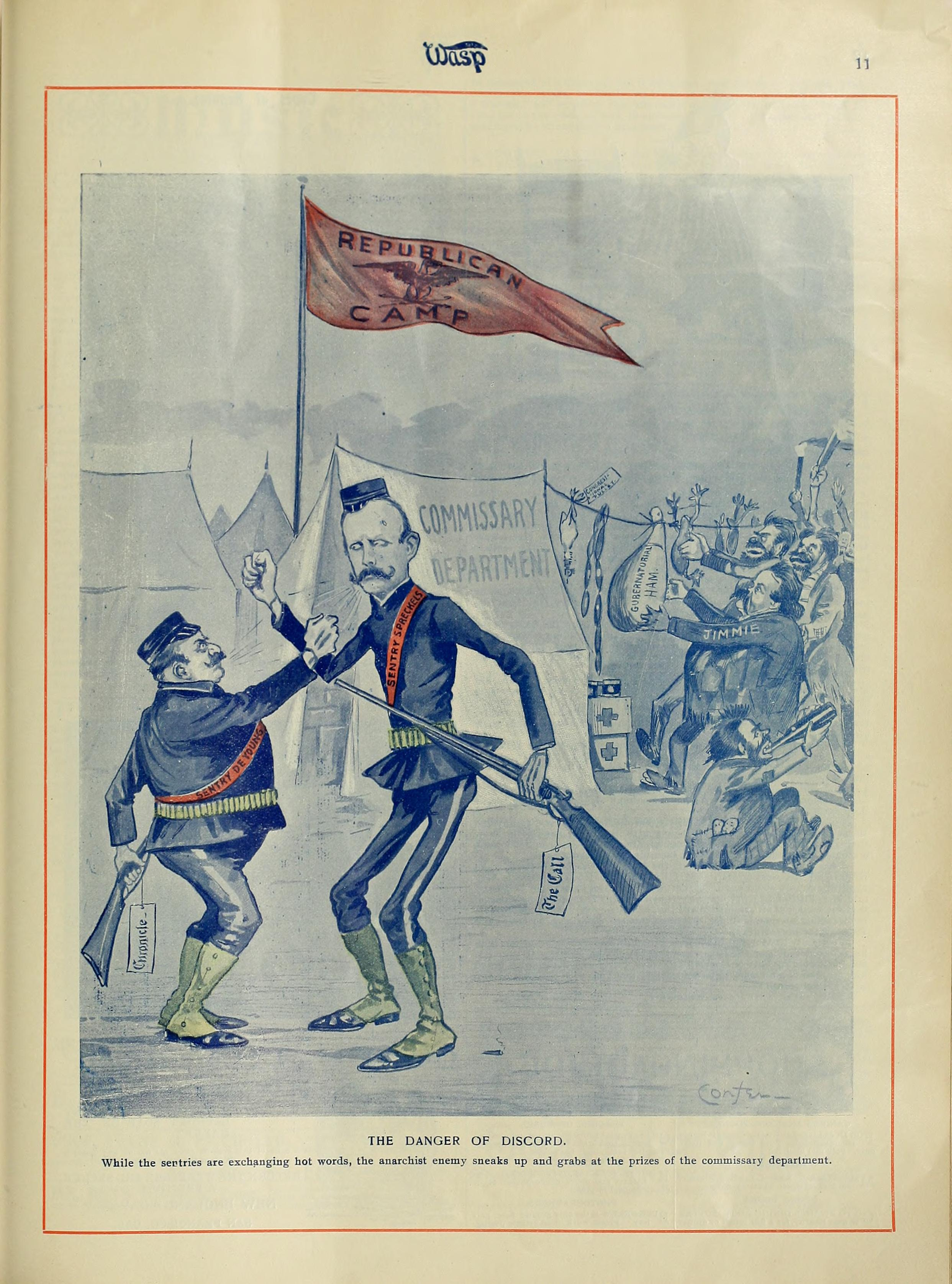
"The Danger of Discord"

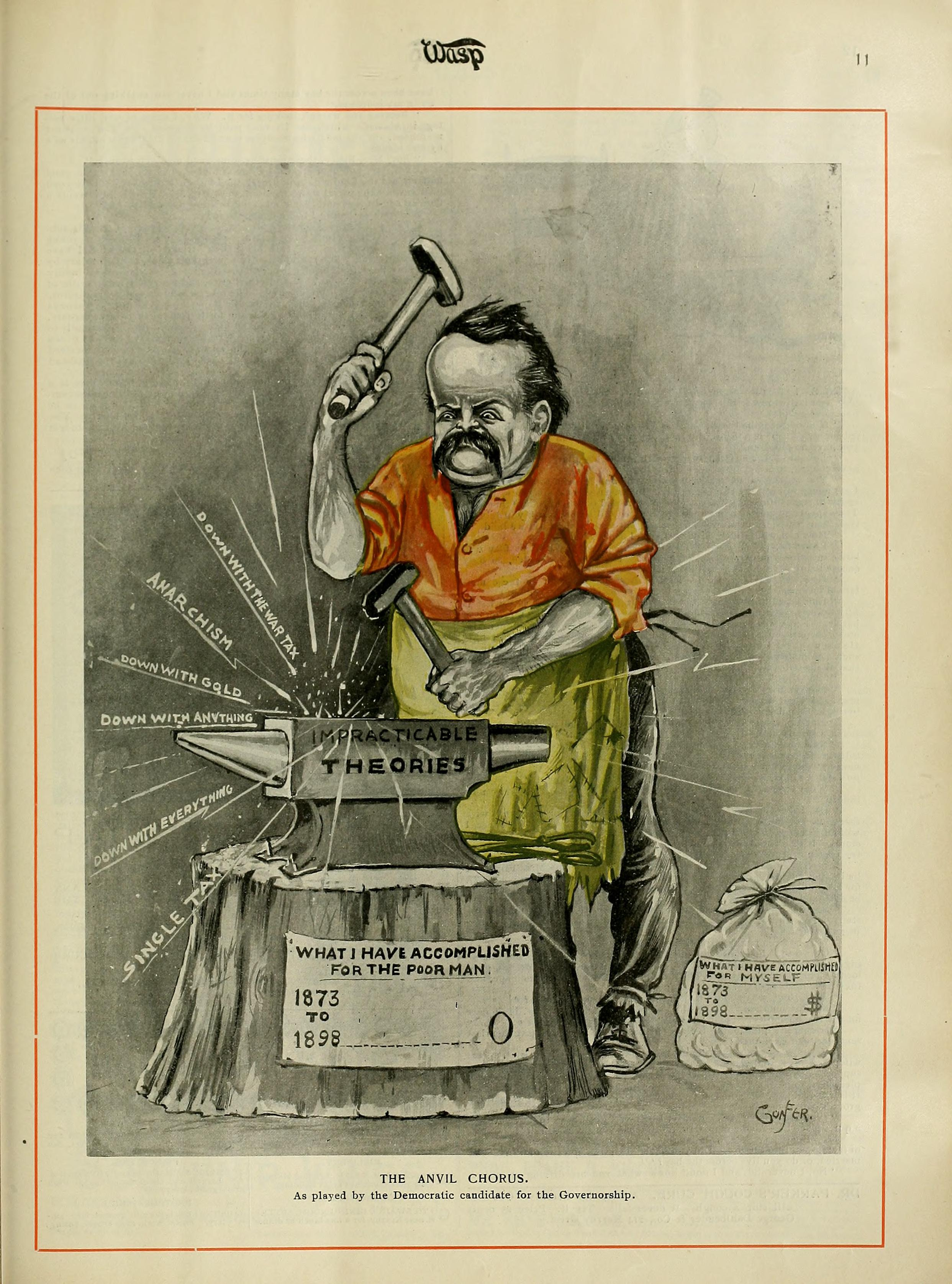
"The Anvil Chorus"

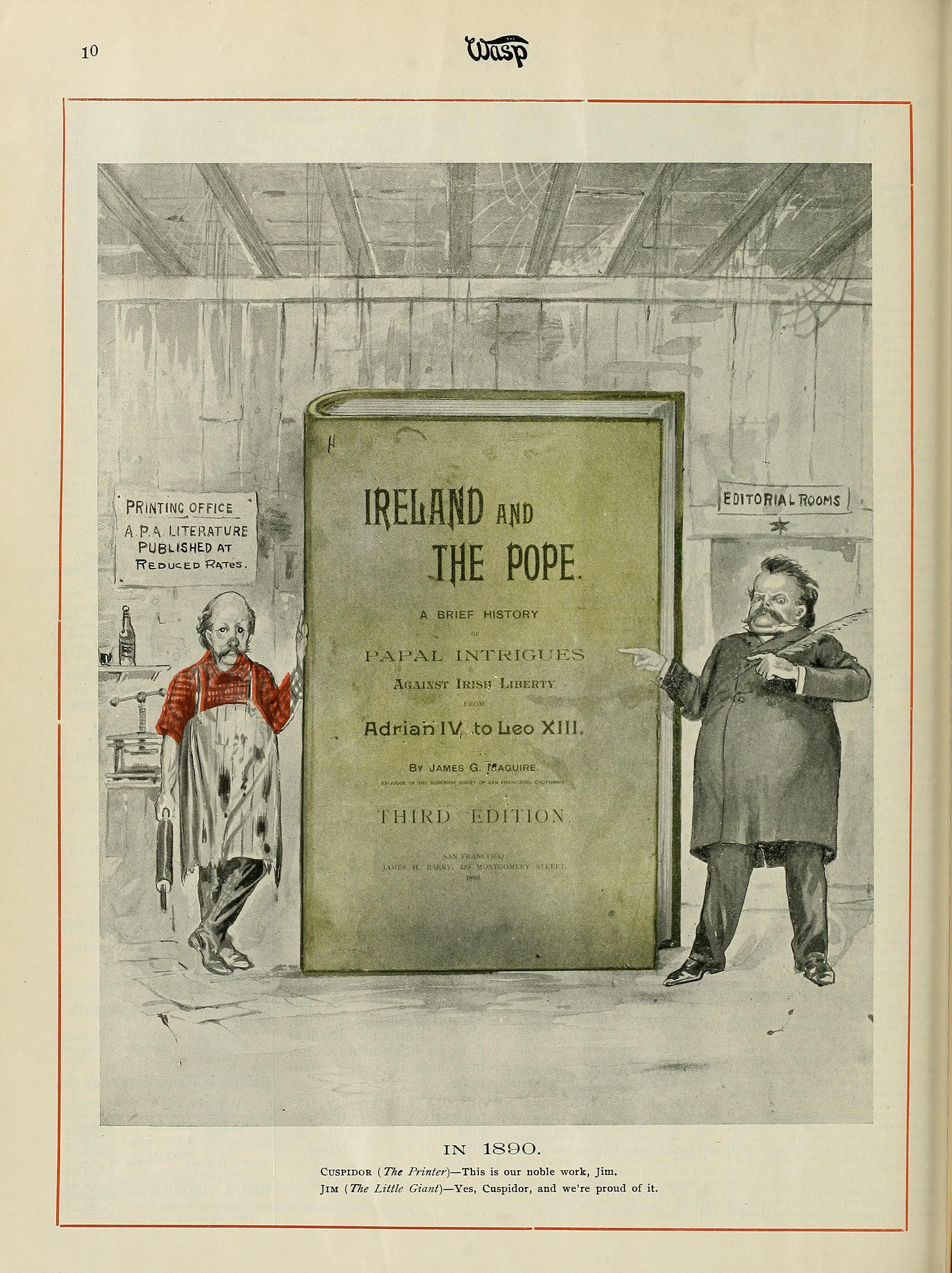
"In 1890"

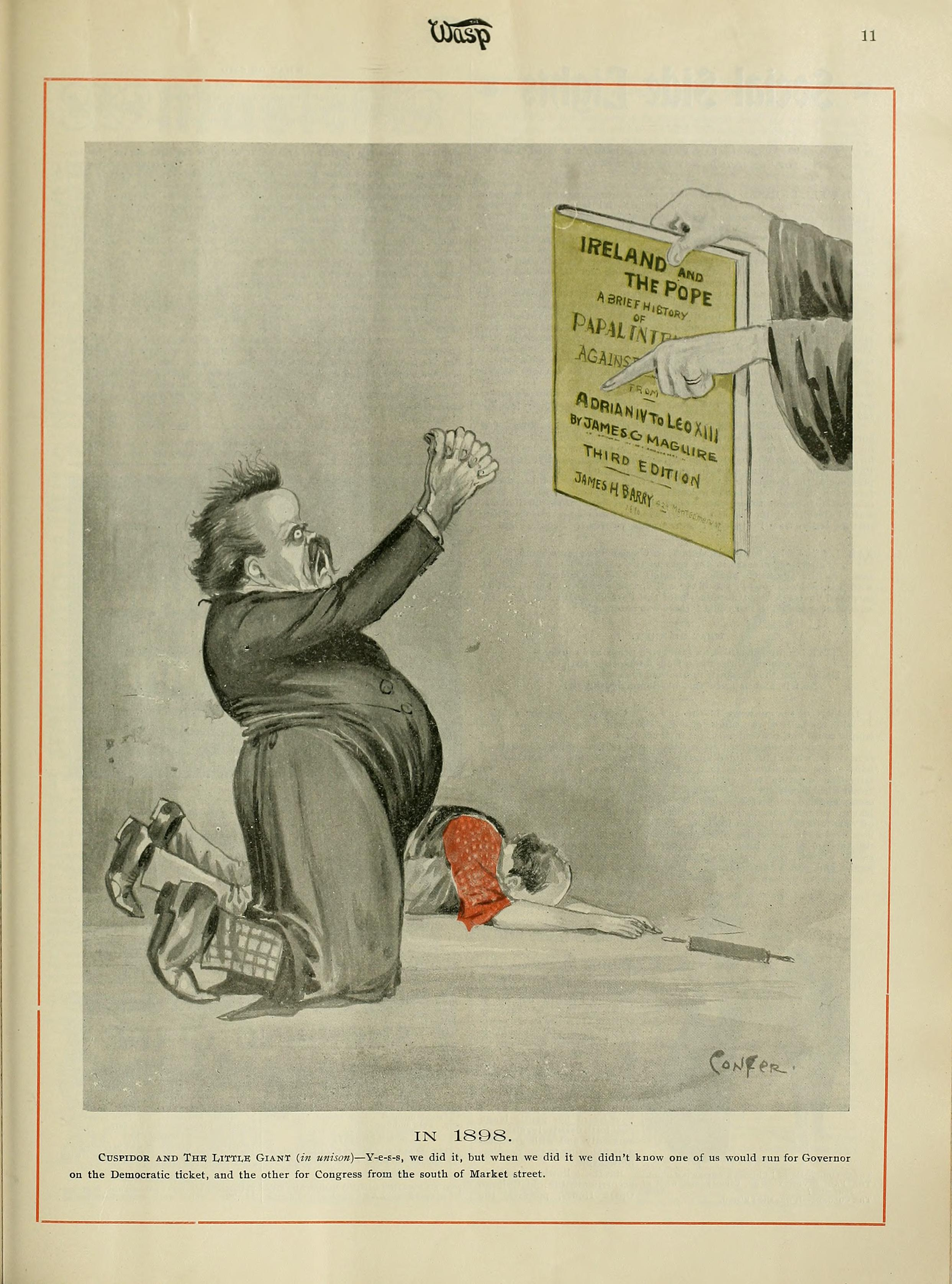
"In 1898"

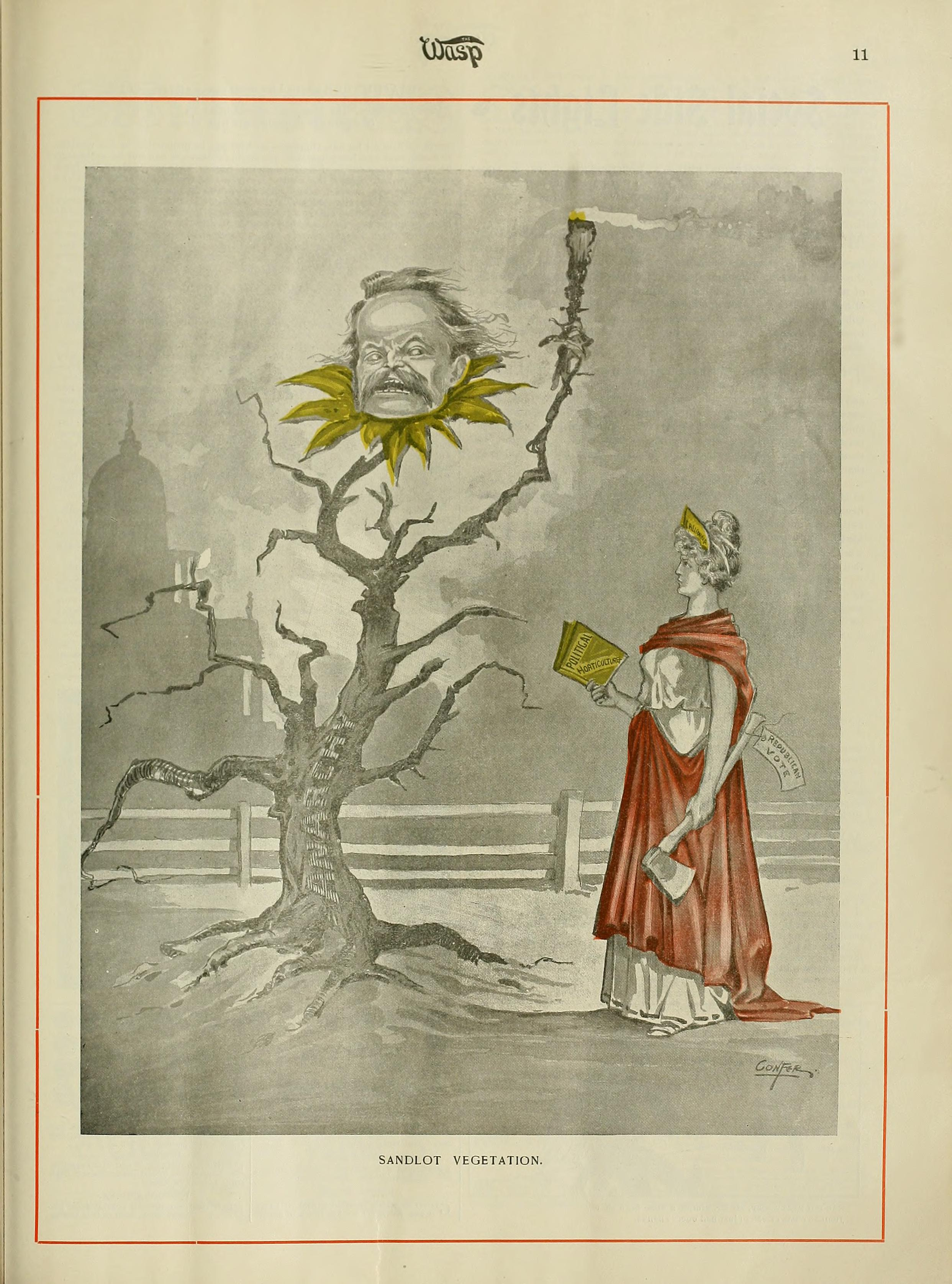
"Sandlot Vegetation"

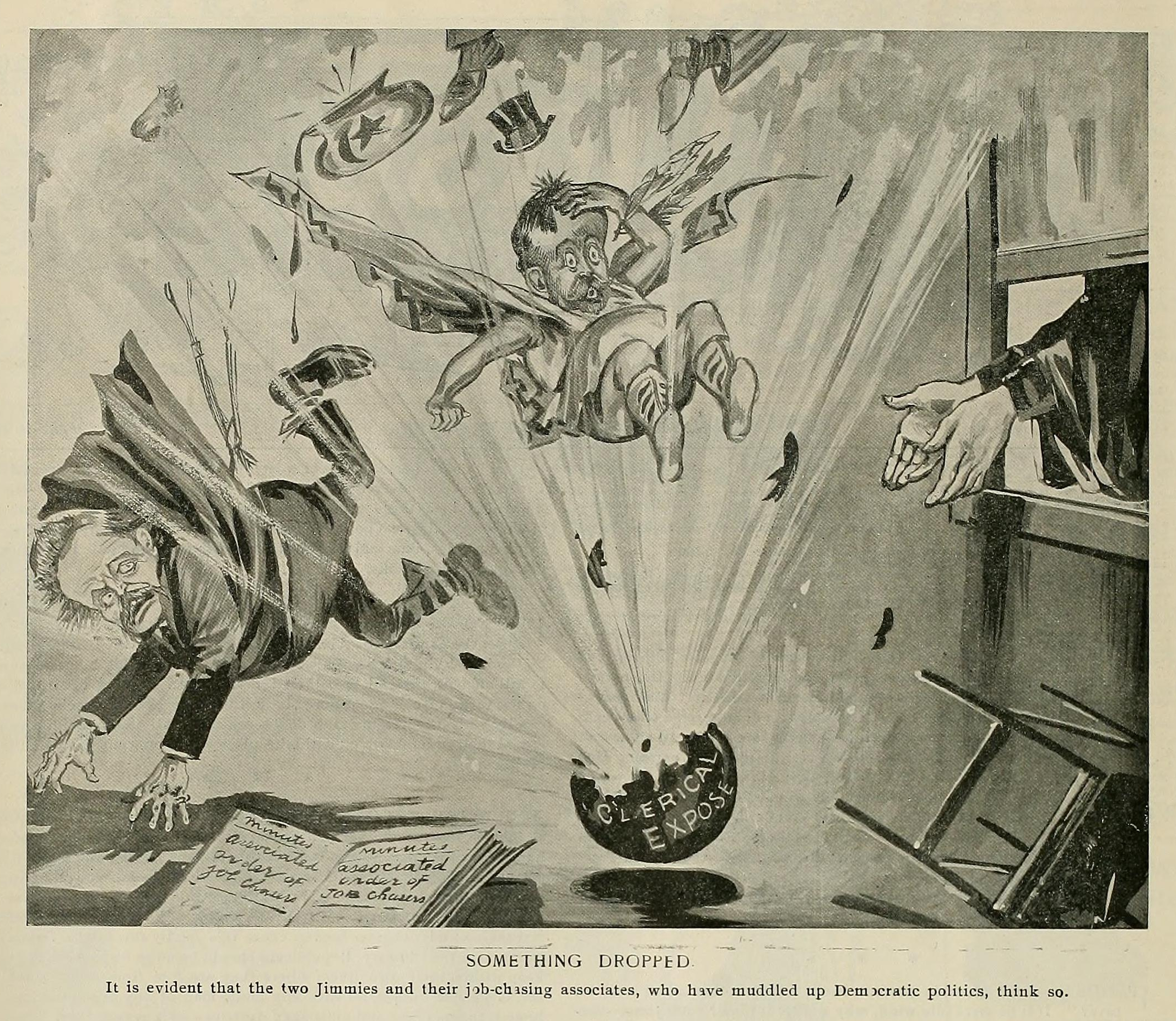
"Something Dropped"

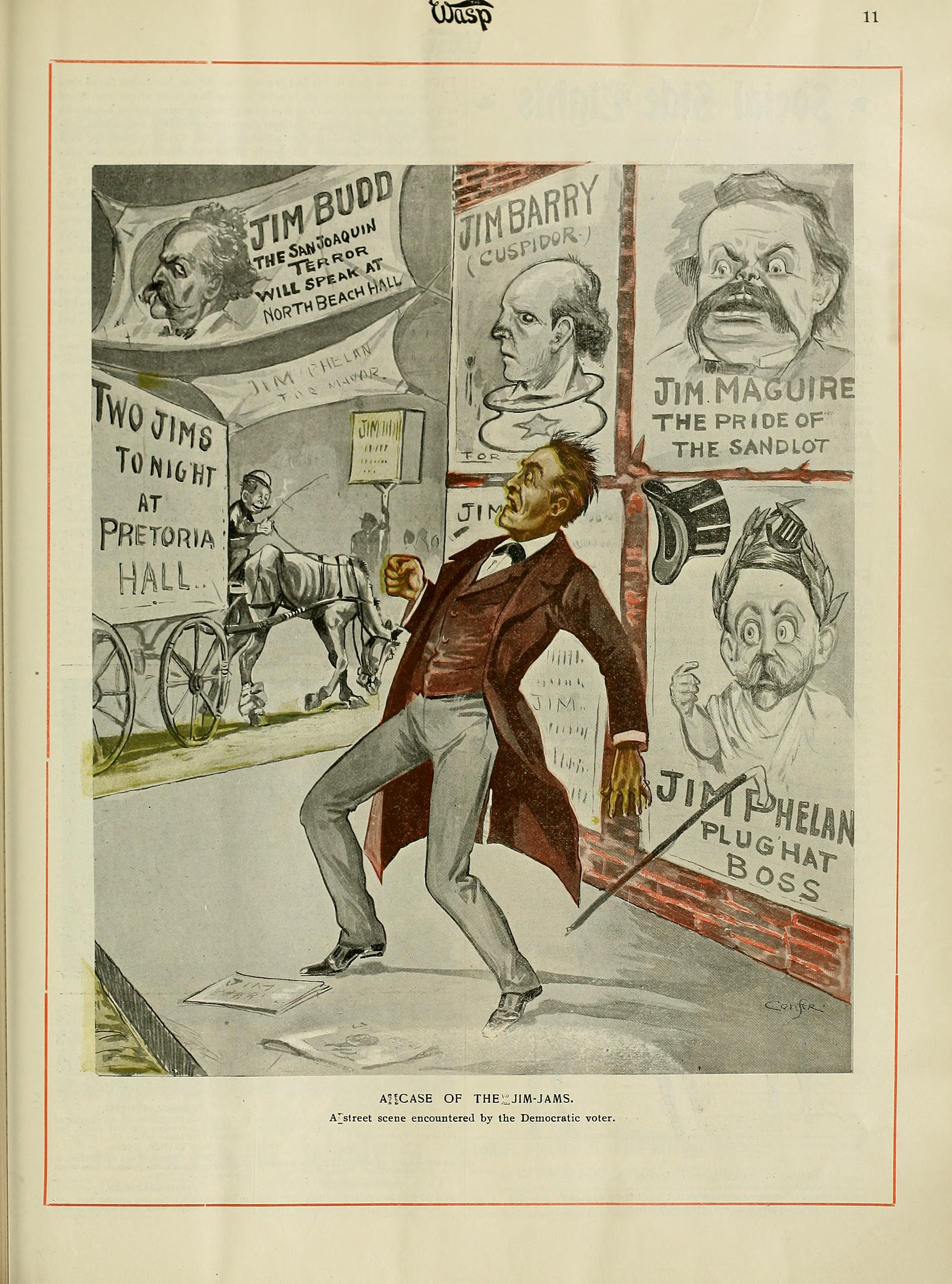
"A Case of the Jim-Jams"

== Electoral history ==
1875 California State Assembly 13th district election
Party	Candidate	Votes	%
Democratic	James G. Maguire	2,075	12.6
Democratic	Frederick G. Raisch	1,968	12.0
Democratic	Frederick A. Pullen	1,925	11.7
Democratic	D. C. Sullivan	1,860	11.3
Independent	H. C. Squires	1,336	8.1
Republican	John Graham	1,250	7.6
Independent	M. Blair	1,149	7.0
Republican	J. M. Stockman	1,102	6.7
Independent	C. G. Moxley	1,096	6.7
Republican	William Robinson	1,080	6.6
Republican	William Ede	1,044	6.6
Independent	W. E. Stewart	534	3.3
Total votes		16,419	100.0
Turnout			

1882 San Francisco County Superior Court election
Party	Candidate	Votes	%
Democratic	James V. Coffey	22,986	14.9
Democratic	James G. Maguire	21,513	13.9
Democratic	F. M. Clough	20,840	13.5
Democratic	D. J. Toohy	19,990	12.9
Republican	James A. Waymire	18,799	12.2
Republican	Columbus Bartlett	17,051	11.0
Republican	James M. Allen	16,852	10.9
Republican	J. M. Troutt	16,612	10.7
Total votes		154,643	100.0
Turnout			

1892 United States House of Representatives elections
Party	Candidate	Votes	%
Democratic	James G. Maguire	14,997	49.2
Republican	Charles O. Alexander	13,226	43.4
Populist	Edgar P. Burman	1,980	6.5
Prohibition	Henry Collins	296	1.0
Total votes		30,499	100.0
Turnout			
Democratic gain from Republican			

1894 United States House of Representatives elections
Party	Candidate	Votes	%
Democratic	James G. Maguire (Incumbent)	14,748	48.3
Republican	Thomas B. Shannon	9,785	32.0
Populist	B. K. Collier	5,627	18.4
Prohibition	Joseph Rowell	388	1.3
Total votes		30,548	100.0
Turnout			
Democratic hold			

1896 United States House of Representatives elections
Party	Candidate	Votes	%
Democratic	James G. Maguire (Incumbent)	19,074	61.0
Republican	Thomas B. O'Brien	10,940	35.0
Socialist Labor	E. T. Kingsley	968	3.0
Prohibition	Joseph Rowell	299	1.0
Total votes		31,281	100.0
Turnout			
Democratic hold			

1898 California gubernatorial election
Party	Candidate	Votes	%	±%
Republican	Henry Gage	148,354	51.68%	+12.76%
Democratic	James G. Maguire	129,261	45.03%	+5.69%
Socialist Labor	Job Harriman	5,143	1.79	+1.79%
Prohibition	Joseph E. McComas	4,297	1.50	−2.21%
	Scattering	9	0.00%	
Majority		19,093	6.65%	
Total votes		287,064	100.00%	
Republican gain from Democratic		Swing	+7.07%	

1908 United States House of Representatives elections
Party	Candidate	Votes	%
Republican	Julius Kahn (incumbent)	9,202	52.7
Democratic	James G. Maguire	7,497	42.9
Socialist	K. J. Doyle	699	4.0
Prohibition	William N. Meserve	60	0.3
Total votes		17,458	100.0
Turnout			
Republican hold			

1911 San Francisco District Attorney primary election
Party	Candidate	Votes	%
Nonpartisan	Charles Fickert (incumbent)	29,502	38.3
Nonpartisan	Ralph L. Hathorn	28,226	36.6
Nonpartisan	Emil Liess	4,817	6.2
Nonpartisan	Daniel O'Connell	3,839	5.0
Nonpartisan	Nathan G. Coghlan	2,907	3.8
Nonpartisan	James G. Maguire	2,896	3.8
Nonpartisan	Henry M. Owens	2,308	3.0
Nonpartisan	John A. McGee	1,497	1.9
Nonpartisan	O. C. Wilson	742	1.0
Nonpartisan	Emil J. Kern	339	0.4
Total votes		77,073	100.0
Turnout			

== Works ==
=== Books ===
- Ireland and The Pope; A Brief History of Papal Intrigues Against Irish Liberty from Adrian IV to Leo XIII. San Francisco: James H. Barry. 1888.
- Single-tax vs. Socialism: Debate between James G. Maguire and Job Harriman, June 16, 1895. With Job Harriman. San Francisco: American Section, Socialist Labor Party. 1895.

=== Articles ===
- "On With the Fight!" Chicago: The Public, 1898.
- "Judge Maguire on the Campaign in California." Chicago: The Public, 1898.
- "The Tax That Can’t Be Shifted." St. Louis: The Mirror, 1906.
- "Not Opposed to Property in Land." St. Louis: The Mirror, 1906.
- "Does Not Invade Vested Rights." St. Louis: The Mirror, 1906.
- "The Gompers-Case Usurpation." Chicago: The Public, 1909.
- "Judge Maguire's Memories of Henry George." Chicago: The Public, 1909.
- "Accepted After Trial by Fire." Chicago: The Public, 1911.
- "Judge James G. Maguire writes." London: Land Values, 1915.
- "California Tax Commission: Questions and Answers." London: Land Values, 1917.
- "The Philosophy of The Single Tax Movement." New York: Single Tax Review, 1920.

=== Speeches ===
- Direct Taxation of Land Values. Industrial Depressions. How to Make Labor Free. Speeches of Hon. James G. Maguire of California in the House of Representatives of the United States, January 11, 1894; October 13 and 14, 1893; August 23, 1893; August 26, 1893.
- Chinese Exclusion. Speech of Hon. James G. Maguire of California in the House of Representatives, Friday and Saturday, October 13 and 14, 1893.
- Silver. Speech of Hon. James G. Maguire of California in the House of Representatives, Friday, August 25, 1893.
- Silver. Speech of Hon. James G. Maguire of California in the House of Representatives, Saturday, August 26, 1893.
- The Democratic Solution of the Railroad Problem. Speech of Hon. James G. Maguire of California in the House of Representatives, February 4, 1898.
- The Function of Government In Public Utilities. Speech of Hon. James G. Maguire of California in the House of Representatives, February 4, 1898.
- How the Single Tax Would Affect the Farmers. An extract from Judge James G. Maguire's opening campaign address, made in San Francisco, as reported in the Call of September 14, 1898.
- No Freedom of Contract. Labor Day Address in San Francisco, September 2, 1901.
- San Francisco's Greatest Obstacle to Rehabilitation. Judge James G. Maguire in a Recent Speech Before the Friendly Club, San Francisco, as Reported in the San Francisco Star of August 13, 1906.

Party political offices
Preceded by James Budd	Democratic nominee for Governor of California; 1898	Succeeded by Franklin Knight Lane
Political offices
Preceded by Three members	California State Assemblyman, 13th District; 1875-1877 (with three others)	Succeeded by Four members
U.S. House of Representatives
Preceded by John T. Cutting	Member of the U.S. House of Representatives from California's 4th congressional district 1893-1899	Succeeded by Julius Kahn
