= A. B. Maguire =

American politician (1847–1924)

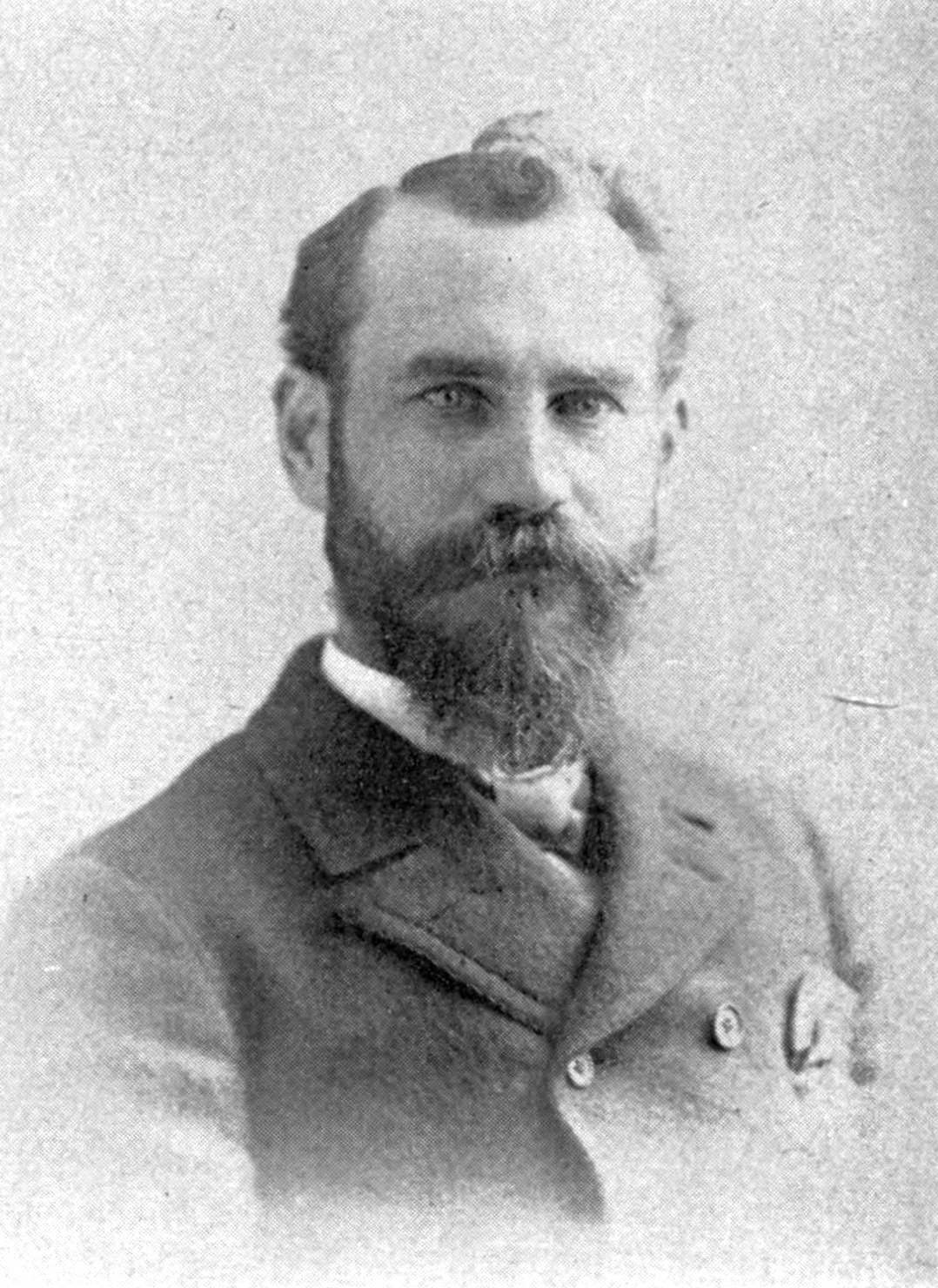
- Maguire c. 1900

Member of the San Francisco Board of Public Works
- In office June 29, 1900 – January 8, 1902
- Appointed by: James D. Phelan
- Preceded by: Jeremiah Mahony
- Succeeded by: Michael Casey

Member of the San Francisco Board of Supervisors
- In office January 8, 1900 – June 29, 1900
- Preceded by: At-large districts established
- Succeeded by: Samuel Braunhart

Undersheriff of San Francisco
- In office January 3, 1893 – January 8, 1895
- Appointed by: John J. McDade
- Preceded by: Peter Deveny
- Succeeded by: William Clack

Member of the California State Assembly from the 11th district
- In office January 5, 1880 – January 3, 1881
- Preceded by: Multi-member district
- Succeeded by: Multi-member district

Personal details
- Born: Augustus Benedict Maguire; 1847 Boston, Massachusetts, U.S.
- Died: January 7, 1924 (aged 76–77) San Francisco, California, U.S.
- Resting place: Holy Cross Cemetery
- Party: Workingmen's (before 1881); Democratic (after 1881)
- Spouse: Agnes E. Pendegast (m. 1873; died 1921)
- Children: 5
- Occupation: Miner; mason; merchant; politician
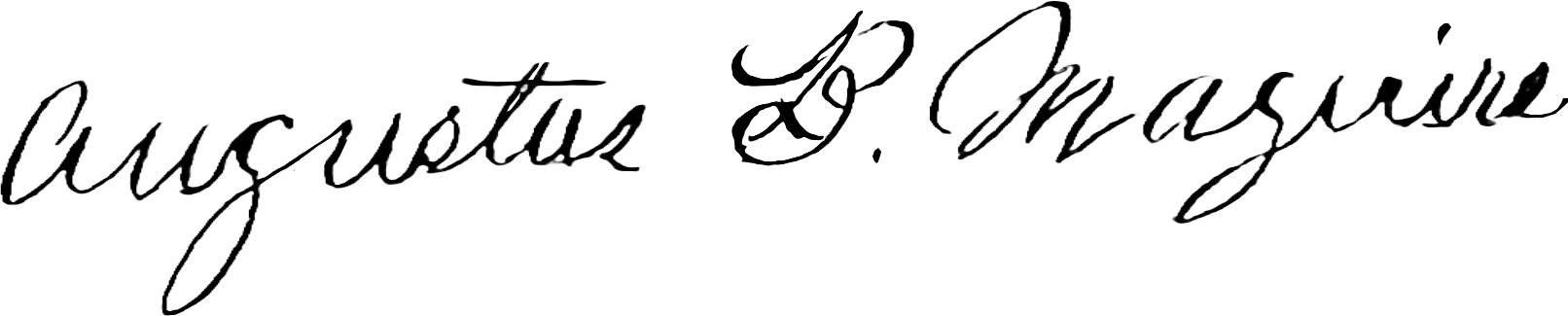
- Signature

Augustus Benedict Maguire (1847 – January 7, 1924) was an American politician and merchant who served in the California State Assembly from 1880 to 1881, as undersheriff of San Francisco from 1893 to 1895, on the San Francisco Board of Supervisors from January to June 1900, and on the San Francisco Board of Public Works from 1900 to 1902.

== Early life ==
Augustus Benedict Maguire was born in Boston, Massachusetts in 1847. He attended public schools and graduated from Boston High School. He sailed for Australia in 1864 and worked in the mines there for two years.

== Career ==
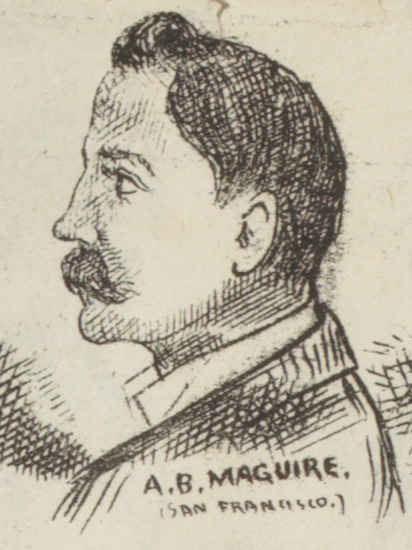
1880 sketch by Carl Browne

In October 1867, Maguire came to California on the John Jay. Settling in San Francisco, he worked as a mason's and plasterer's apprentice before moving into the dry goods business for three years, founding a dry goods house in the Mission District, and the blasting contracting business for fourteen years. He was also engaged in insurance for eight years and was connected with the Firemen's Fund Insurance Company and the Builders' Exchange.

In 1879, Maguire was elected as a member of the Workingmen's Party to the California State Assembly, 11th district (then the 13th district). He was a member of the public buildings and grounds, and state prison committees. In 1884, he was a candidate for school director of San Francisco. In 1887, he formed a co-partnership with Lawrence G. Flanagan, named Flanagan & Maguire, for the sale of hay and grain. Their firm was located at 18th and Folsom streets in San Francisco.

Maguire was a candidate for tax collector in 1890. In January 1893, he was appointed undersheriff of San Francisco by John J. McDade, serving until the end of McDade's term in 1895. He was elected to the San Francisco Board of Supervisors in 1899, serving until his resignation on June 29, 1900.

On June 28, 1900, Maguire was appointed by San Francisco mayor James D. Phelan to succeed Jeremiah Mahony as a commissioner on the San Francisco Board of Public Works.

Maguire was active in urban renewal efforts and was considered the "father" of the Mission District's viaduct. He was a founding member of the Young Men's Institute, director of the Mission Home and Loan Association, and worked with the Pacific Gas and Electric Company for twenty years.

== Personal life ==
Maguire married Agnes E. Pendegast on November 27, 1873. They had five children, including Mrs. H. A. Steinberg and A. B. Jr. He lived on 20th and Folsom Streets in Mission District in San Francisco and vacationed for decades in La Honda, establishing the Flornell Camp there.

Maguire died on January 7, 1924, in San Francisco. He was interred in Holy Cross Cemetery in Colma.
