= Samuel Braunhart =

American politician (1848–1906)

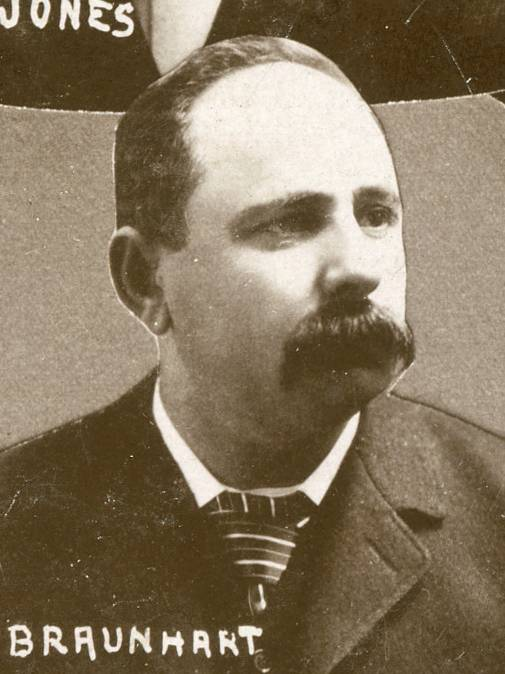
- Braunhart c. 1899

Member of the San Francisco Board of Supervisors
- In office June 29, 1900 – January 8, 1906
- Appointed by: James D. Phelan
- Preceded by: A. B. Maguire
- Succeeded by: Sam Davis

Member of the California Senate from the 17th district
- In office January 4, 1897 – June 28, 1900
- Preceded by: William J. Dunn
- Succeeded by: Joseph M. Plunkett

Member of the California State Assembly from the 11th district
- In office January 5, 1880 – January 3, 1881
- Preceded by: Multi-member district
- Succeeded by: Multi-member district

Personal details
- Born: January 1, 1848 Schubin, Province of Posen, Kingdom of Prussia
- Died: May 28, 1906 (aged 58) San Francisco, California, U.S.
- Party: Workingmen's (before 1881); Democratic (after 1881)
- Occupation: Cigar salesman
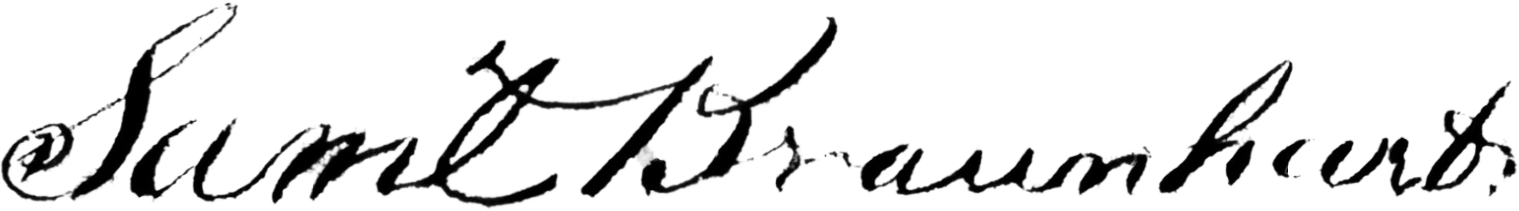
- Signature

Samuel Braunhart (January 1, 1848 – May 28, 1906) was a German American cigar salesman and politician who served in the California State Assembly from 1880 to 1881, the California State Senate from 1897 to 1900, and the San Francisco Board of Supervisors from 1900 to 1906.

== Biography ==
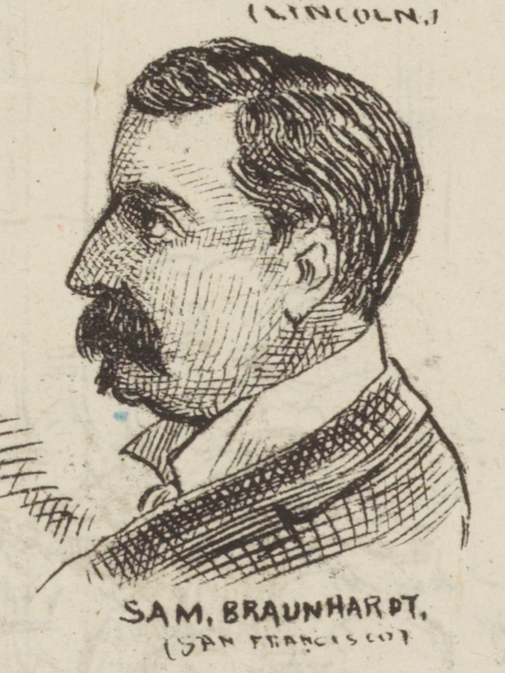
1880 sketch by Carl Browne

Braunhart was born on January 1, 1848, in Szubin, to a Prussian Jewish family. He immigrated to America in 1862 and settled in San Francisco in 1871. Establishing himself as a cigar salesman, he was first elected to the State Assembly in 1879 on the Workingmen's ticket. After serving a single term, he left office and became active in the oil business. In 1895, he was appointed San Francisco Port Warden. He made his return to the State Legislature in 1896, when he was elected to the State Senate as a Democrat. He held that office until 1900, when San Francisco Mayor James D. Phelan appointed him to the San Francisco Board of Supervisors to fill a vacancy caused by the resignation of A. B. Maguire. He won re-election in 1901 and 1903, but was defeated in the Union Labor landslide in 1905. He died the next year, his health made worse from the stress of the 1906 San Francisco earthquake.

During his career in politics, Braunhart became known for his support of working-class causes, such as Chinese exclusion, anti-monopolism, and public ownership. In 1873, while working in Los Angeles, he was challenged to a duel over a personal dispute, withdrawing at the last minute after he discovered his pistol had not been loaded.

== Caricature gallery ==
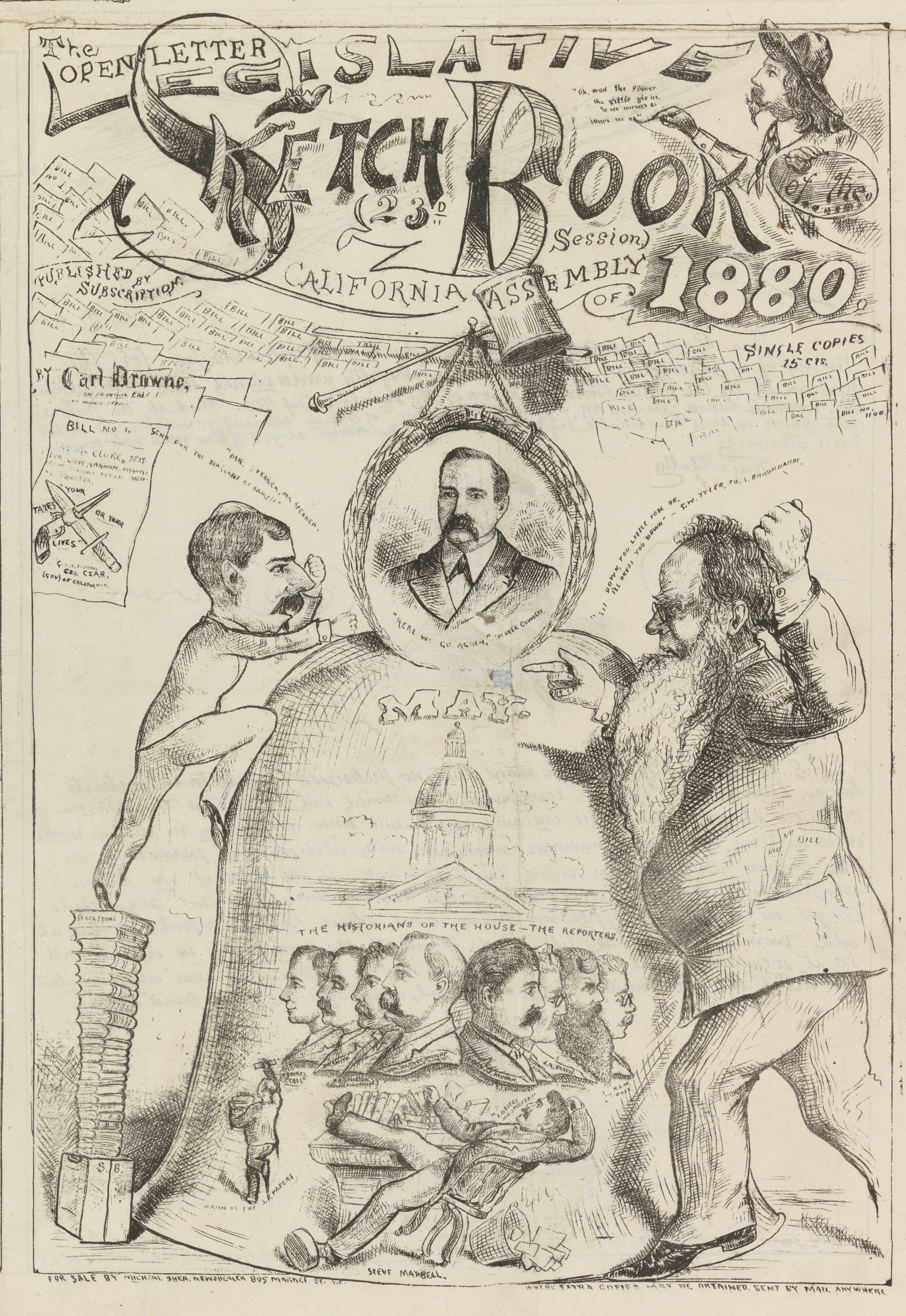
The Open Letter Legislative Sketch Book, 23d Session, California Assembly of 1880

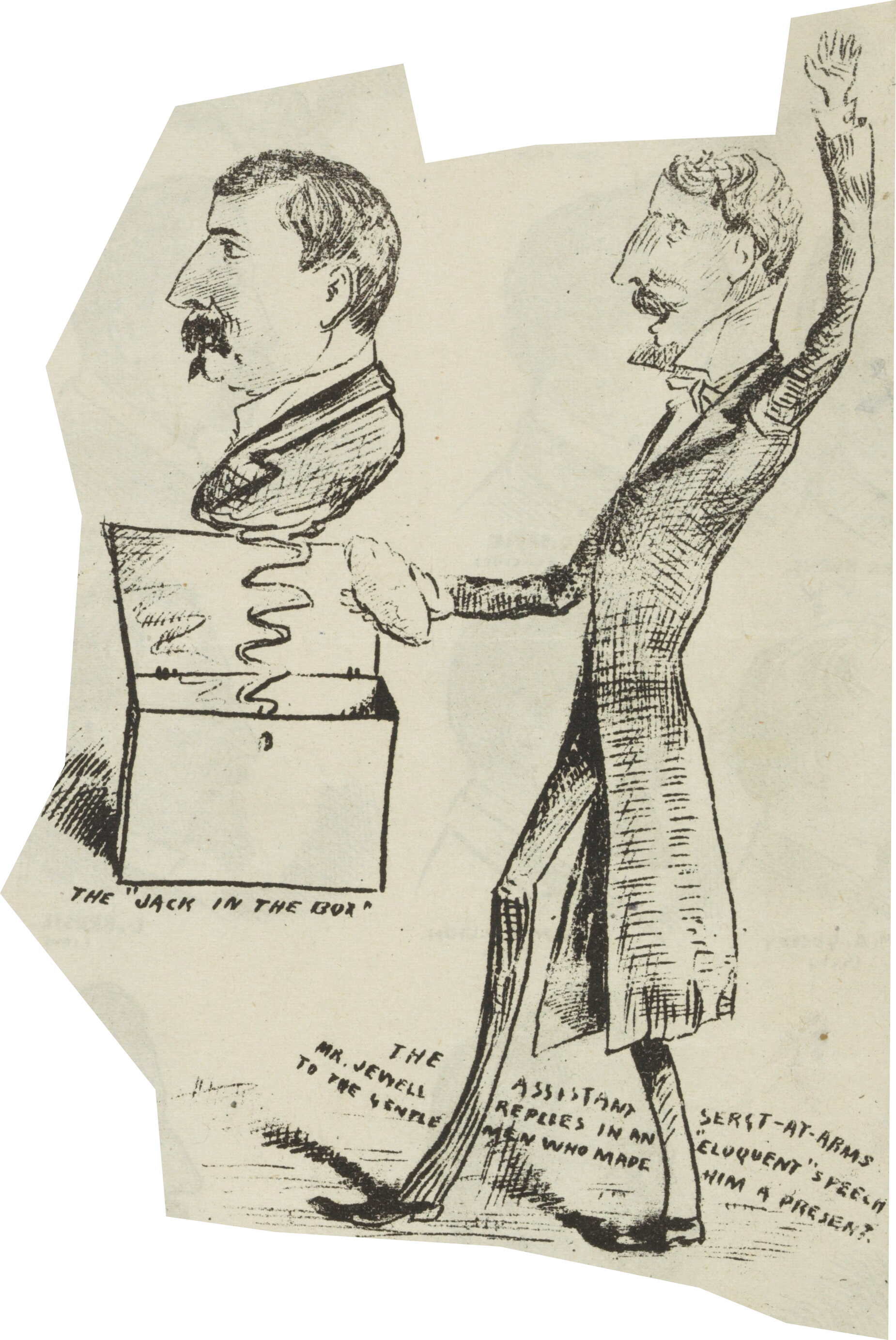
"The Jack in the Box"

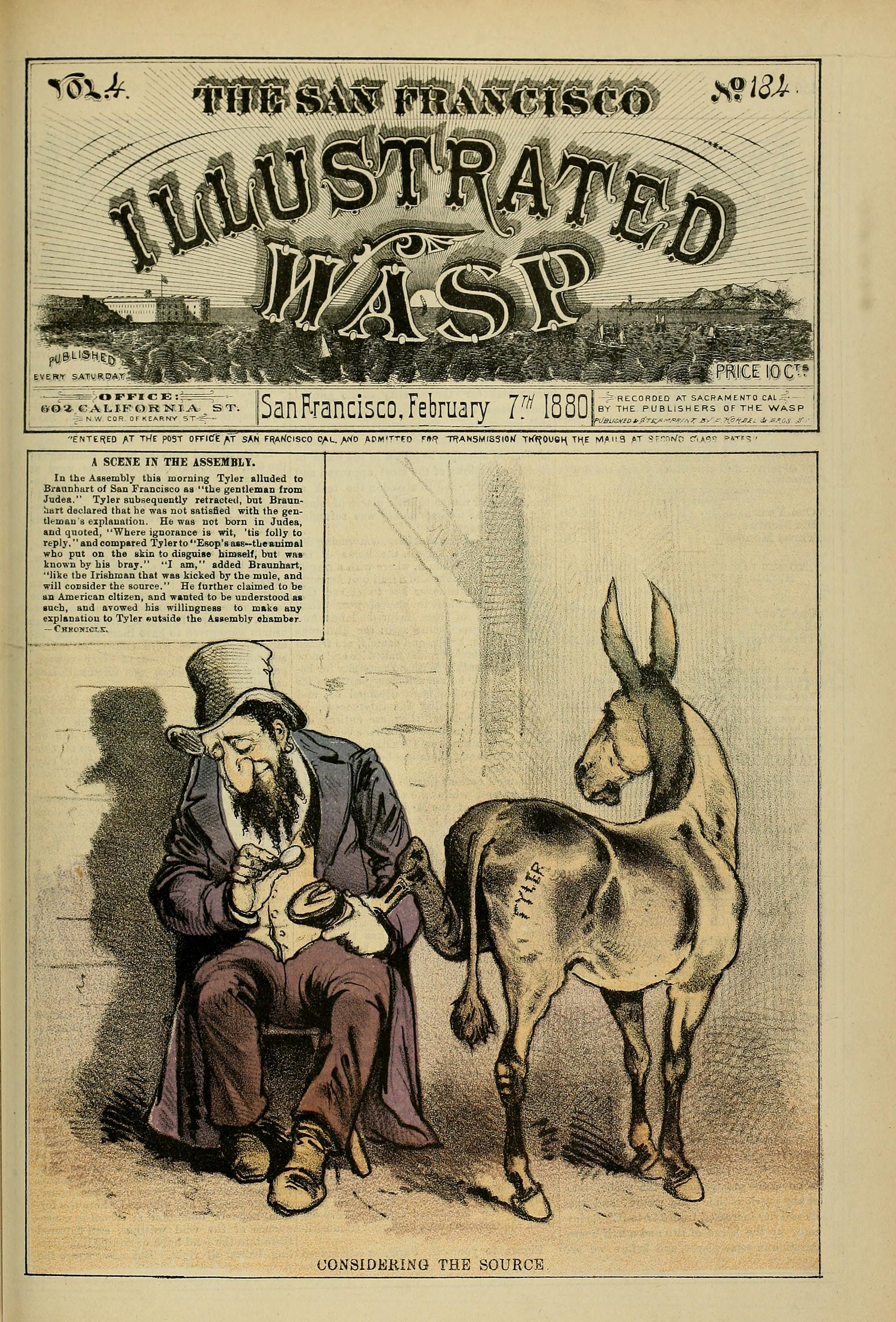
"Considering the Source"

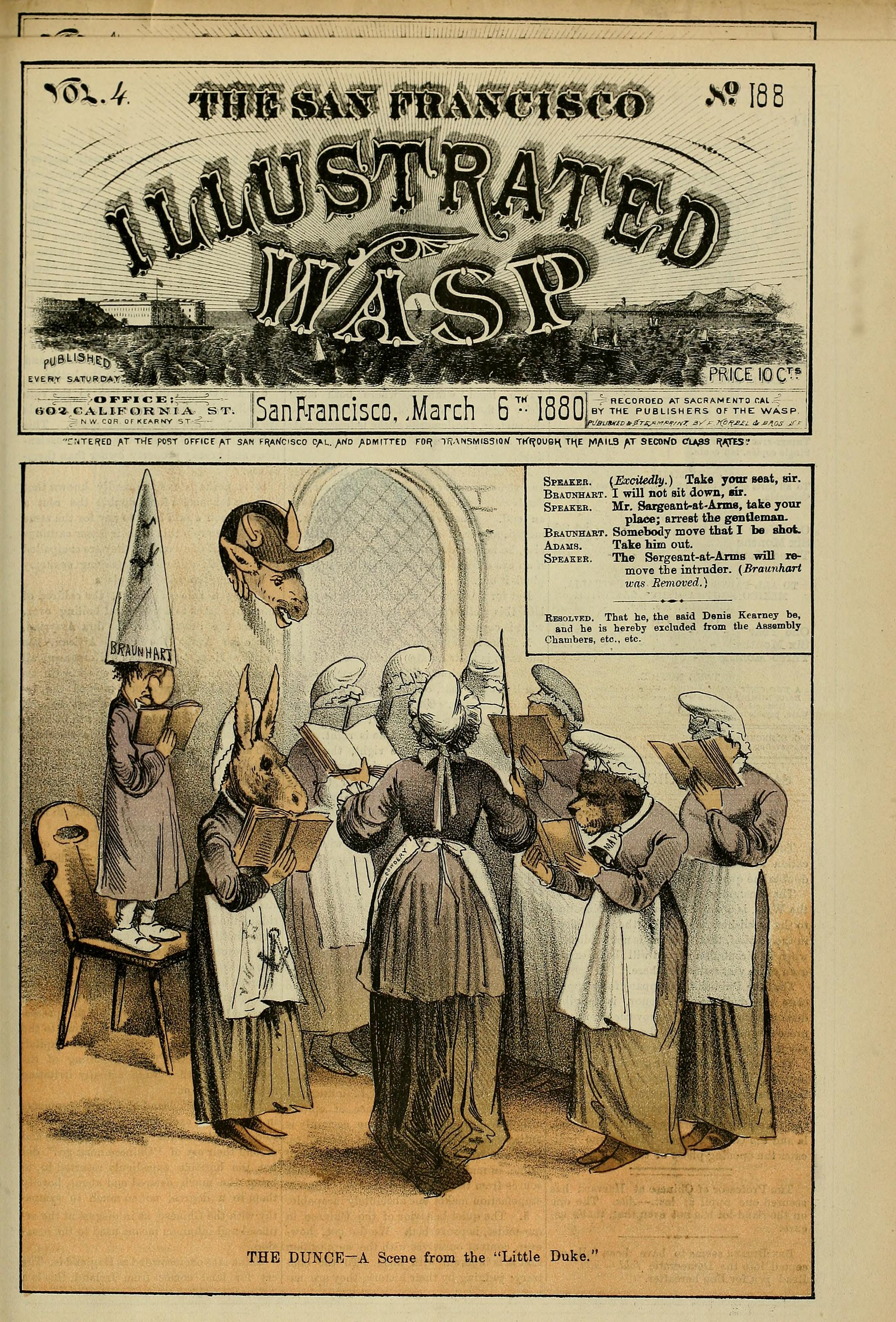
"THE DUNCE—A Scene from the 'Little Duke'"

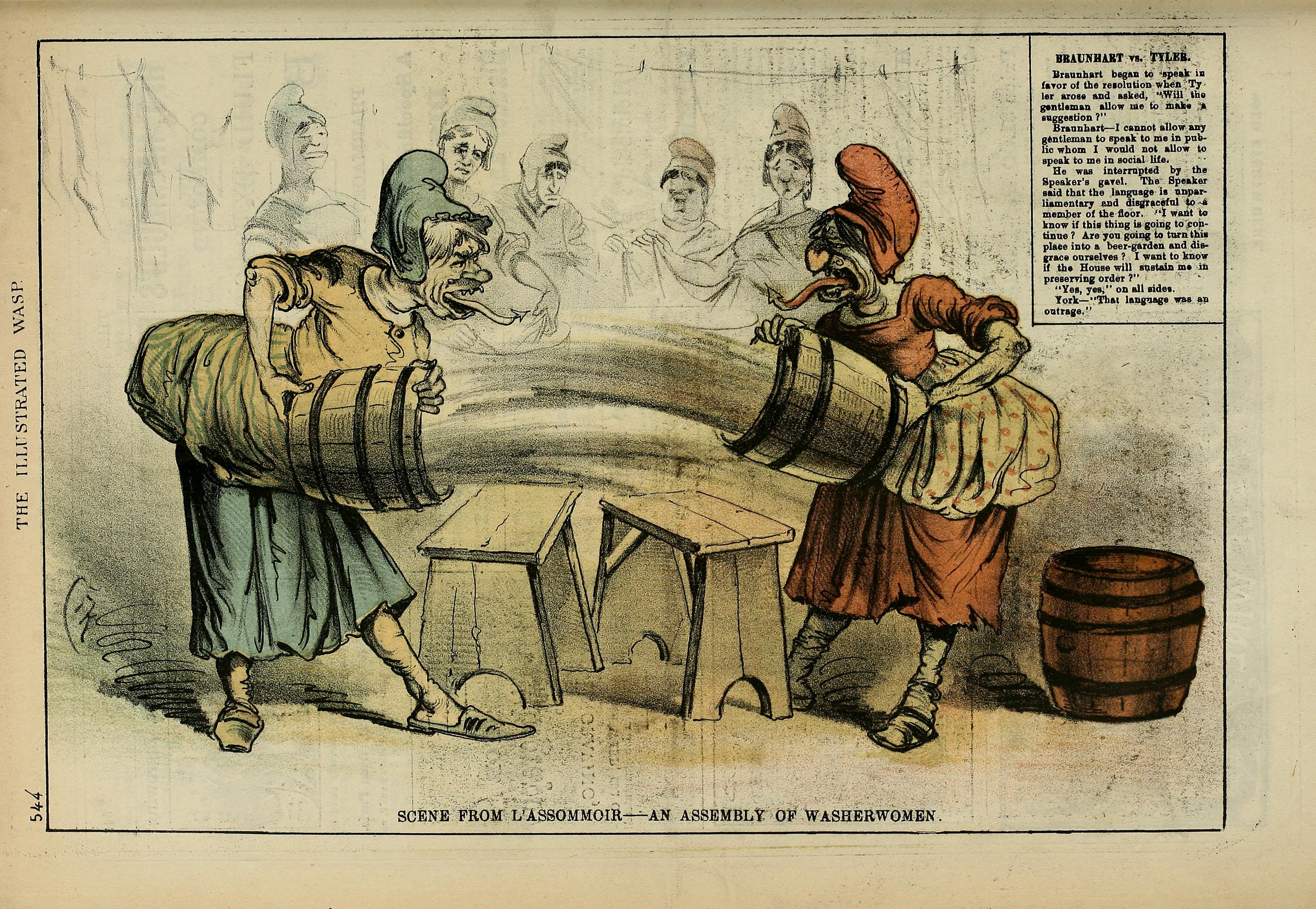
"Scene From L'assommoir—An Assembly of Washerwomen"

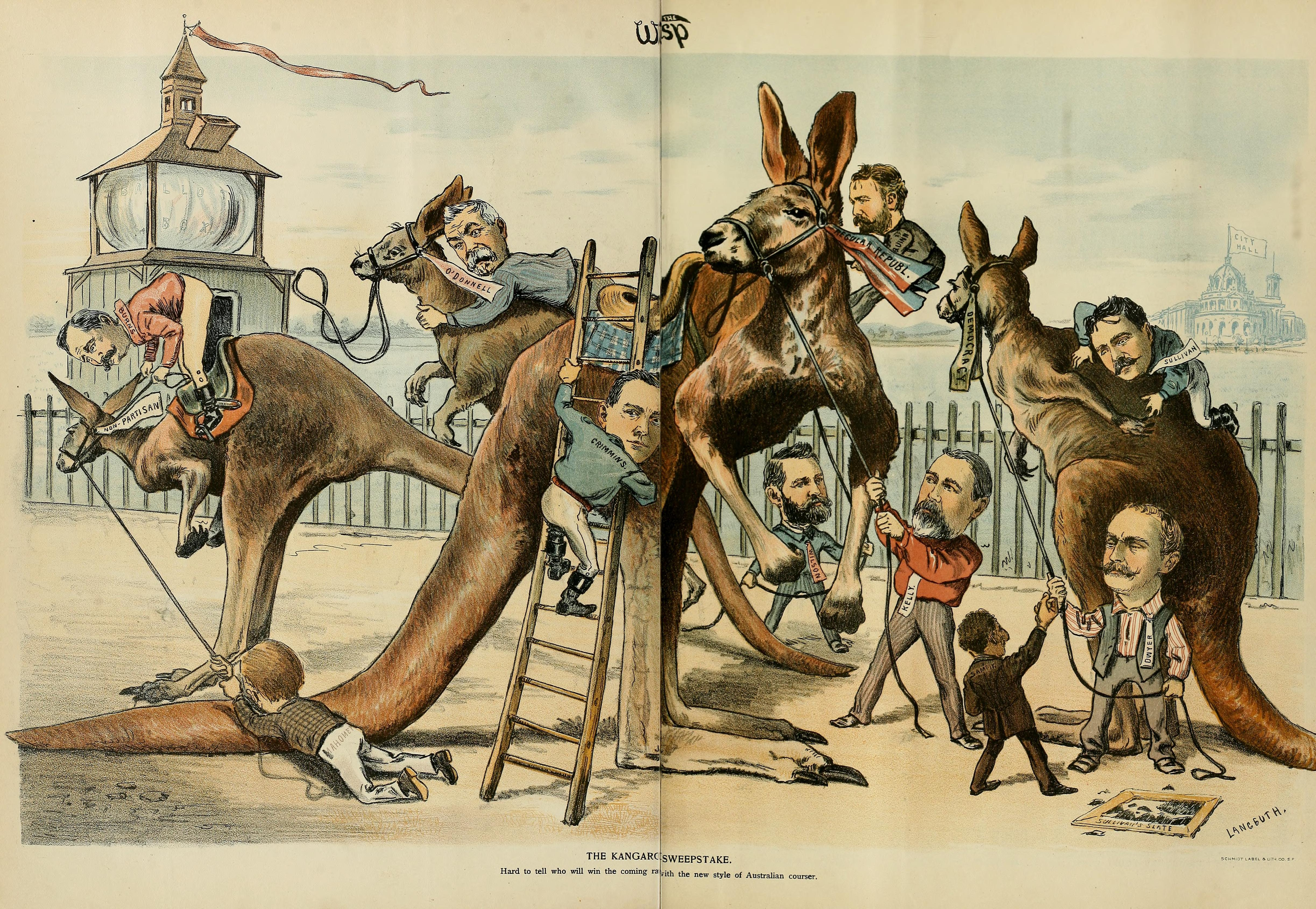
"The Kangaroo Sweepstake"

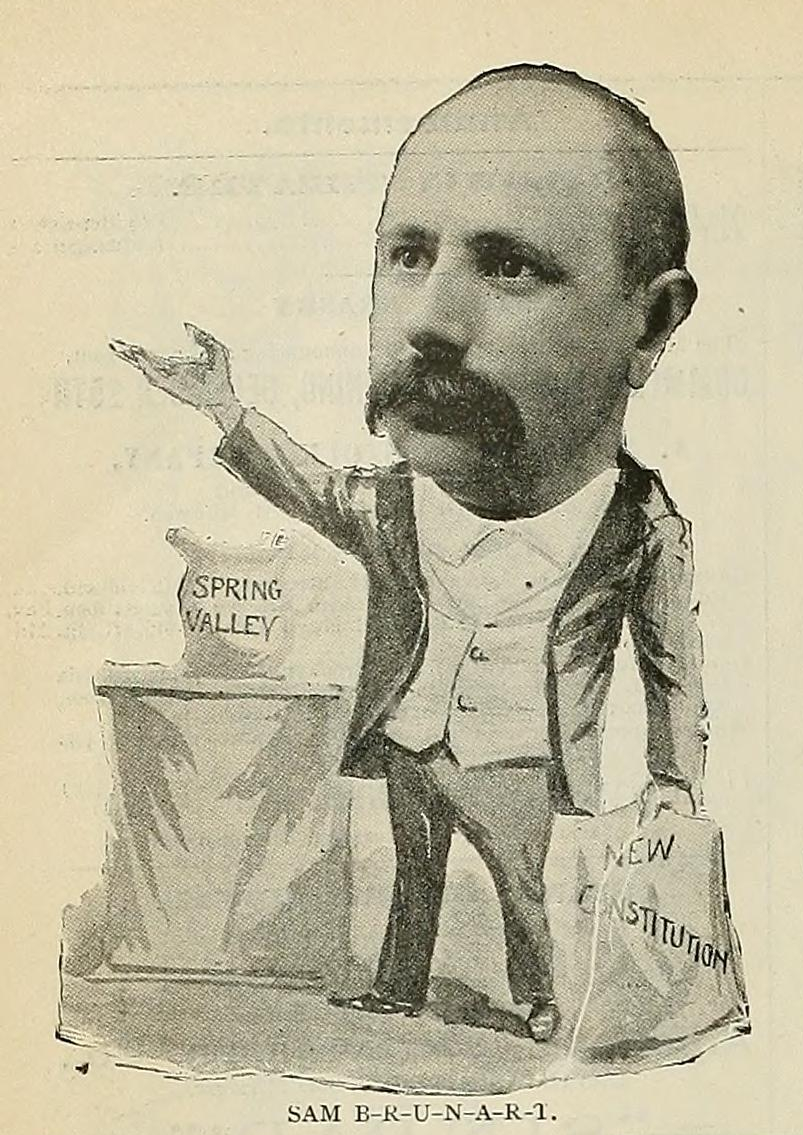
"Sam B-R-U-N-A-R-T"

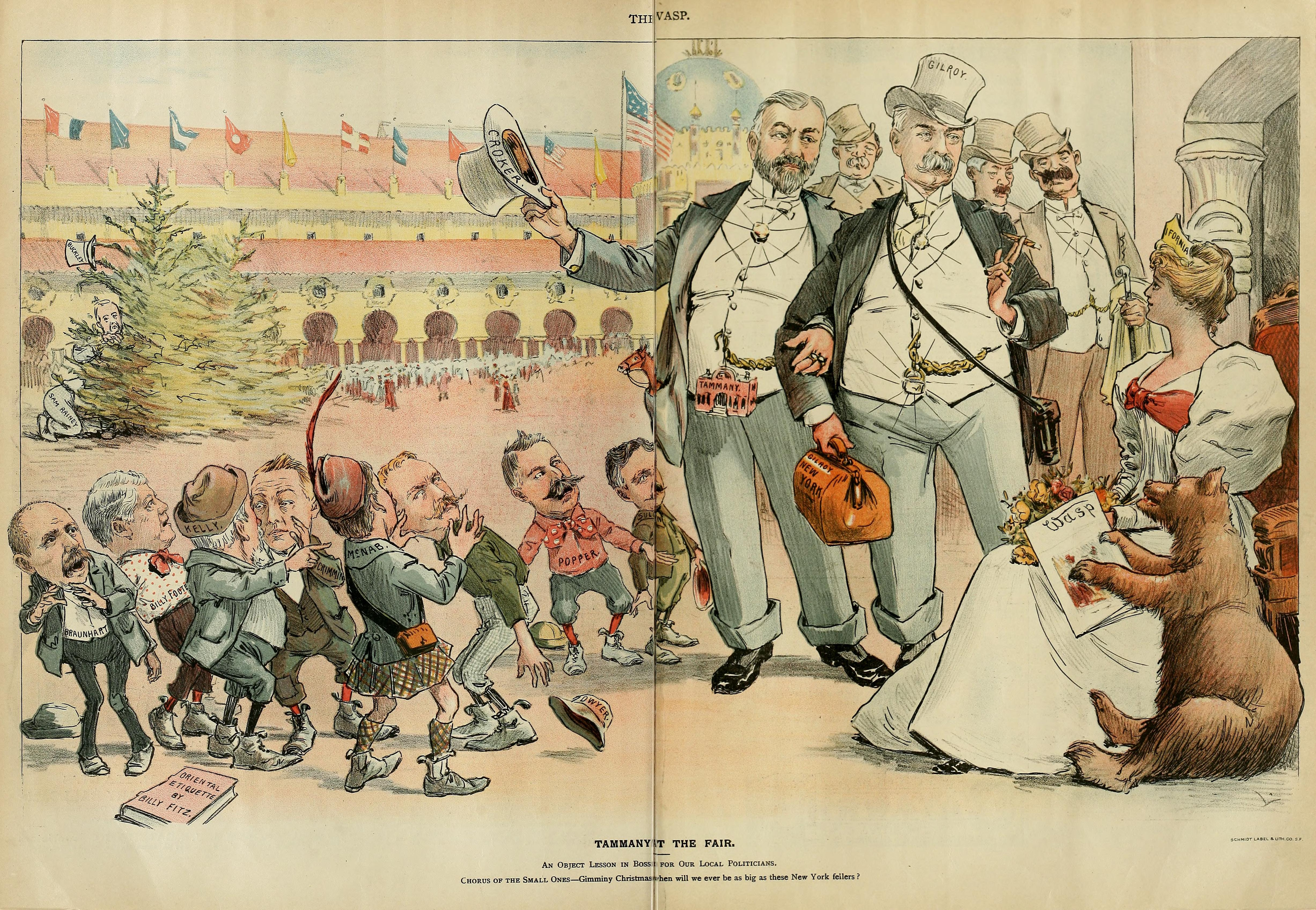
"Tammany at the Fair"

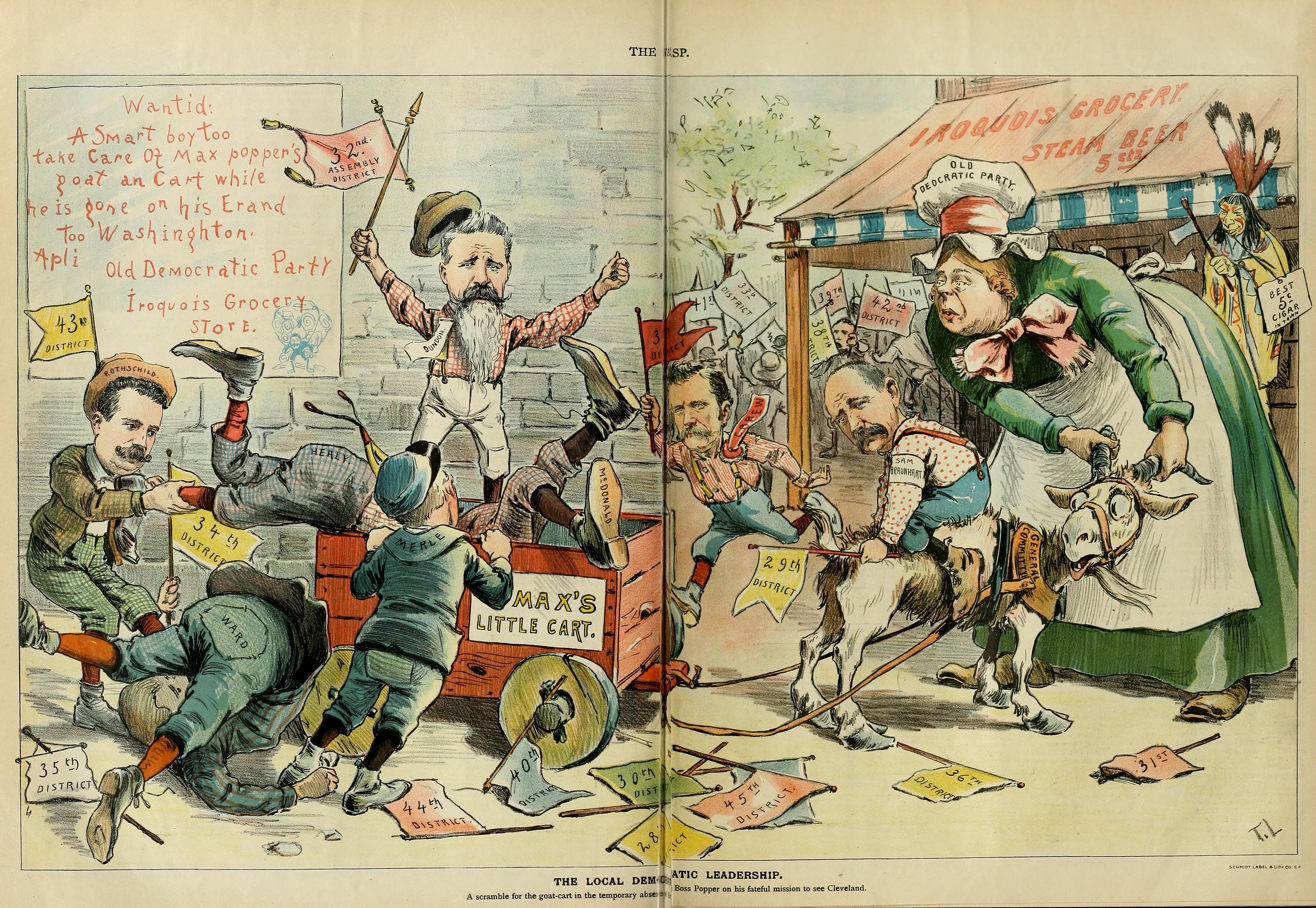
"The Local Democratic Leadership"

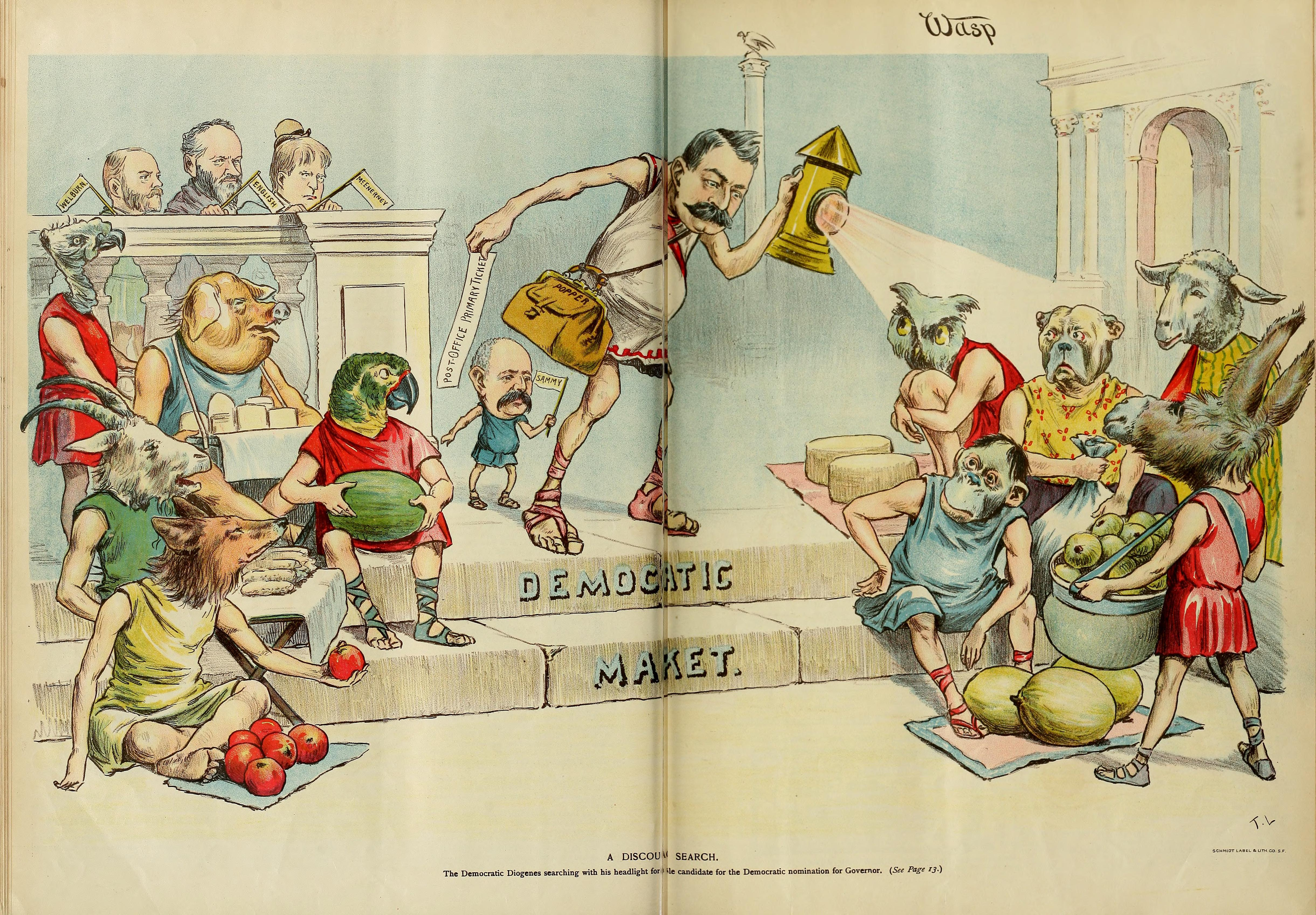
"A Discouraging Search"

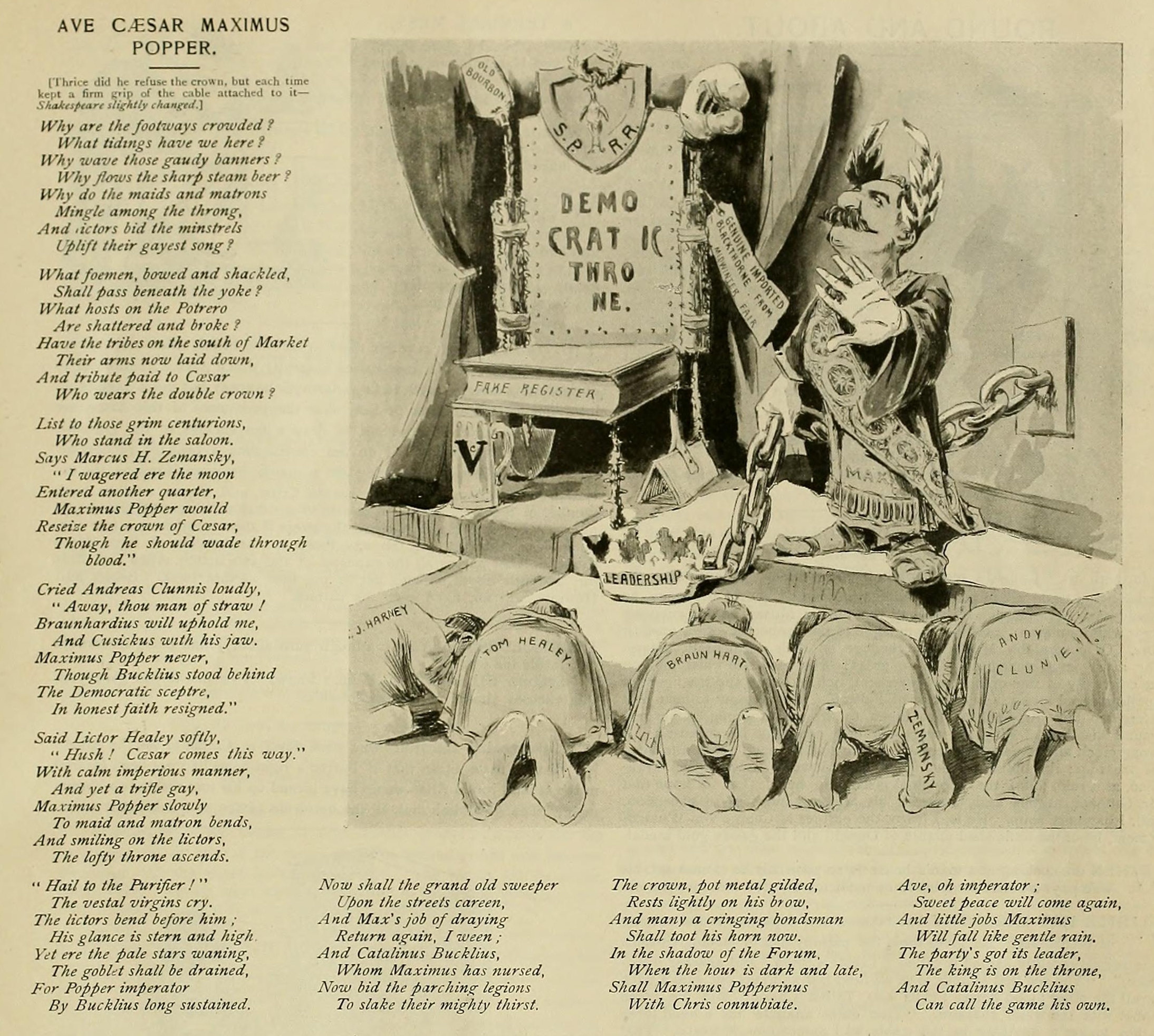
"AVE CÆSAR MAXIMUS POPPER"

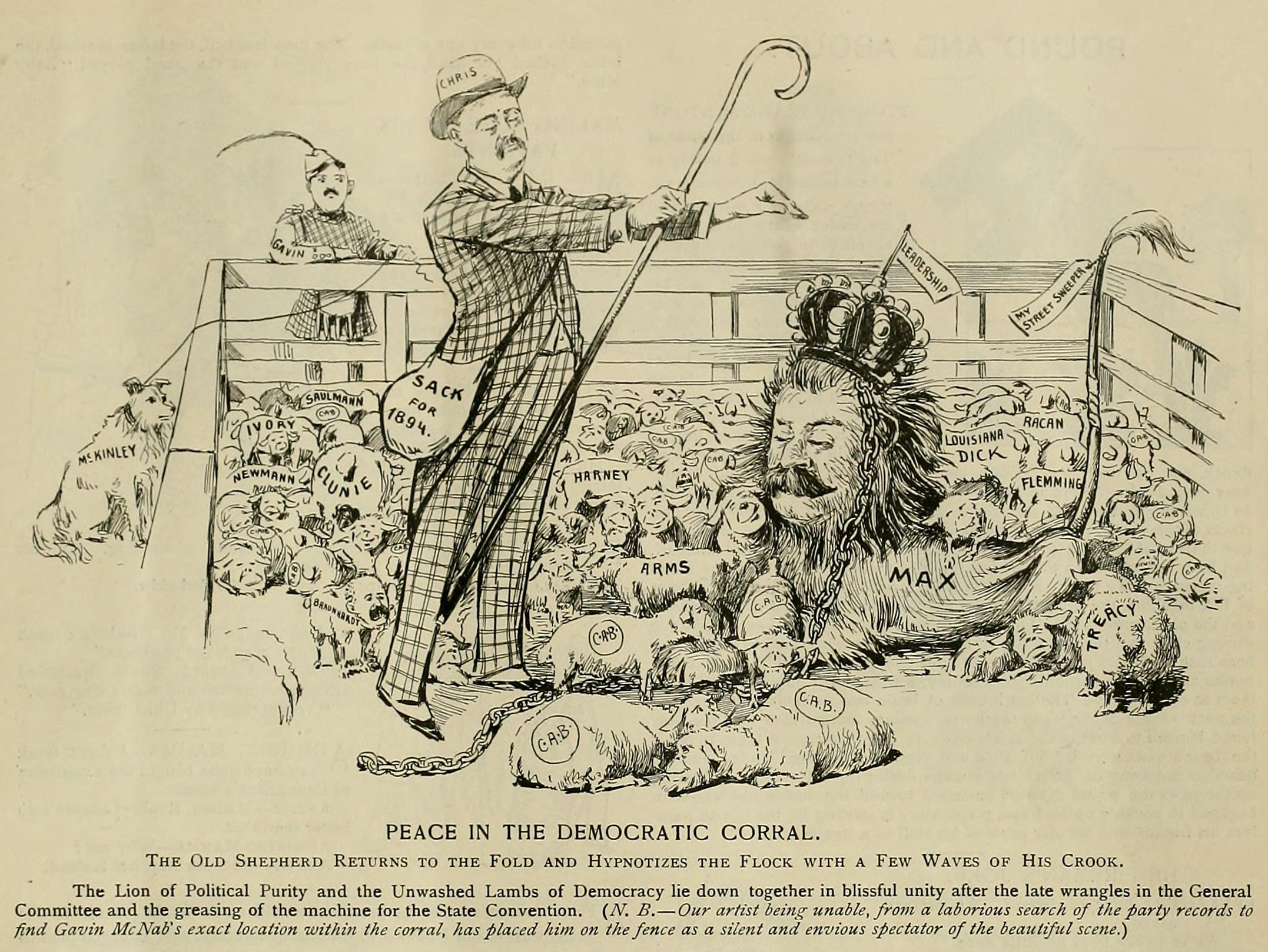
"Peace in the Democratic Corral"

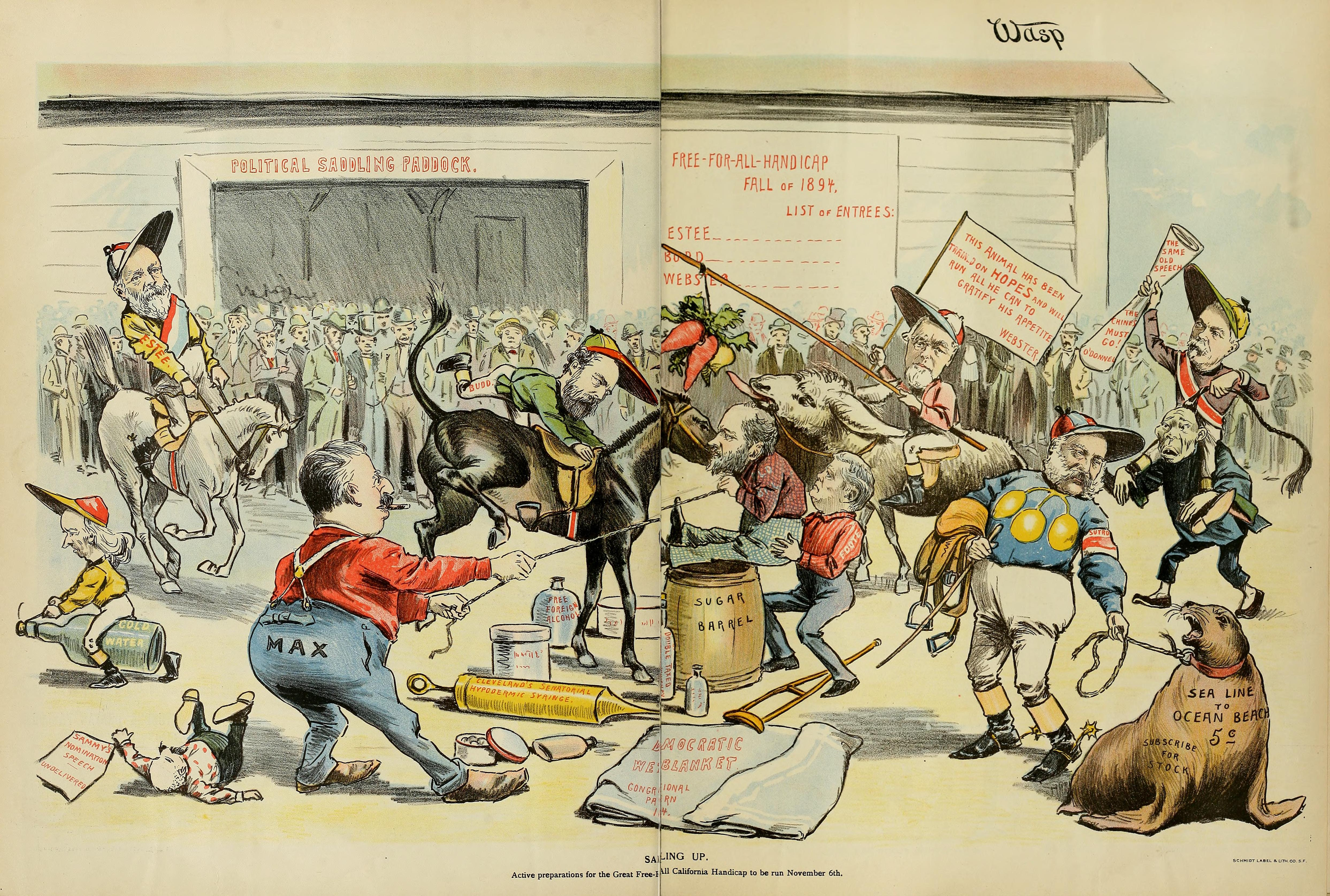
"Saddling Up"

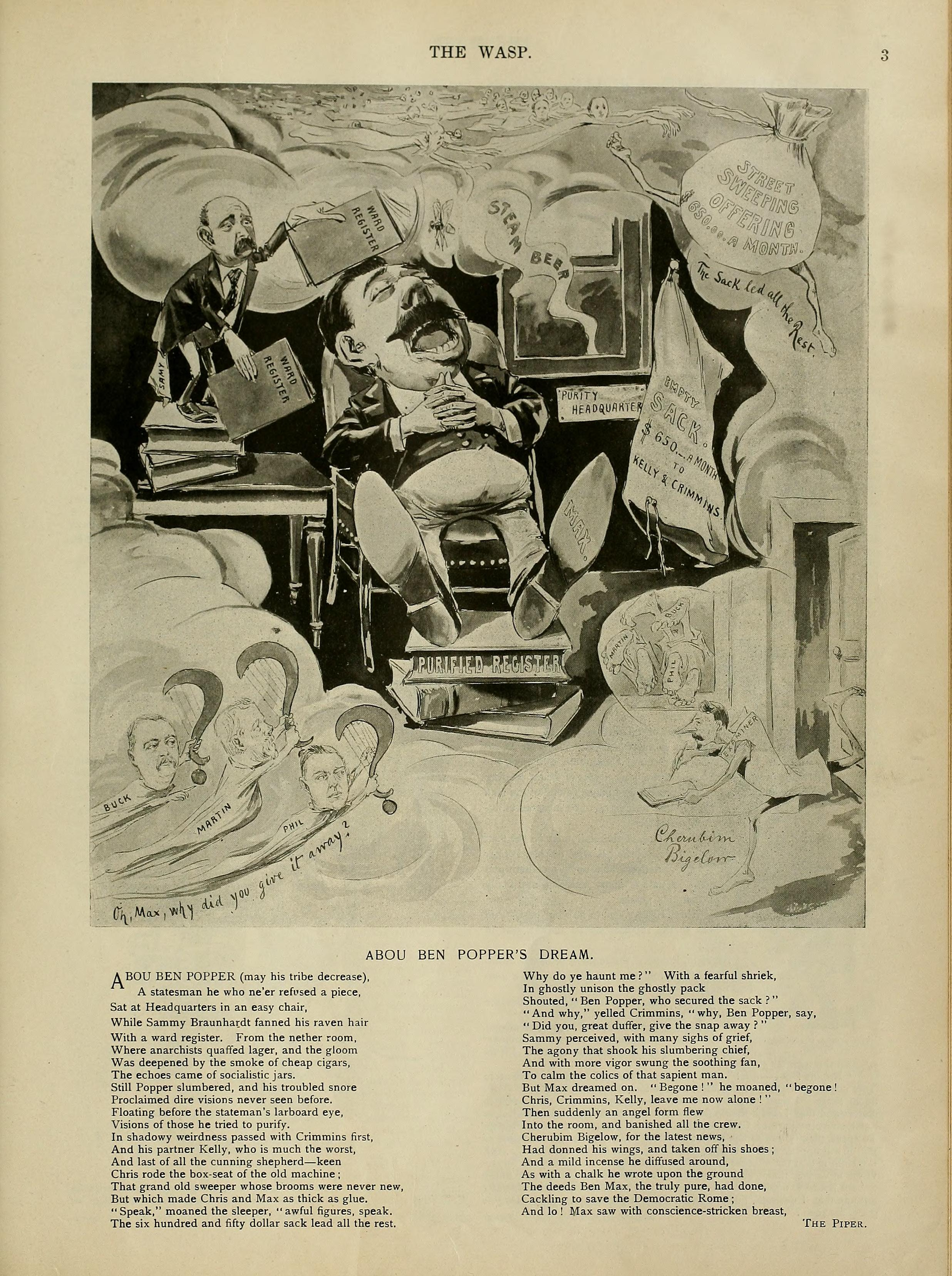
"Abou Ben Popper's Dream"

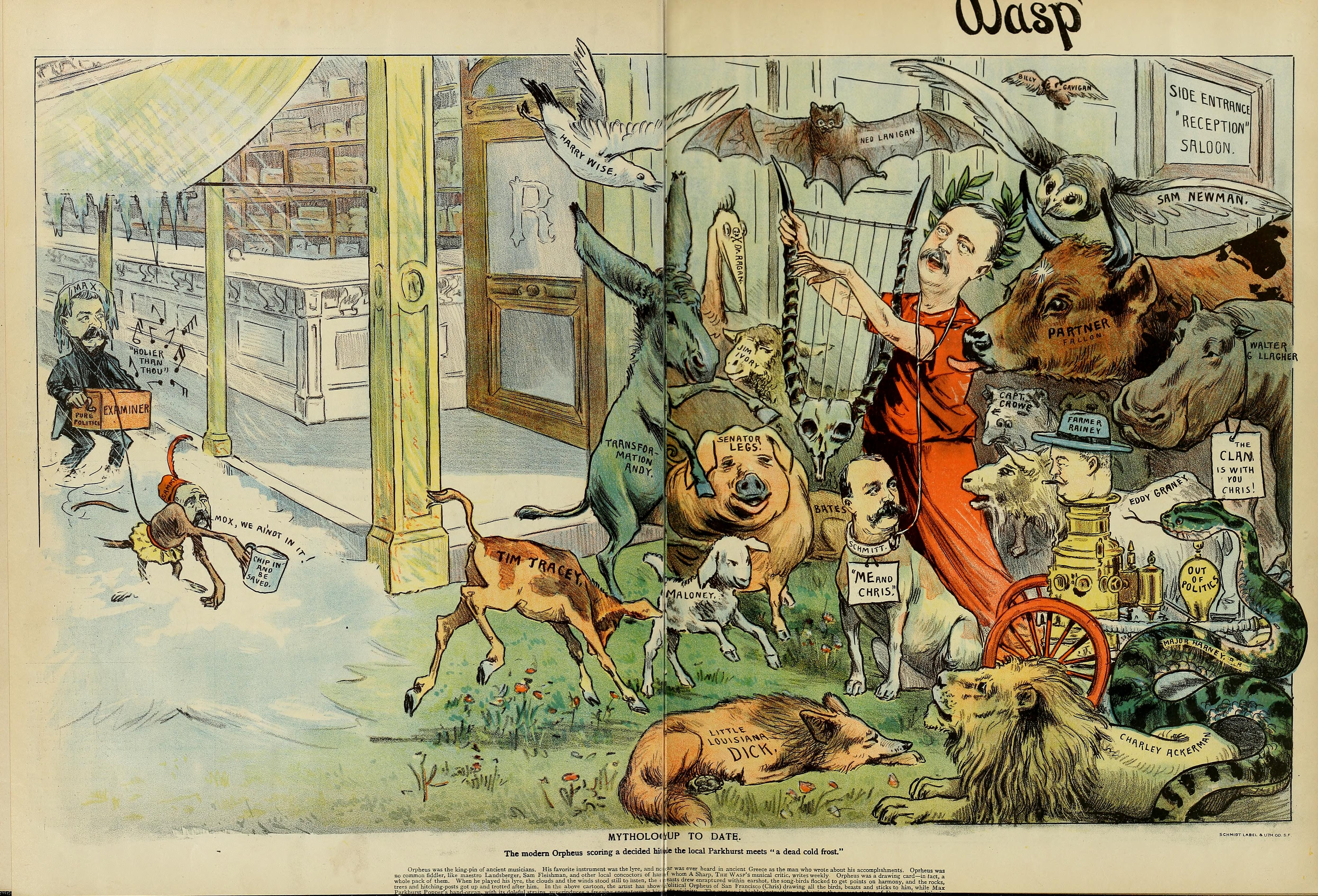
"Mythology Up to Date"

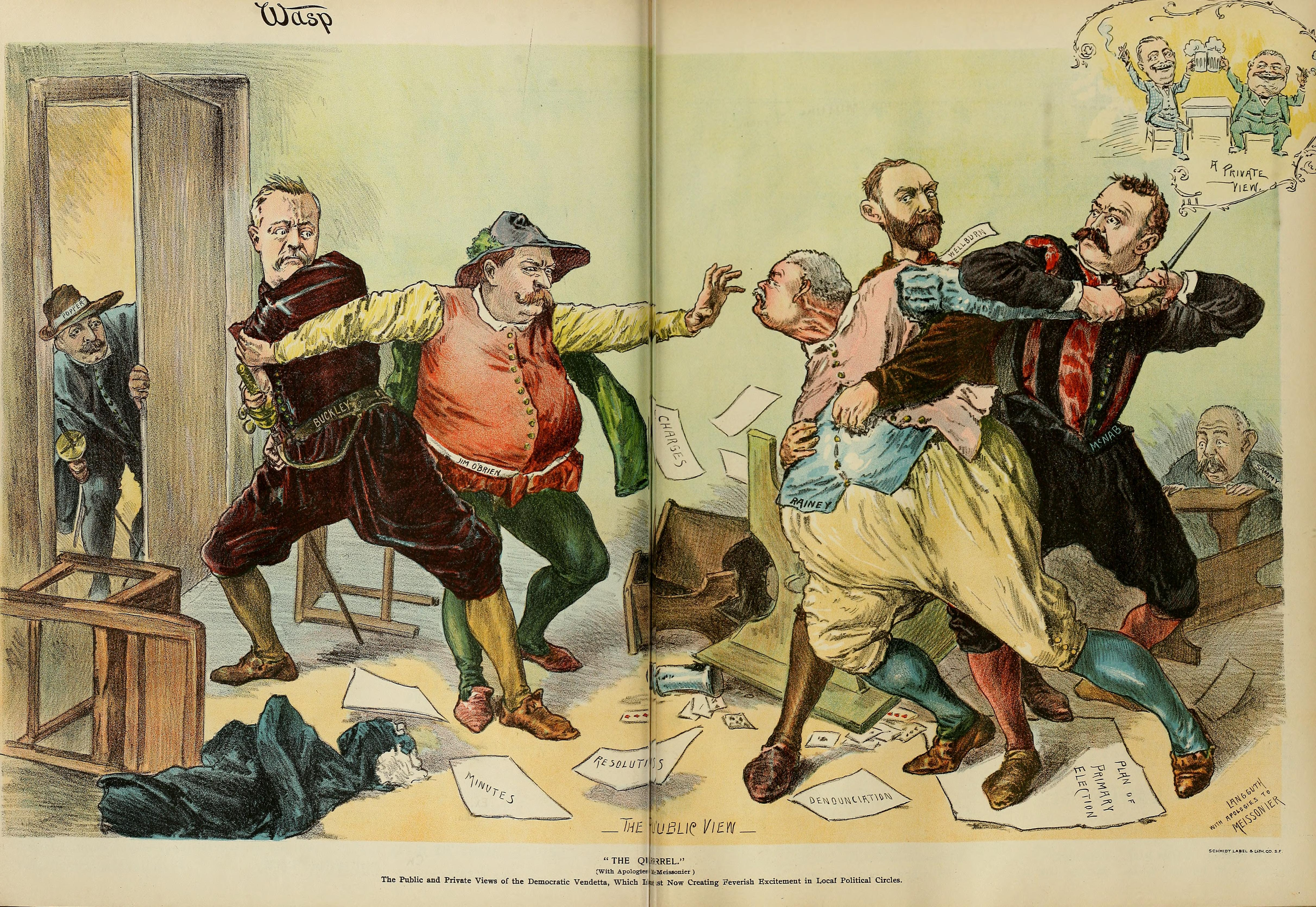
"The Quarrel"

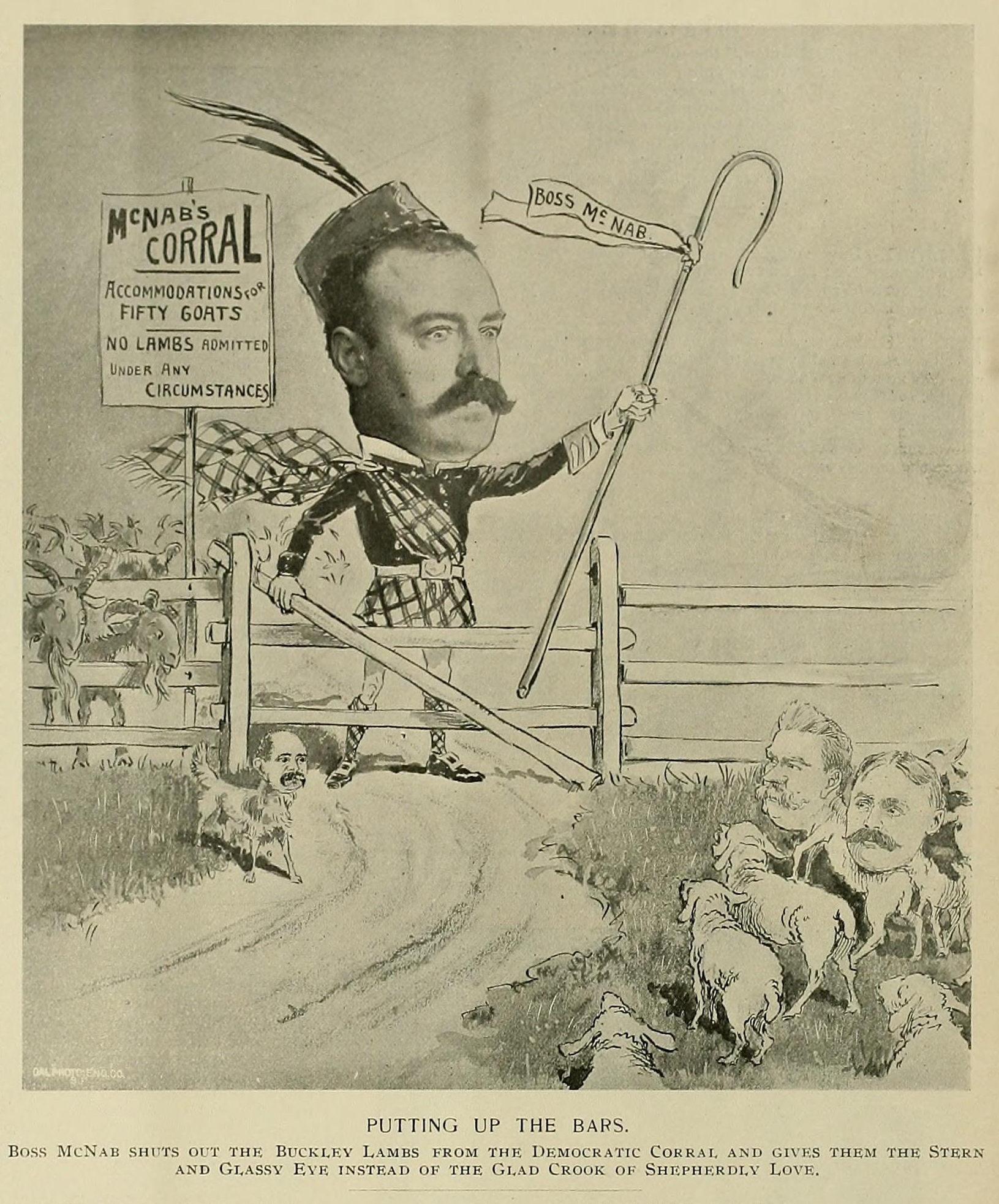
"Putting Up the Bars"

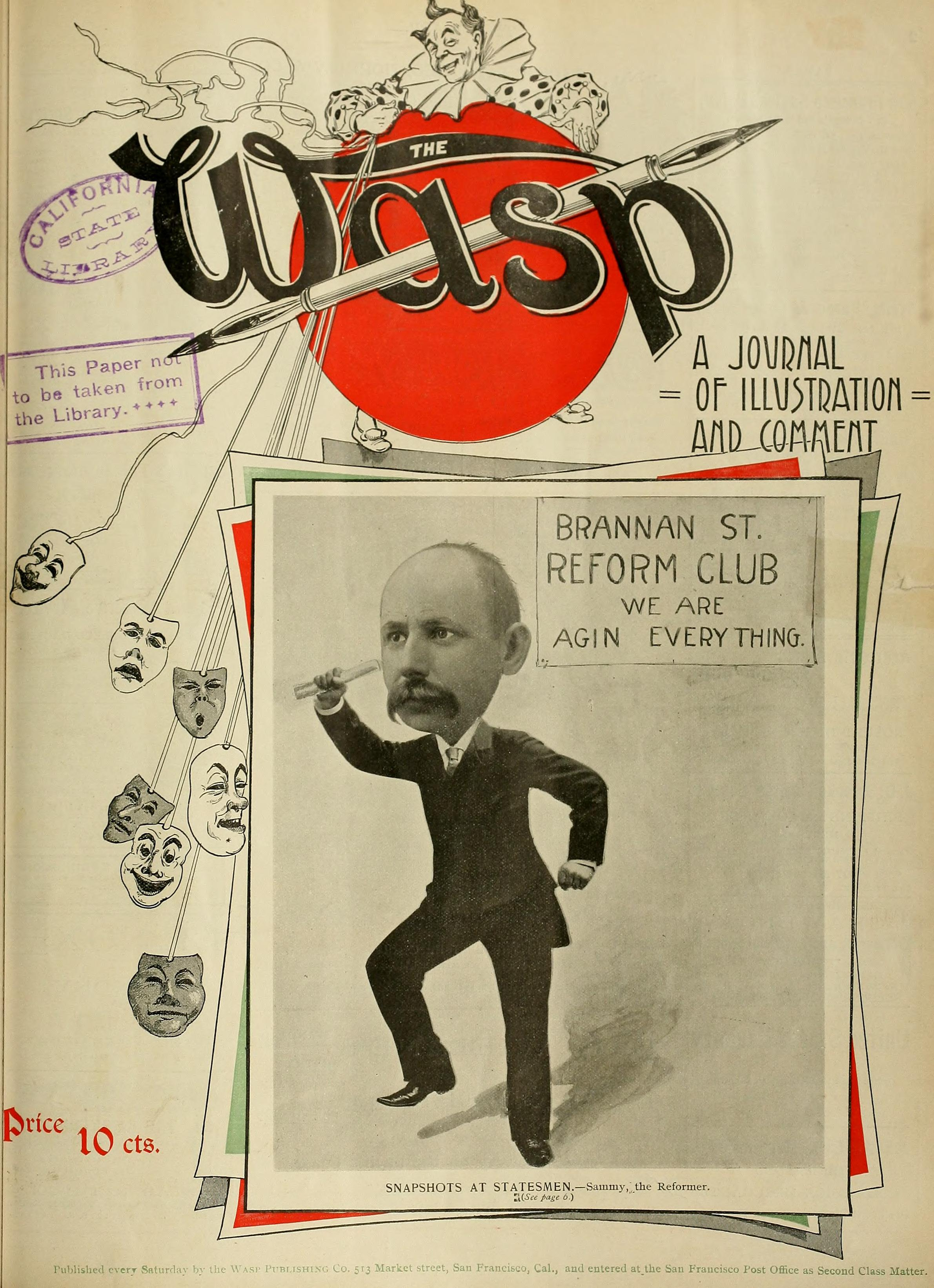
"Snapshots at Statesmen"

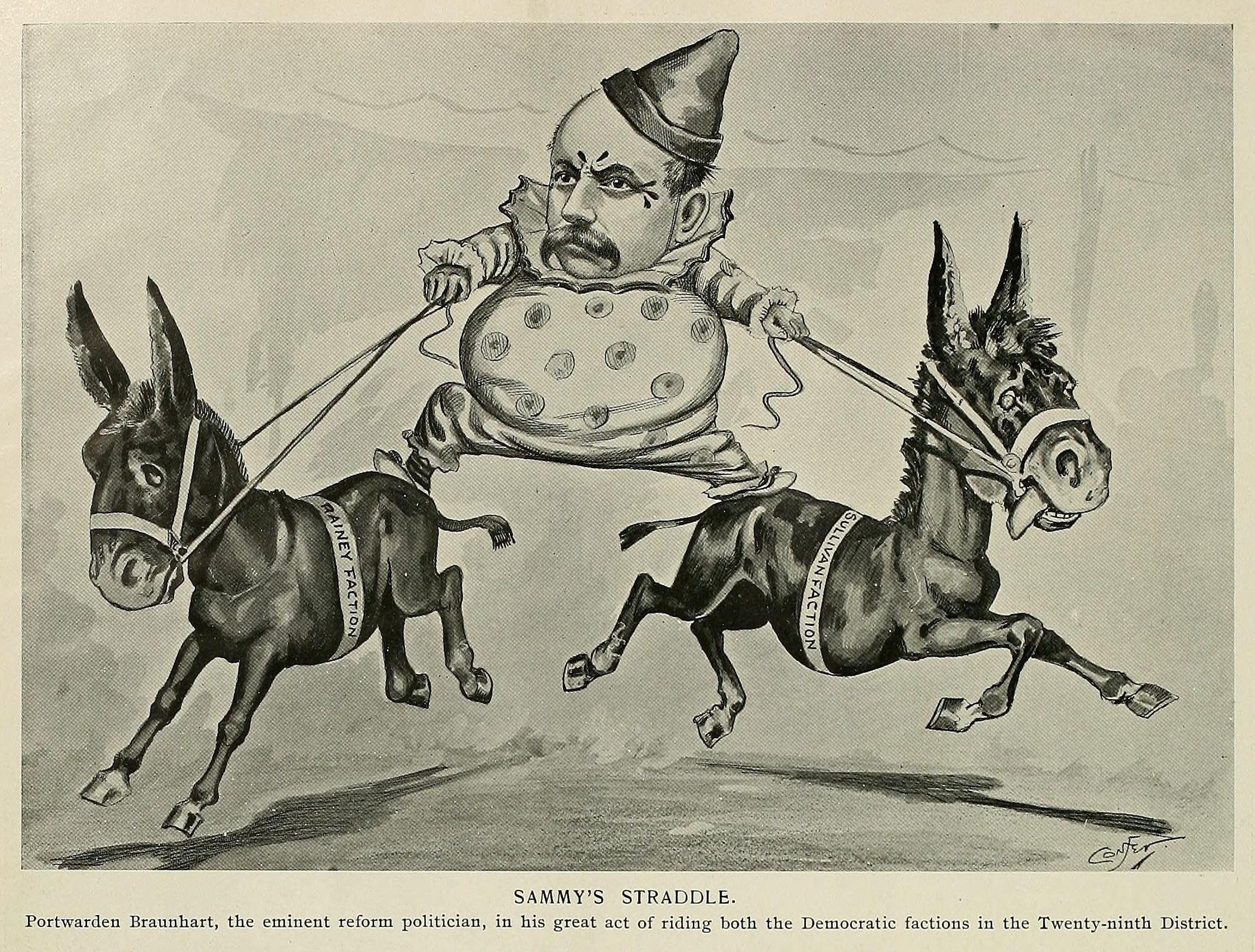
"Sammy's Straddle"

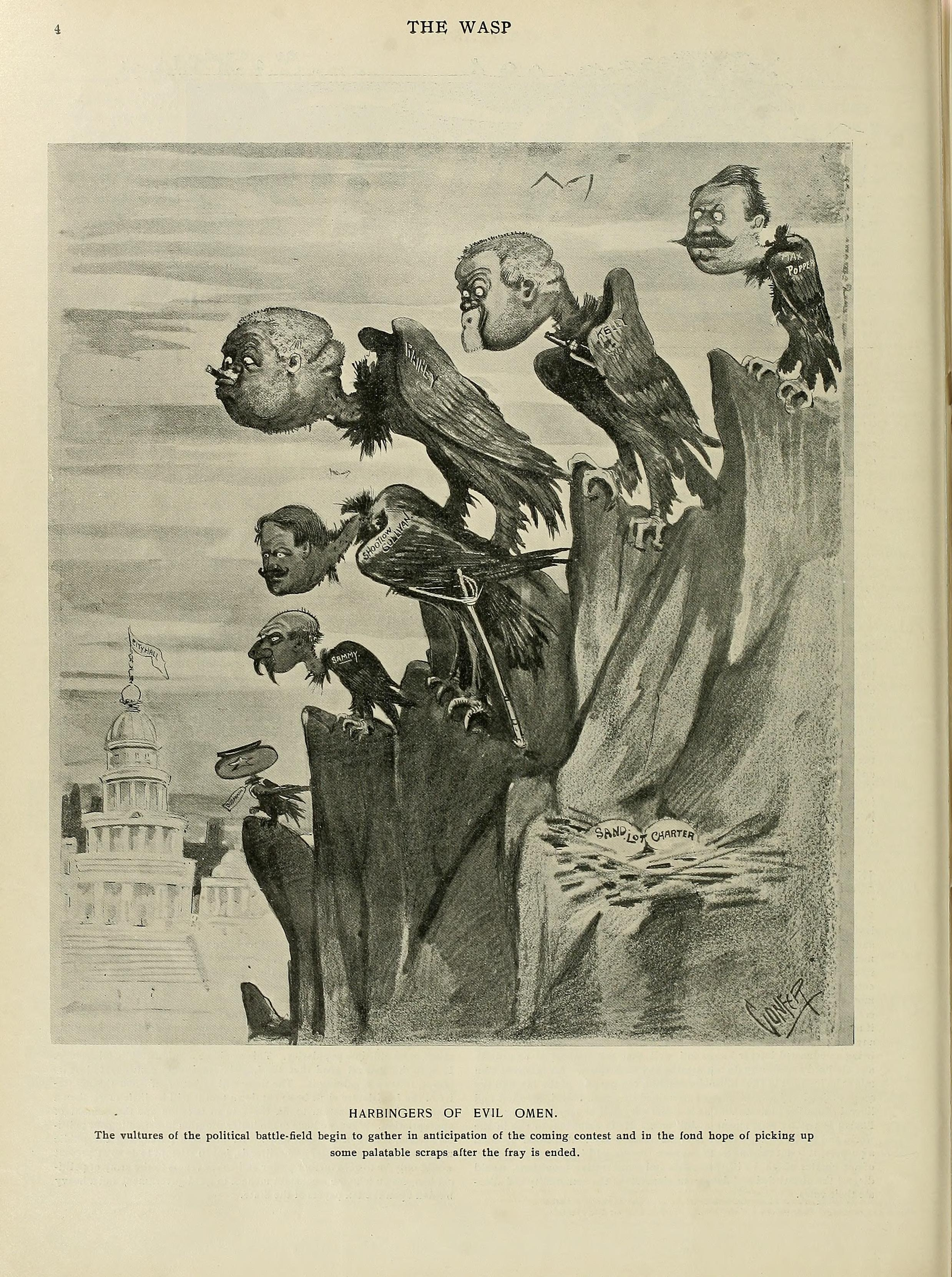
"Harbingers of Evil Omen"

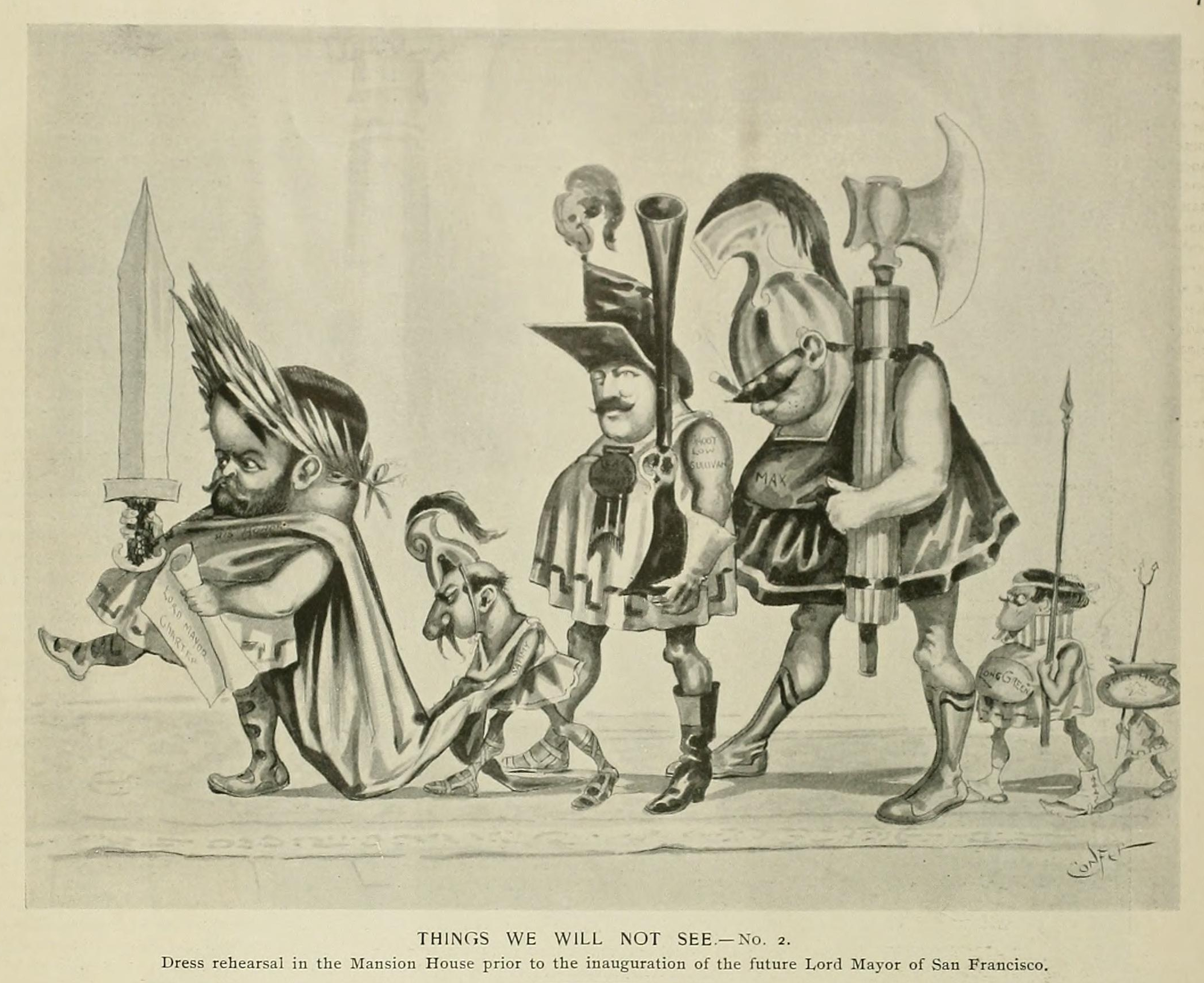
"Things We Will Not See"

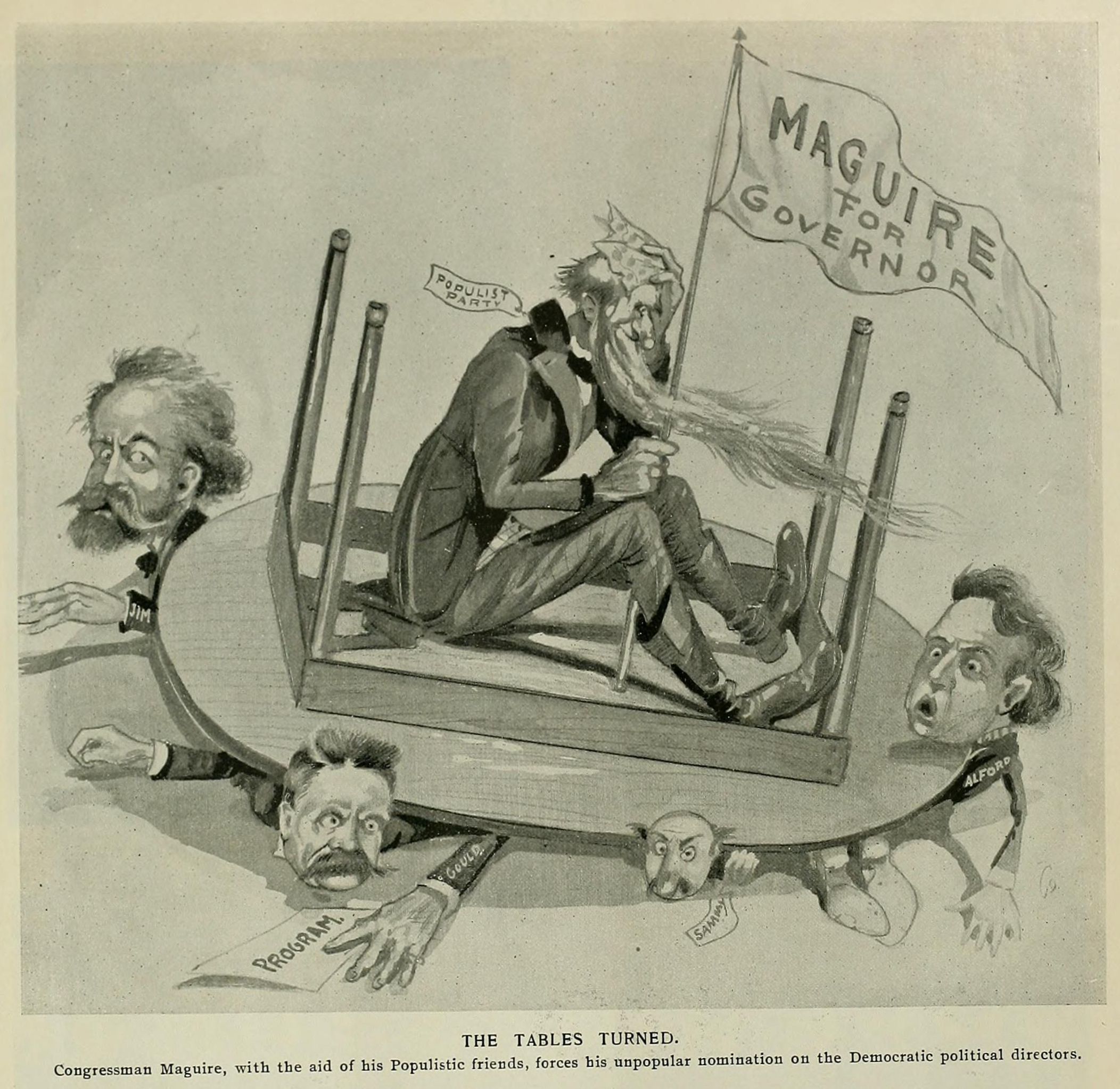
"The Tables Turned"

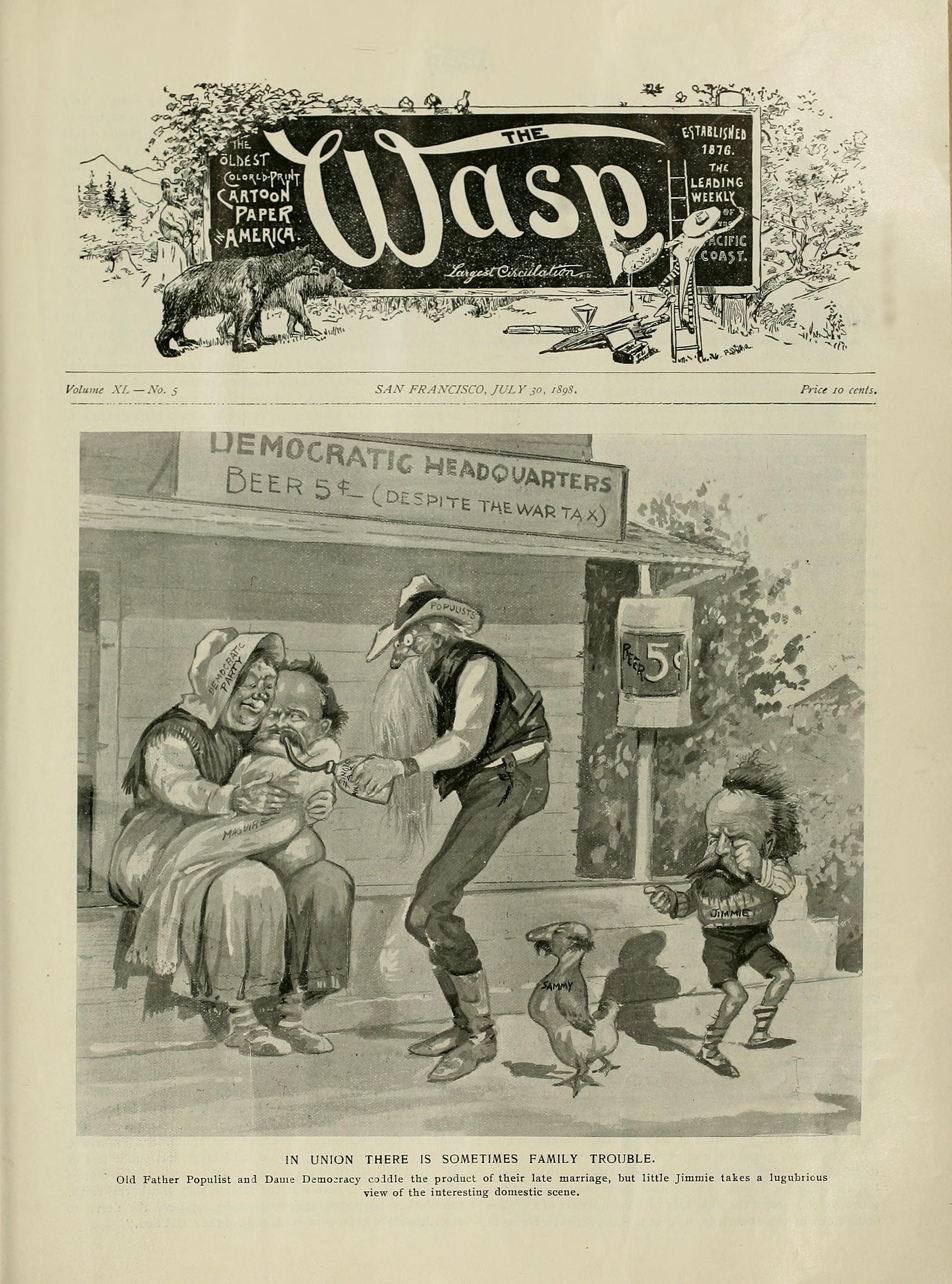
"In Union There is Sometimes Family Trouble"

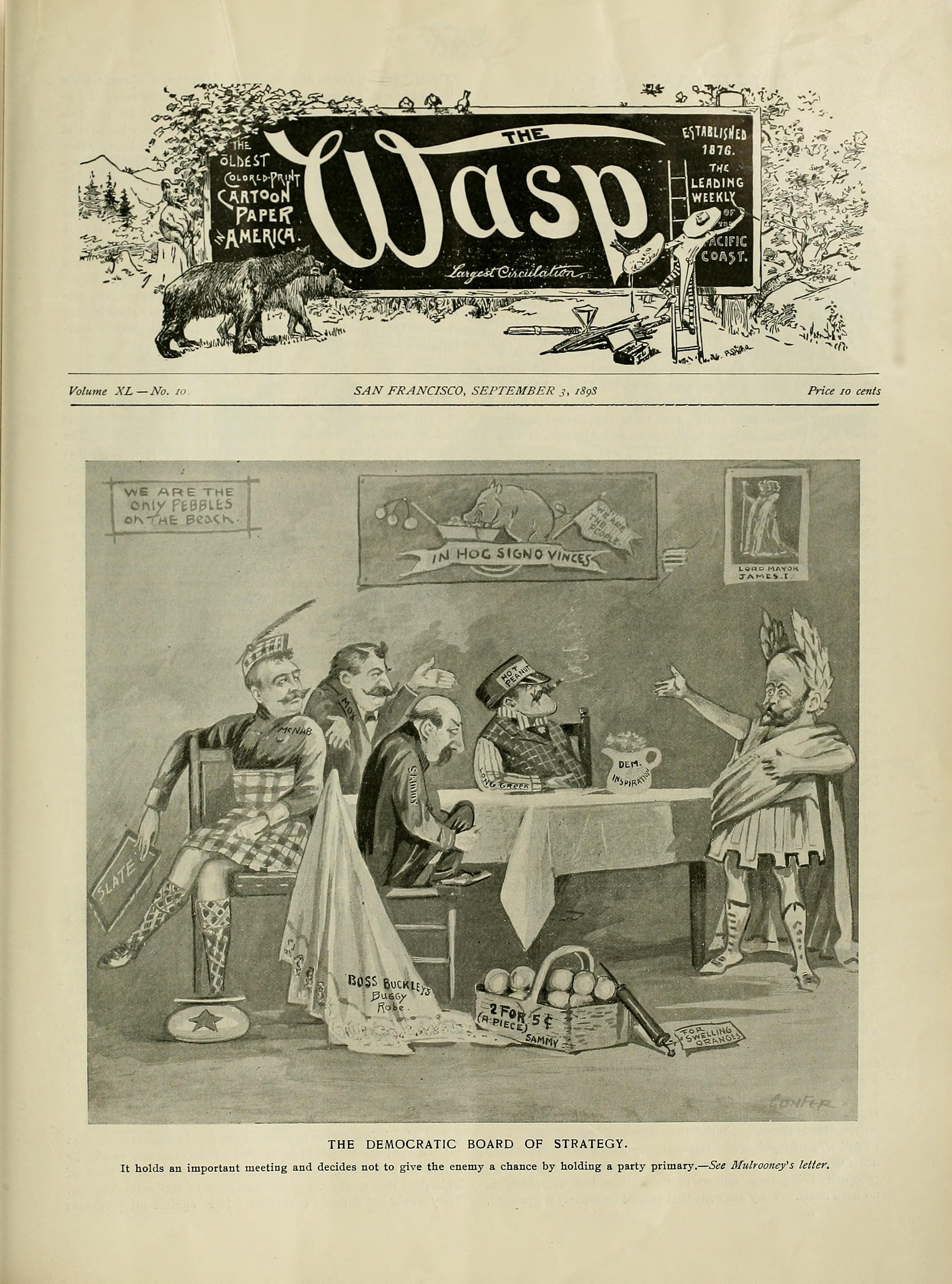
"The Democratic Board of Strategy"

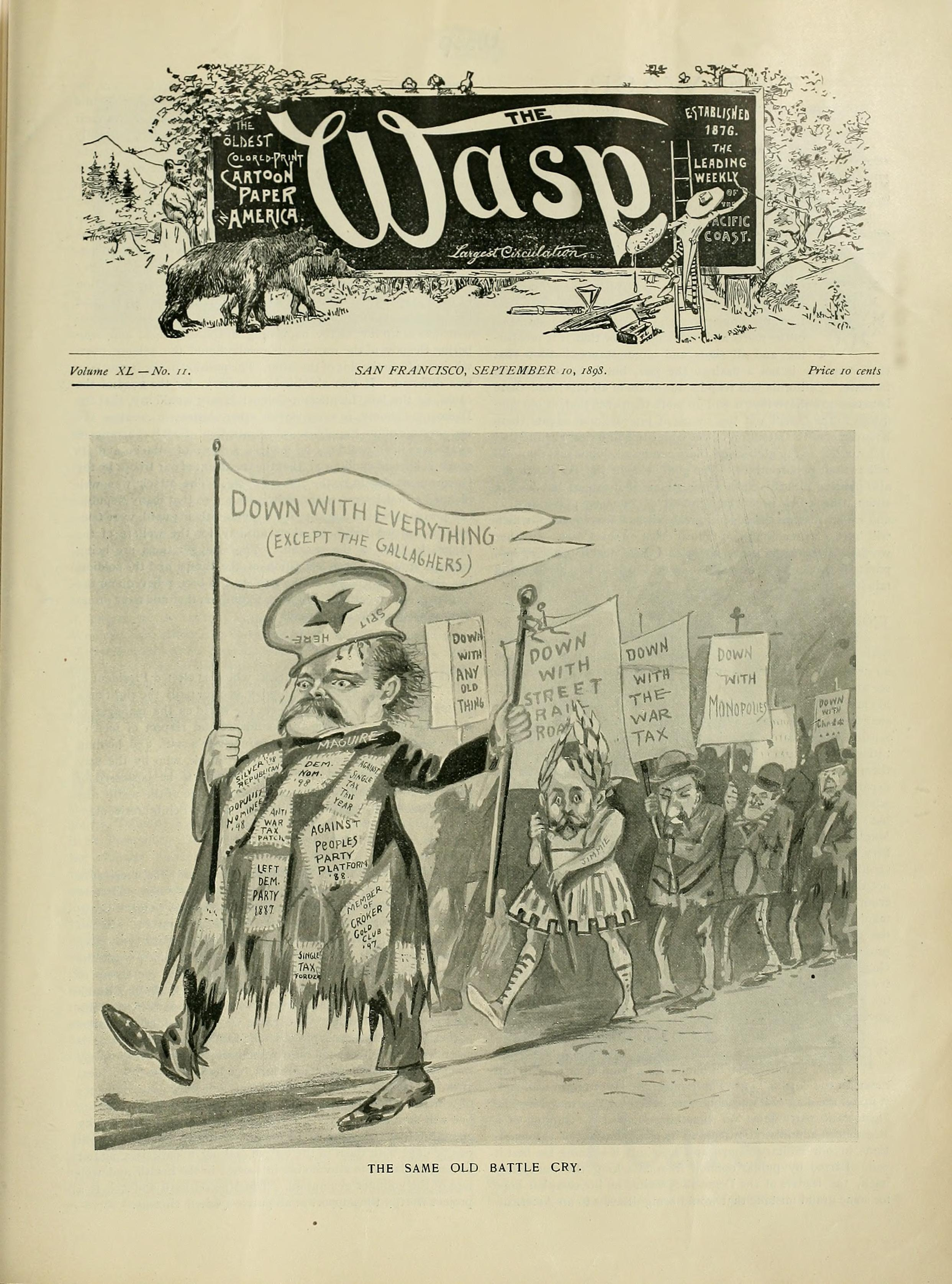
"The Same Old Battle Cry"

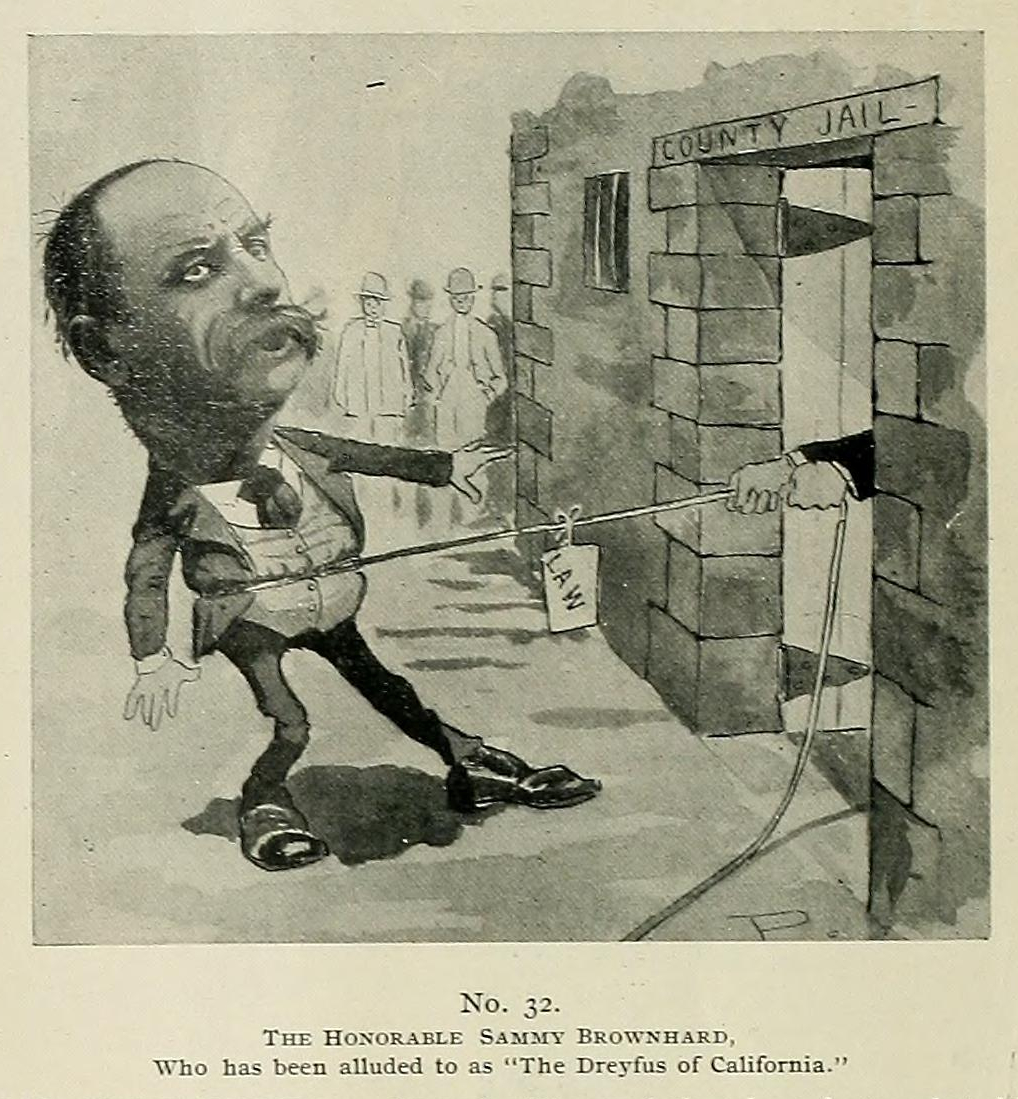
"The Honorable Sammy Brownhard"

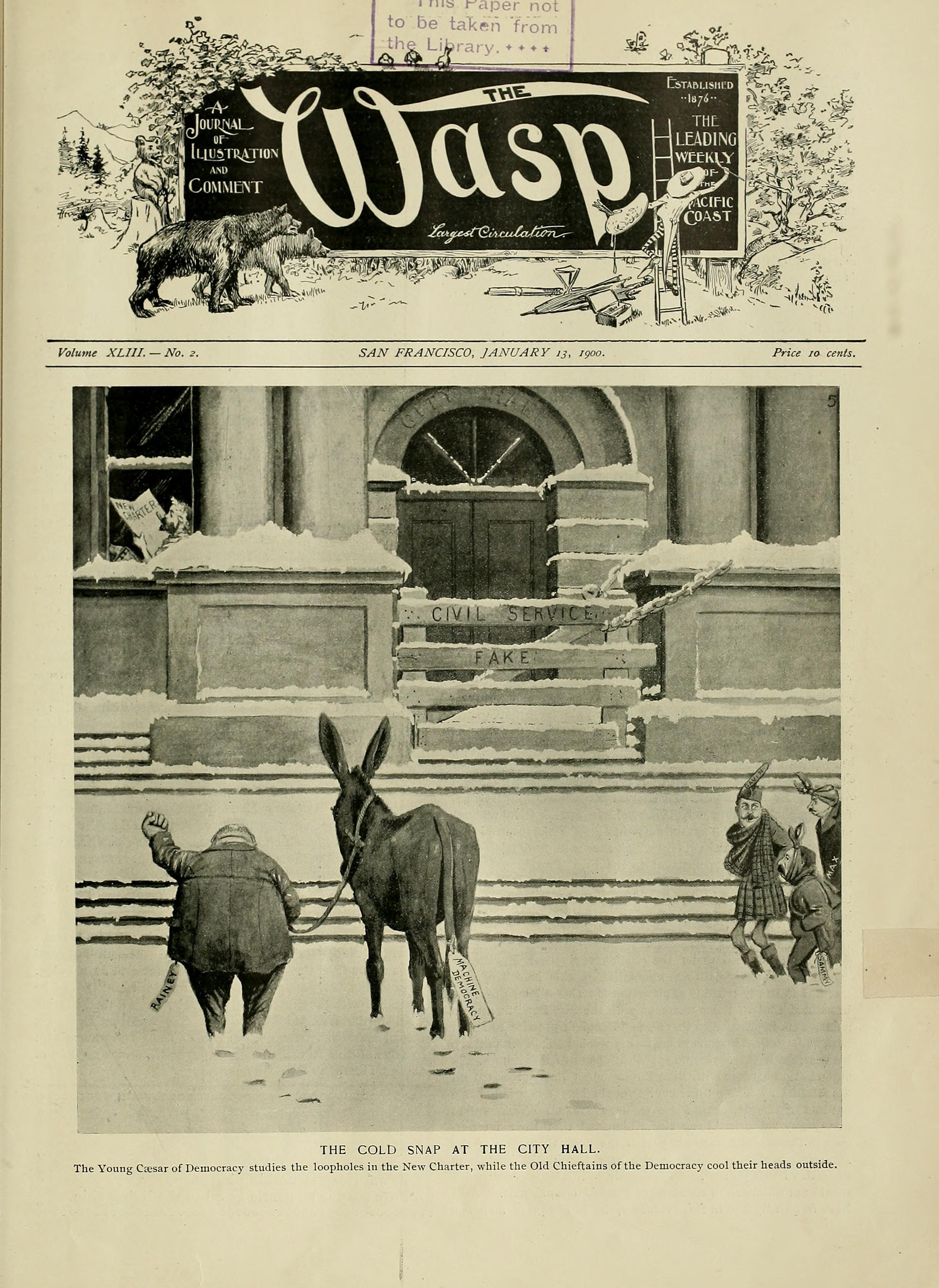
"The Cold Snap at the City Hall"

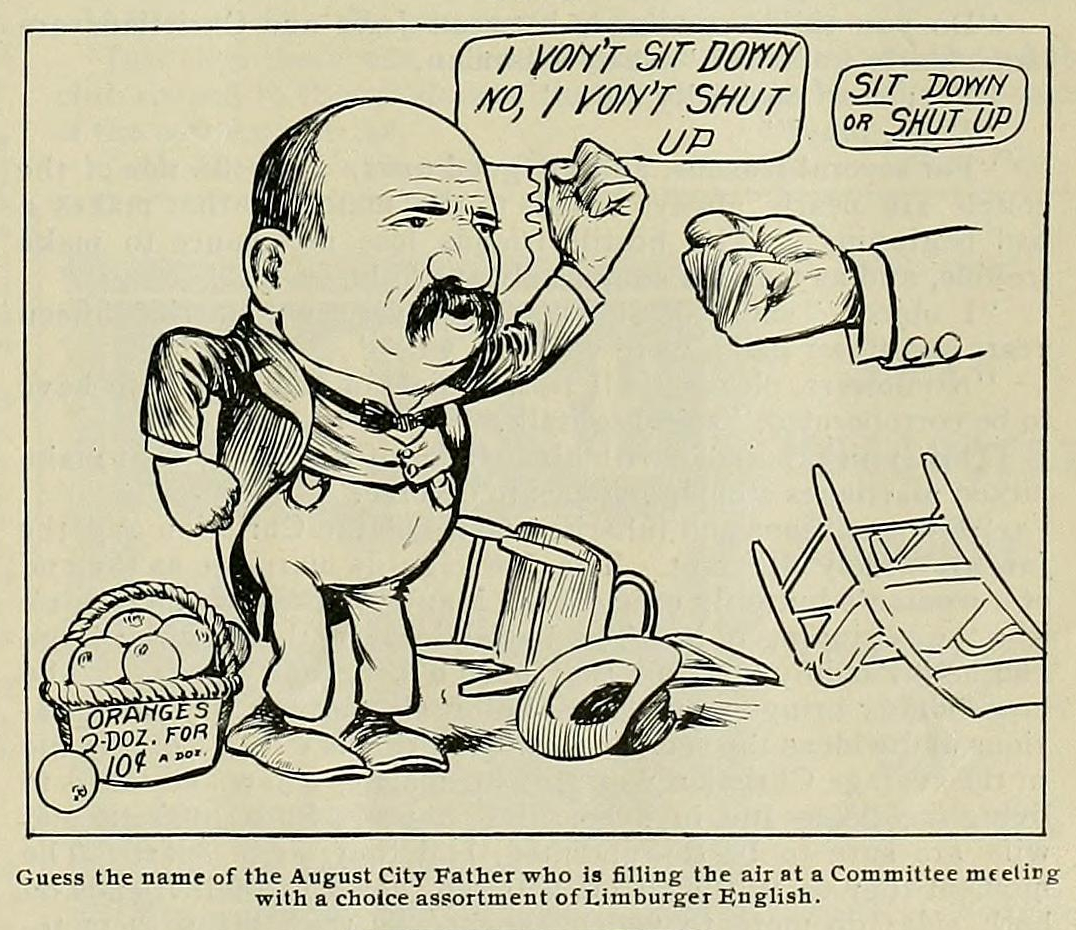
"Guess the Name of the August City Father"
