= Young Men's Institute =

The Young Men's Institute (YMI) is a Catholic fraternal organization.

== Foundation ==
It was founded on 4 March 1883, at St. Joseph's Parish Hall at 10th & Howard, in San Francisco, California, United States. The six founders were:

- John J. McDade, the first grand president and subsequently first supreme president, known as the "Father of the Order"
- James Smith, who later became a member of the Commerce Court in Washington DC
- Edward Sheehan
- William Ryan
- William Gagan
- George Maxwell

== Objects and purposes ==
Its objects and purposes were: "Mutual aid and benevolence, the moral, social, and intellectual improvement of its members, and the proper development of sentiments of devotion to the Catholic Church and loyalty to our country, in accordance with its motto, 'Pro Deo, Pro Patria': 'For God, For Country'".

== History ==
Membership was divided into three classes:

- Benefit members, men between 18 and 45 years old who are eligible for death benefits
- Associate members, who are not eligible for death benefits
- Honorary members who are religious.

Membership has always been limited to practicing Catholics.

The organization spread through the United States, Canada and related territories, Hawaii and the Philippines. In 1900 it had a membership of 20,000 centered in California. It was strongly encouraged by the Archbishop of San Francisco, Patrick William Riordan and received the approbation of Pope Leo XIII and Pope Pius X, as well as the approval of various members of the Catholic hierarchy in the territories that it operated in.

== Present status ==
The Young Men's Institute (YMI) is still active in a number of Catholic parishes in California, Hawaii and Indiana. Membership is at approximately 2000 men, who are recognized as "brothers". YMI membership is now divided into four categories: benefit members (18 to 45), associate members (those over 45), junior members (those ages 13–23 attending school full-time) and Honorary members (reserved for clergy). Annual dues are nominal for benefit and social members and free for junior and honorary members.

The YMI runs a nominal death benefit program for its benefit members, a scholarship program via an essay contest, and has a national convention. In addition, the YMI hosts various sporting tournaments (i.e. bowling, golf and bocce ball), as well as an annual Red & White Mass (celebrating its anniversary) each March and a pasta bingo dinner each November. Through foundations under the YMI banner, the organization provides tuition assistance for the children of members that become deceased, as well as scholarships for seminarians to ease their path to the priesthood.
