= John J. McDade =

American politician (1856–1937)

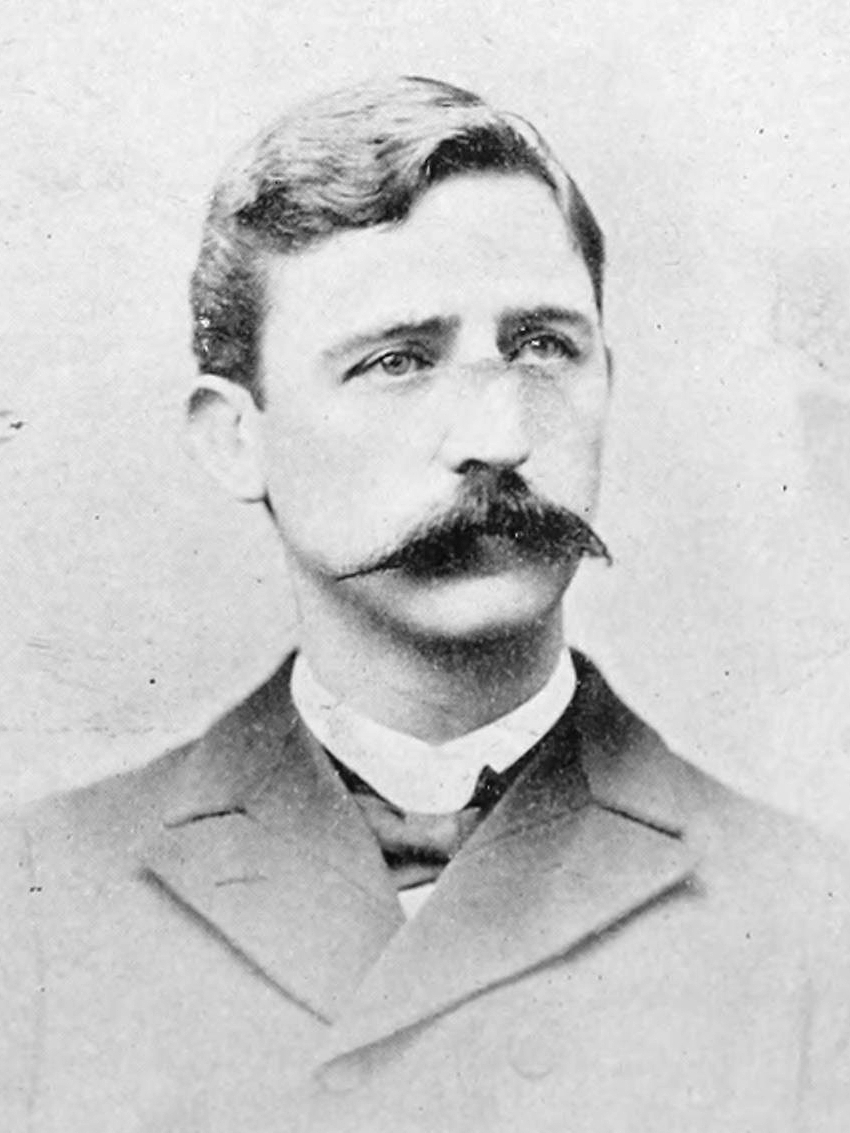
- Portrait by I. W. Taber c. 1890

Sheriff of San Francisco
- In office January 3, 1893 – January 8, 1895
- Preceded by: Charles S. Laumeister
- Succeeded by: Richard I. Whelan

Member of the California State Assembly from the 12th district
- In office January 5, 1880 – January 3, 1881
- Preceded by: Multi-member district
- Succeeded by: Multi-member district

Personal details
- Born: June 27, 1856 New York City, U.S.
- Died: November 8, 1937 (aged 81) San Francisco, California, U.S.
- Party: Workingmen's (before 1881); Democratic (after 1881)
- Spouse: Alice T. O'Neill
- Occupation: Patternmaker, educator, lawyer, politician

John Joseph McDade (June 27, 1856 – November 8, 1937) was an American patternmaker, educator, lawyer and politician who served in the California State Assembly from 1880 to 1881, as chief deputy superintendent of streets of San Francisco from 1883 to 1886, and as sheriff of San Francisco from 1893 to 1895. He also served as the first grand president of the Young Men's Institute.

During his tenure as sheriff, McDade was noted for appointing a woman, May Simpson, as a deputy. He was nominated for the State Board of Equalization in 1902, but withdrew just days later after his physician advised him that he was not healthy enough to campaign.

== Illustration gallery ==
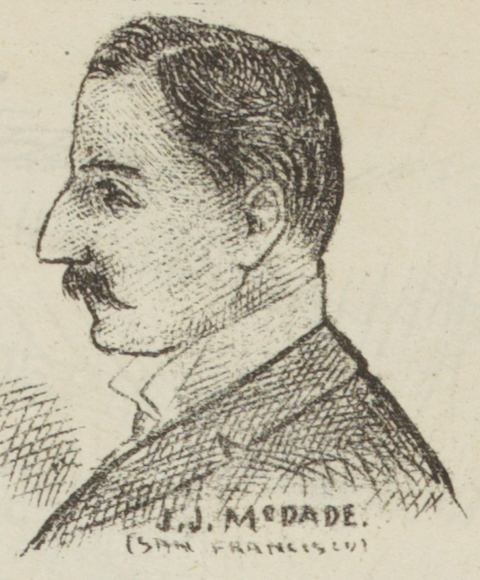
1880 sketch by Carl Browne

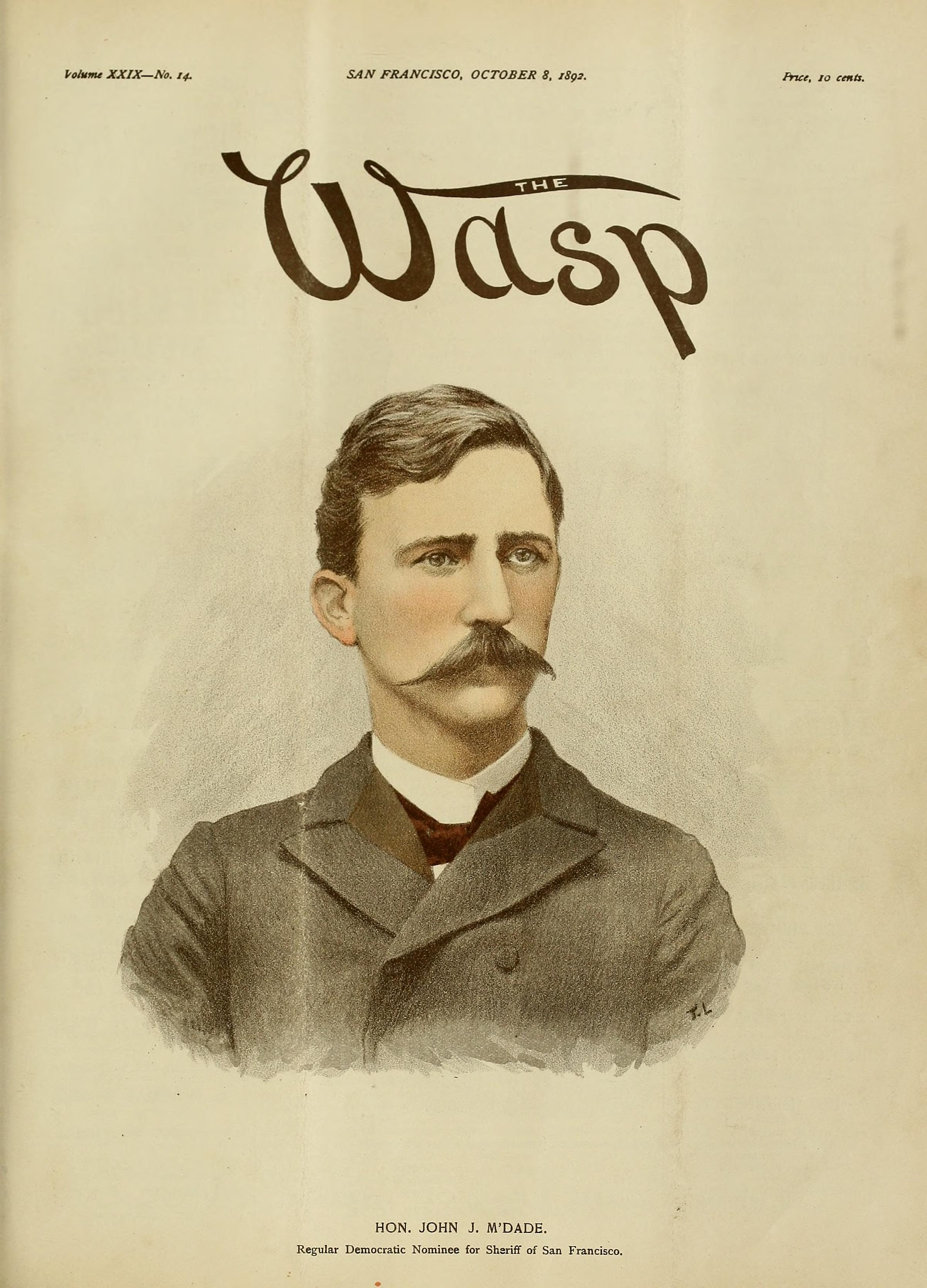
Cover of The Wasp, October 8, 1892

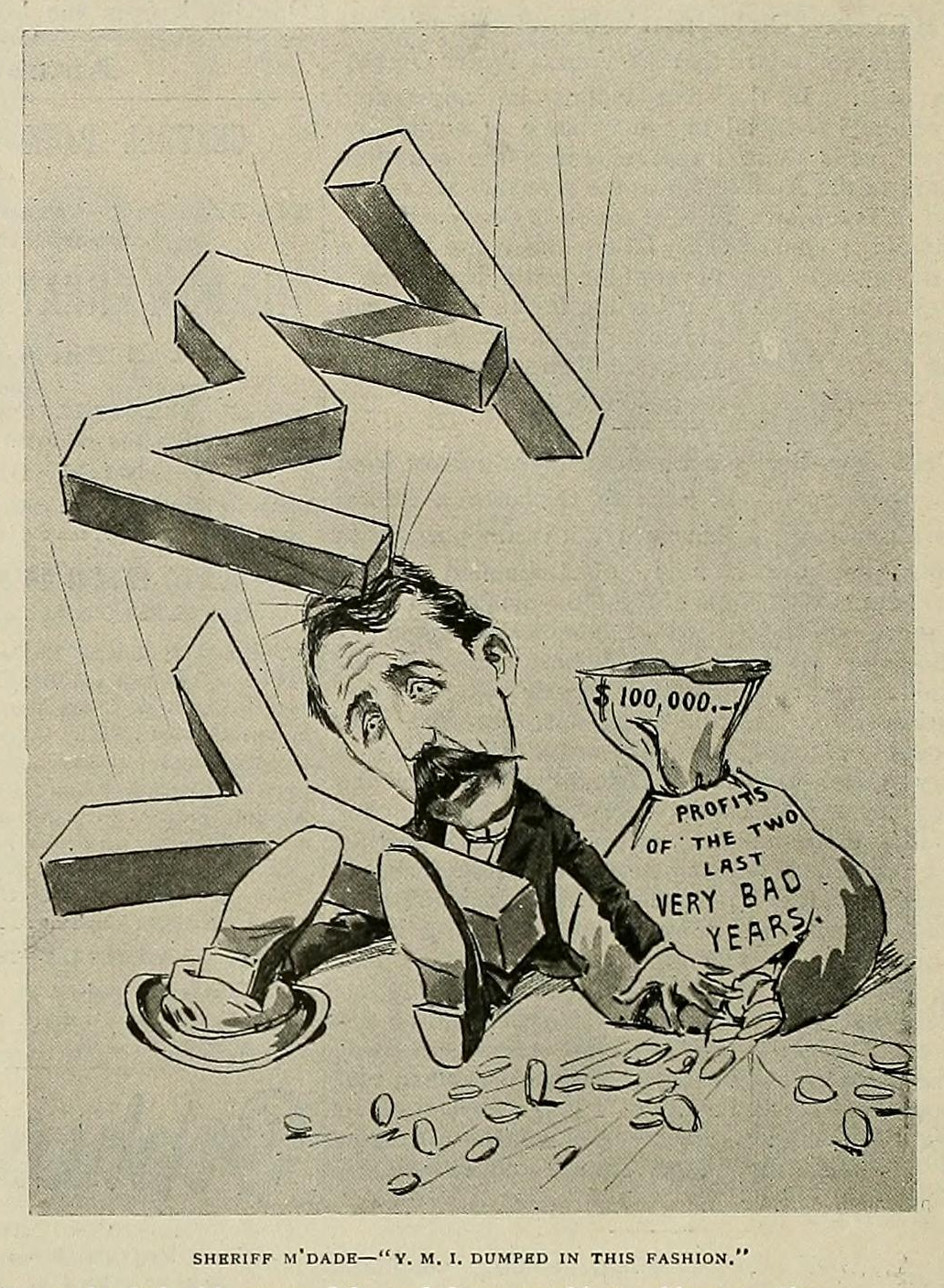
"Sheriff M'Dade— Y. M. I. Dumped in This Fashion"

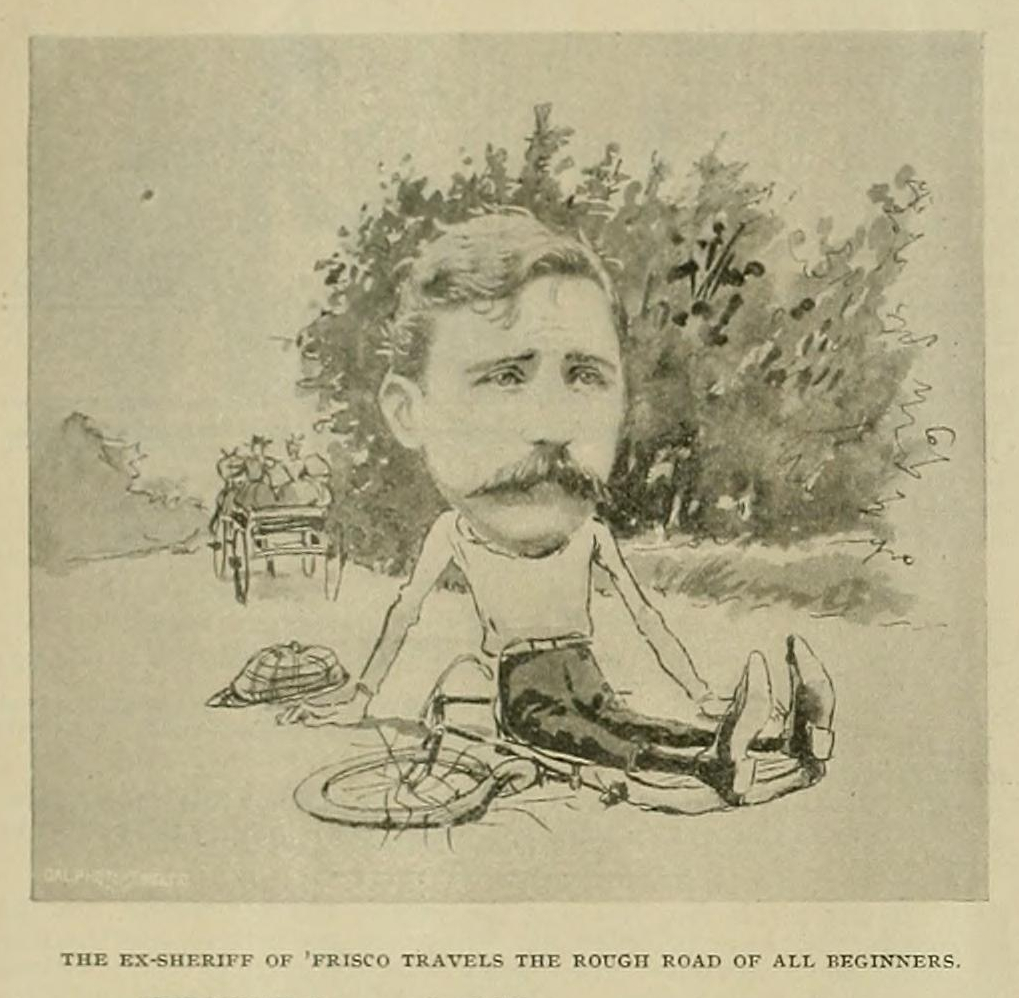
"The Ex-Sheriff of 'Frisco Travels the Rough Road of All Beginners"

== Sources ==
- "JOHN J. M'DADE". The Wasp. Vol. XXIX, no. 14. October 8, 1892. p. 4.
- ""THE WAVE'S" PORTRAIT ALBUM". The Wave. Vol. IX, no. 13. September 24, 1892. p. 1.
- "JOHN J. McDADE". The Wasp. Vol. XXXI, no. 25. December 25, 1893. p. 24.
- "JOHN J. McDADE". The Wave. Vol. XI, no. 51. December 23, 1893. p. 20.
- "SHERIFF J. J. McDADE". San Francisco News Letter. Vol. XLVIII, no. 26. June 30, 1894. p. 43.
- Weeks, George F. (1894). The Official California World's Fair Souvenir and Midwinter Fair Memoirs. San Francisco: J. E. Mitchell. p. 120.
