= Charles J. Beerstecher =

American lawyer and politician (1851–1900)

Member of the California Railroad Commission from the 2nd district
- In office January 5, 1880 – January 10, 1883
- Preceded by: Office established
- Succeeded by: William P. Humphreys

Delegate to the Second Constitutional Convention of California
- In office September 28, 1878 – March 3, 1879
- Preceded by: Office established
- Succeeded by: Office abolished
- Constituency: San Francisco

Town Attorney of St. Helena
- In office April 16, 1894 – May 12, 1896
- Preceded by: E. G. Smith
- Succeeded by: John T. York

Personal details
- Born: January 15, 1851 Urach, Kingdom of Württemberg
- Died: December 31, 1900 (aged 49) Napa, California, U.S.
- Resting place: St. Helena Public Cemetery
- Party: Republican (before 1877, after 1881)
- Other political affiliations: Workingmen's (U.S.) (1877); Workingmen's (California) (1877–1881)
- Spouse: Sophia Stiefel (m. 1877)
- Children: 5
- Education: University at Lewisburg; University of Michigan School of Law (LL.B.)

Charles Julius Beerstecher (January 15, 1851 – December 31, 1900) was a German American lawyer and politician who served as a delegate to California's Second Constitutional Convention from 1878 to 1879, as a member of the California Railroad Commission from 1880 to 1883, and as town attorney of St. Helena from 1894 to 1896.

Born in the Kingdom of Württemberg in 1851, Beerstecher and his family moved to the United States after the failed Revolutions of 1848. They settled first in Pennsylvania and then in Michigan, where he earned a law degree and opened his practice. He entered politics as a Republican and was elected a county coroner.

Beerstecher moved to San Francisco, California, in 1877, where he first joined the socialist Workingmen's Party of the United States before he joined the anti-Chinese Workingmen's Party of California. He distinguished himself as a leader of the Workingmen's delegation to the second constitutional convention, and was elected to the newly-formed railroad commission in 1879.

During Beerstecher's tenure, he strongly supported the railroads, leading to an investigation by the California State Assembly that concluded he had taken bribes while in office. He was also the target of an attempted assassination by Anthony Fischer, an old friend jealous of his success. After leaving office, Beerstecher retired to Napa County, where he owned a ranch and resumed the practice of law. He unsuccessfully ran for office several more times as a Republican, but he was appointed town attorney of St. Helena. He died in 1900.

== Early life ==
Charles Julius Beerstecher was born in Urach, Württemberg, on January 15, 1851. His father, A. W. Frederick Beerstecher, was a forty-eighter forced to flee to the United States following the unsuccessful Revolutions of 1848. His wife and son joined him in 1852, and they settled in Philadelphia, Pennsylvania.

Beerstecher attended the University at Lewisburg until 1868, when he moved with his family to Centreville, Michigan. He studied law under several lawyers and judges, including Michigan Supreme Court Justices Thomas M. Cooley and James V. Campbell, and entered the University of Michigan School of Law in 1870, graduating with a Bachelor of Laws in 1872. He practiced law in Centreville and nearby Union City for the next four years, arguing several cases before the State Supreme Court.

== Political career ==
Beerstecher c. 1879

Beerstecher entered politics as a Republican in 1874, when he was elected one of two coroners of St. Joseph County, Michigan, serving a two-year term. He was later appointed a United States commissioner for the Western District of Michigan, during which he was called to investigate obstruction of mails when a man tried to foreclose on a post office.

Beerstecher moved to California in 1877 and became active in the socialist movement, joining the Workingmen's Party of the United States and heading its German language section in San Francisco. He left the organization soon after to become a founding member of the anti-Chinese Workingmen's Party of California, contributing significantly to the party platform. At the party's 1878 state convention, he introduced a resolution recognizing "the Socialistic Workingmen's Party of the United States as a kindred organization, having for its purpose and end the emancipation of the Workingmen," which was passed.

=== Constitutional Convention ===
"A Suggestion of a New Constitutional Dress for California, by the Workingmens Party, Sept. 29th, 1878," a political cartoon by George Frederick Keller published in The Wasp depicting the Workingmen's Party of California at California's Second Constitutional Convention. One patch on the constitution shows Beerstecher with Denis Kearney, president of the WPC, captioned "For Governor of Cal. D.K. For Leut. Governor C. Beerstecher."

Later that year, Beerstecher was elected a delegate to California's Second Constitutional Convention, where he and fellow lawyer Clitus Barbour were considered leaders of the Workingmen's delegation. Barbour and Beerstecher were responsible for 33 of the 79 resolutions introduced by the San Francisco delegation. In his first speech to the convention, Beerstecher announced the party's "crusade" against monopolies and the Chinese, but rejected the charge that they were radicals, stating:

I repel and repudiate the idea that I am a communist and disorganizer. I came here to vote for the interests of all the people of this State. I came here representing the poor man, and I came here representing the rich man. I came here for the purpose of protecting the poor man's interest, and also for the purpose of protecting the rich man's interest. I do not desire the confiscation of property...

— Charles J. Beerstecher, speech in the Constitutional Convention of the State of California, September 30, 1878

Beerstecher advocated for prohibiting Chinese immigration to the state, arguing that it fell under the reserved powers left to the state governments. Beerstecher secured passage of a resolution to establish an eight-hour workday, fulfilling one of the party's campaign promises. He supported translating the proceedings of the convention into Spanish to honor the promise of equal treatment made to Californios in the Treaty of Guadalupe Hidalgo. He also supported Spanish-language proceedings and translations at the local level, citing the Treaty and the fact that Michigan, Wisconsin, and Pennsylvania published their laws in other languages. However, the convention voted against amendments supporting bilingualism.

=== Railroad Commission ===
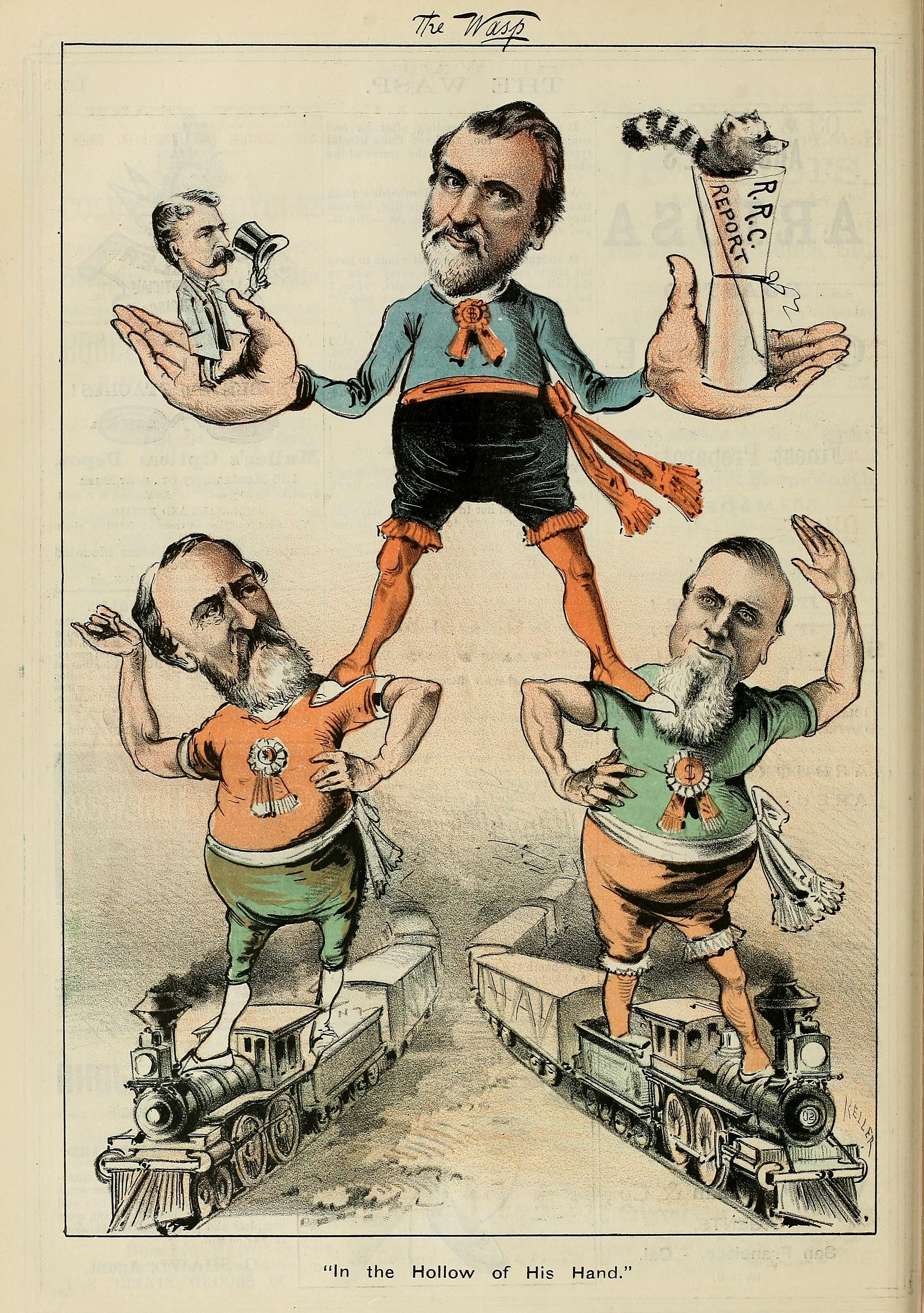
"In the Hollow of His Hand," a political cartoon by George Frederick Keller published in The Wasp depicting Beerstecher and Cone as puppets of railroad magnates Leland Stanford, Collis Potter Huntington and Charles Crocker.

The Constitution of 1879 established the California Railroad Commission, a directly-elected three-member body, paid high salaries of $4,000 to avoid bribery, charged with regulating the state's railroads, with the Central Pacific being the largest, through setting freight rates and examining corporate records. Beerstecher defeated five other candidates in the 1879 election for a seat on the commission from the 2nd district. The first three members of the commission were pro-railroad Republican J. S. Cone representing northern California, anti-railroad Democrat George Stoneman representing southern California, and Beerstecher representing San Francisco.

Stoneman hoped to ally with Beerstecher to "take care of the interests of the people," but Beerstecher soon sided with Cone in taking a pro-railroad stance. When complaints against the railroads were filed, Cone and Beerstecher directed them to company officials instead of investigating them themselves. The two also co-authored reports warning against "hasty, inconsiderate action" in dealing with the railroads, justifying their own inaction by claiming that the state's railway network had developed faster than the state could keep up with it and therefore rate reform was premature.

The commission was heavily criticized for its perceived corruption and failure to enact rate reform. Stoneman was elected governor in 1882 on an anti-railroad platform and soon after the commission's term ended the California State Assembly opened an investigation into their conduct. The report, released on February 26, 1883, "excoriated" all three men for their inaction. Although Stoneman was criticized for his poor attendance and inability to understand the railroad's accounting system, the greatest charges were leveled against Cone and Beerstecher, who the committee accused of accepting favors from the railroad. In Beerstecher's case, the committee could find "no other explanation than that he was bribed" for the fact that he had made $11,000 while in office. He claimed he had saved the money from his salary while living with his parents and maintaining his law practice, but the committee was not convinced. None of the men were ever prosecuted after the report was published.

== Attempted assassination ==
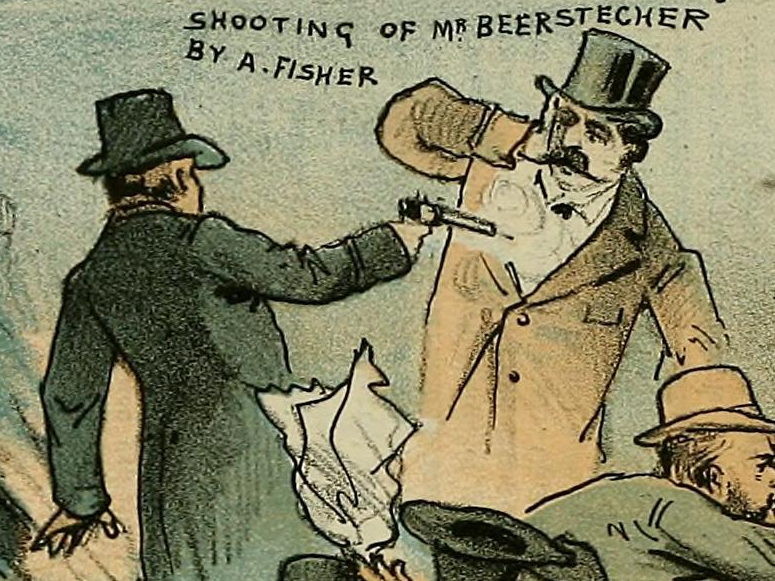
An illustration by George Frederick Keller published in The Wasp depicting Beerstecher's attempted assassination by Anthony Fischer, April 9, 1881

At around 10:45 pm on December 12, 1880, Beerstecher hopped off of a streetcar on Steiner street and was approaching his home when he saw a man crouched by a fence who he soon recognized as Anthony Fischer. Fischer, a trunkmaker and socialist who Beerstecher considered a friend, was the former president of the German Workingmen's Club and the party's unsuccessful candidate for county recorder in the previous year's municipal elections. He had been waiting for Beerstecher to return home for the last two hours, hoping to ask for a political appointment.

Beerstecher apologized for making him wait and invited him inside, but Fischer declined, saying it was too late and they would wake up Beerstecher's parents. Fischer walked Beerstecher to the gate and then, without warning, drew a revolver and shot him in the chest. The bullet hit Beerstecher in the left breast, glancing off a rib, and lodging itself in the fatty tissue near his armpit. Unsure if he had been hit, Beerstecher jumped into the garden and took cover behind a tree. Fischer tried to shoot again, but his gun misfired; Beerstecher fled into a neighboring grocery store. Fischer began to chase after him but stopped halfway, choosing instead to run down Sacramento street towards a cemetery. Beerstecher eventually made his way back to his home, where a doctor treated his wound.

In a statement to The San Francisco Call, Beerstecher claimed that he had no idea why Fischer would want to kill him, and that there was no animosity between the two of them. Police worried that Fischer would try to kill himself, but he was found and arrested the following morning. He denied having any recollection of shooting Beerstecher, but he admitted that he had been planning to assassinate certain stockbrokers and mayor Isaac Smith Kalloch that day. Papers theorized that, in light of his own defeat, Fischer was jealous of Beerstecher's election as rail commissioner and felt that he was owed an office for the work he had done for the party.

Fischer went to trial on May 19, 1881, and was charged with "assault with a deadly weapon, with intent to do great bodily harm." By this time Beerstecher had recovered, but doctors left the bullet in his body as it had nested close to his heart and they felt an operation to remove it would be too dangerous. The prosecution pursued the jealousy theory and Beerstecher's testimony was corroborated by his parents and August Pracht, the grocer whose store he fled into. Fischer pled insanity, with the defense pointing to his lack of a motive, the testimony of his relatives that he had fallen into a depression leading up to the shooting, and two notes left at his home right before the shooting that implied he would commit suicide. Fischer was found guilty the next day and sentenced to two years in San Quentin.

== Later life ==
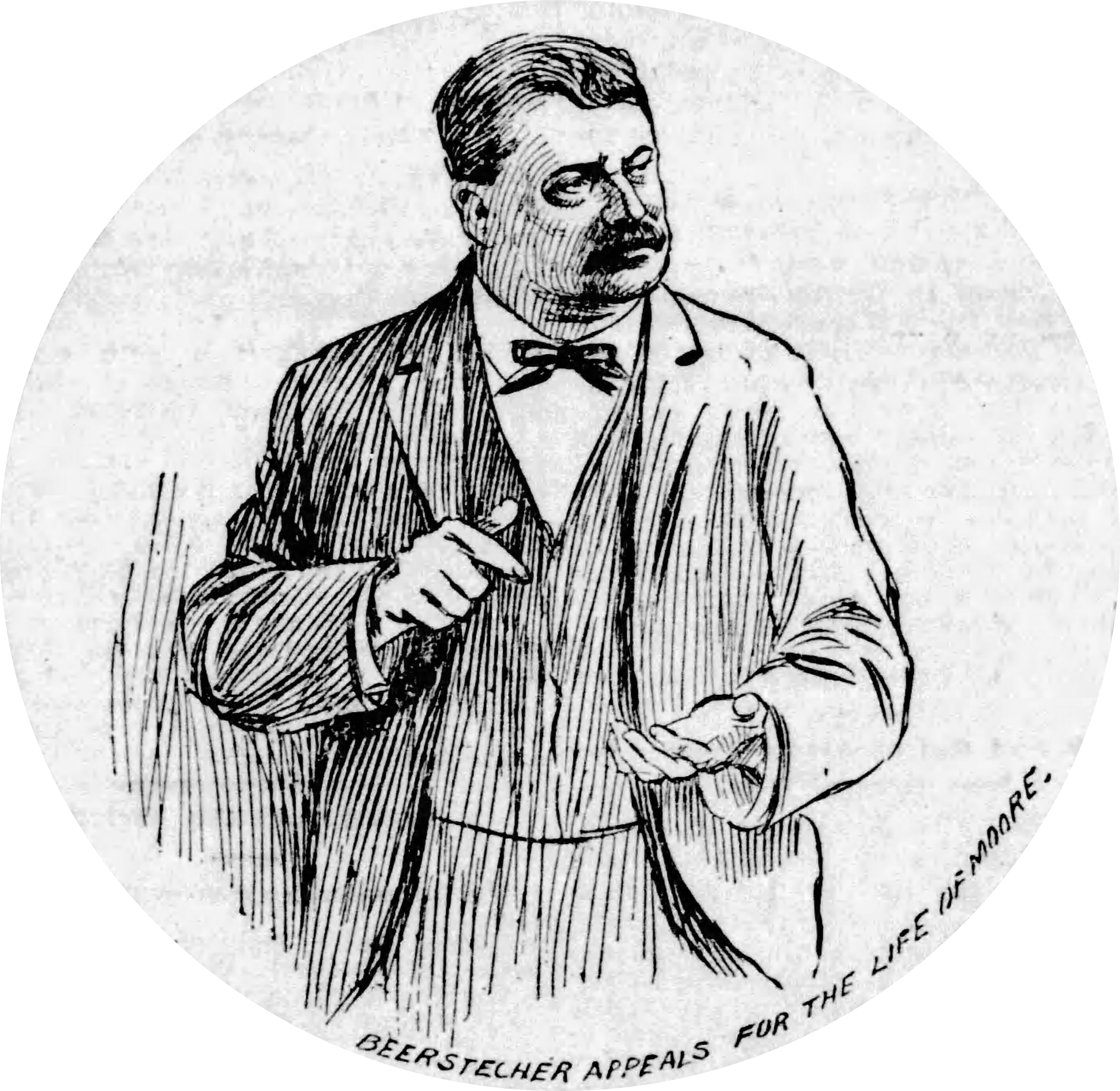
An illustration of Beerstecher as defense attorney for William Roe published in the San Francisco Chronicle, November 20, 1896

While serving as Railroad Commissioner, Beerstecher purchased a $3,000 145.41-acre ranch near Rutherford, California, with his father, to which he retired after declining to seek reelection to the railroad commission. Among his crops were thousands of fruit trees and a 30-acre vineyard. He bought 160 more acres of land from judge Serranus Clinton Hastings and hired Chinese labor to plant another vineyard and build a winery. The ranch grew to 500 acres by 1888, but by 1893 the grapevines were killed by phylloxera and a fire destroyed the buildings.

Soon after Fischer was released from prison, he encountered Beerstecher's father while visiting St. Helena in July 1883, and was forced to leave town after police discovered he was carrying a dirk knife and Colt Navy Revolver.

Beerstecher remained politically active after leaving office. He served on the central committee of the Napa County Republican Party and was an unsuccessful candidate for state assembly in 1890, State Senate in 1892, and Napa County District Attorney in 1898, but failed to secure the party's nomination each time. He resumed the practice of law and was appointed St. Helena Town Attorney by its board of trustees, serving from 1894 to 1896. He also served as defense attorney in several high-profile local cases, including for accused murderers William M. Roe, Jesse Walters, and former Napa County Sheriff George S. McKenzie.

== Personal life and death ==
Beerstecher married Sophia Stiefel in Baltimore, Maryland, on January 4, 1877. Their first child, Eddie, died at age 5, on December 4, 1882, after being scalded by hot water. He and his wife later had four more children: Carl, Dora, Alma and Ada.

Beerstecher died on December 31, 1900, aged 49, at the Napa State Hospital, having suffered from dropsy for the last eleven weeks. The Napa County Superior Court adjourned for the day out of respect to his memory.

== Works ==
- "The Endorsement". Lewisburg Chronicle. Lewisburg. October 30, 1874.

== Caricature gallery ==
"The Railroad Commissioner's Dream"

"The Builders of the Tower of Babel--- the Confoundment To Follow"

"The Result of Insolence--- The Confusion of Tongues"

"When Will They Kick"

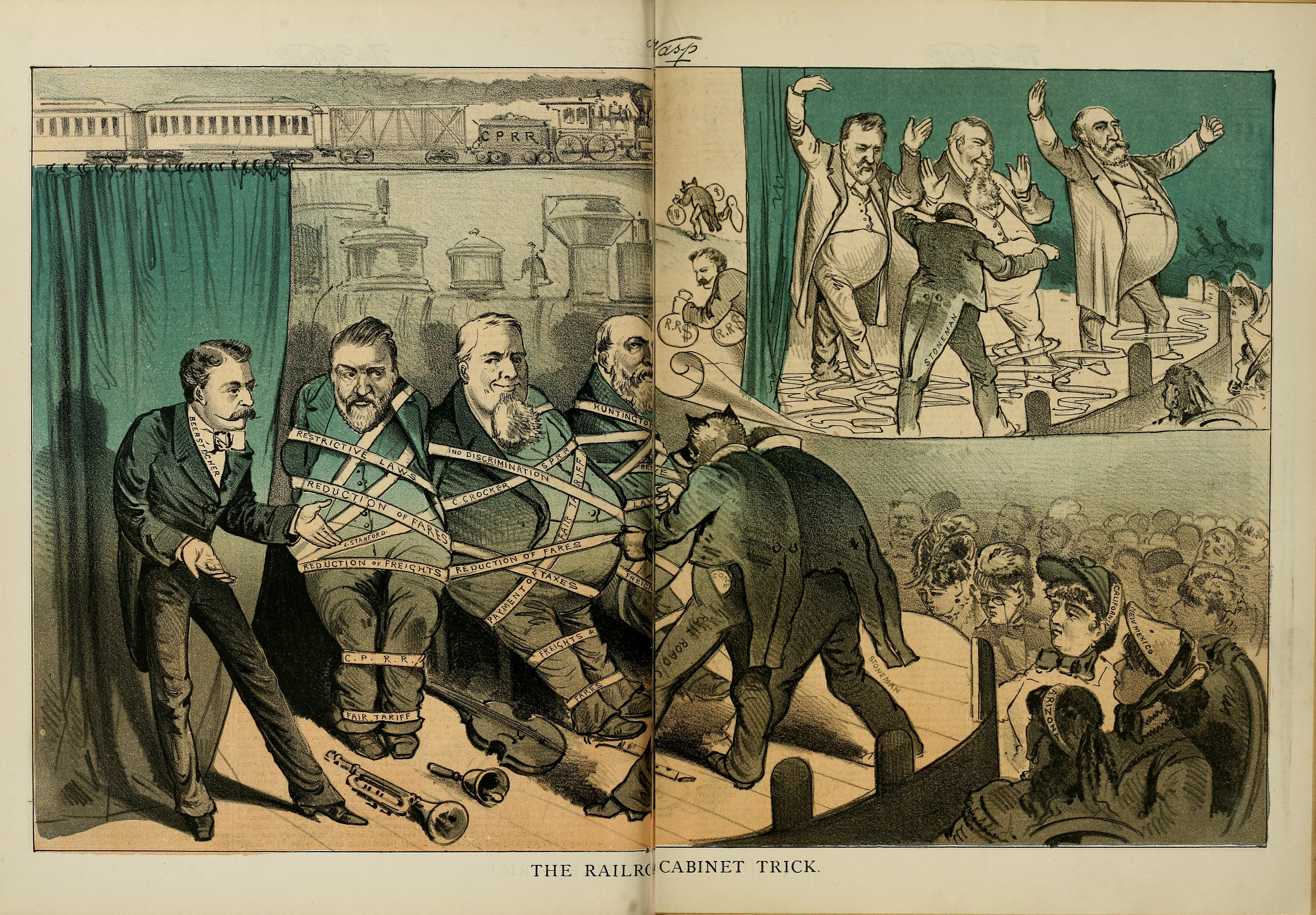
"The Railroad Cabinet Trick"

== Works cited ==
=== Books ===
- Bakken, Gordon (1990). "Constitutional Convention Debates in the West: Racism, Religion, and Gender". The Western Frontiers of the Bill of Rights. Vol. 3. The Journal of the Ninth Judicial Circuit Historical Society. ISSN 0896-2189.
- Davis, Winfield (1893). History of Political Conventions in California, 1849-1892. California State Library.
- Lozano, Rosina (2018). An American Language: The History of Spanish in the United States. University of California Press. ISBN 9780520969582.
- Saxton, Alexander (1971). The Indispensable Enemy: Labor and the Anti-Chinese Movement in California. University of California Press. ISBN 0520017218.

=== Journals ===
- Seeman, Carolyn (1999). "California's Constitutional Response to the Railroad: The Commission of 1880–1882". Southern California Quarterly. 81 (4). Historical Society of Southern California: 423–448. doi:10.2307/41171973. JSTOR 41171973.
