= Anthony Fischer =

Attempted assassin of Charles J. Beerstecher (1833–1900)

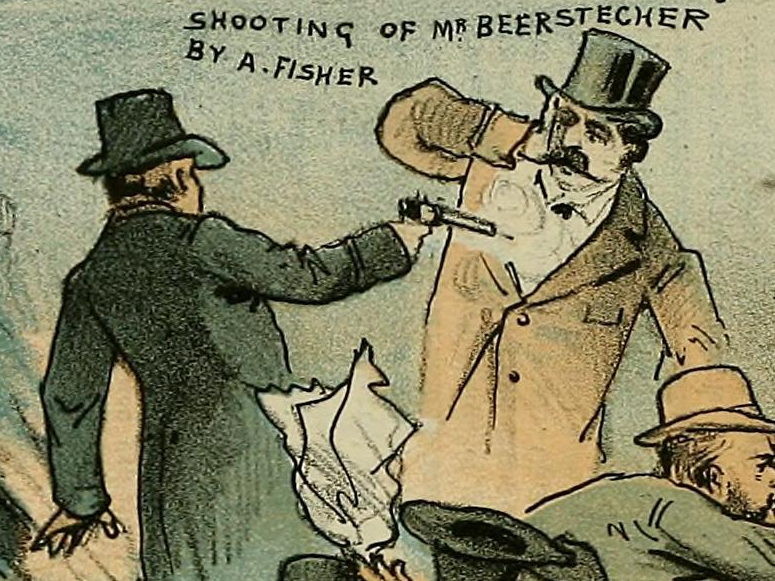
- Illustration by George Frederick Keller depicting Fischer's attempted assassination of Charles J. Beerstecher, published 1881
- Born: 1833; Danenz, Province of Hanover, Kingdom of Prussia
- Died: July 18, 1897 (aged 64); San Francisco, California, U.S.
- Political party: Workingmen's (U.S.) (1877); Workingmen's (California) (1877–1879); Republican (after 1879)
- Status: Released in 1883
- Motive: Disputed, jealousy or insanity
- Conviction: Assault with a deadly weapon
- Penalty: 2 years in prison

Details
- Date: December 12, 1880
- Locations: San Francisco, California, U.S.
- Injured: 1 (Charles J. Beerstecher)
- Weapon: Revolver

Anthony Fischer (Note: Anthony sometimes spelled Antony, Antone and Antoine; Fischer sometimes spelled Fisher) (1833 – July 18, 1897) was a German American trunkmaker, politician and socialist who attempted to assassinate California Railroad Commissioner Charles J. Beerstecher in 1880. Fischer, who Beerstecher considered a friend, was the former president of the German Workingmen's Club and the unsuccessful candidate of the Workingmen's Party of California for San Francisco county recorder in the previous year's municipal elections. He left the party soon after his defeat and fell into a depression.

== Early life and career ==
Fischer was born in Danenz, Prussia in 1833 and immigrated to the United States in 1856, settling in San Francisco sometime after 1863 and working as a trunkmaker. He became active in socialist politics and joined the Workingmen's Party of the United States (WPUS), through which he met Charles J. Beerstecher. The two became close friends and frequently consulted each other on political matters. Together they left the WPUS for the anti-Chinese Workingmen's Party of California (WPC), and by May 1878 the two men were headlining mass meetings of the party's German section. They both ran in the elections held that June for delegates to California's Second Constitutional Convention, but only Beerstecher was elected.

Fischer founded the German Workingmen's Club on February 28, 1879, serving as its first president until June 18, when he resigned to accept the party's nomination for county recorder. In the municipal elections held that September, Fischer was one of the only citywide candidates to lose in what was otherwise a WPC sweep. Beerstecher offered him $500 to contest the election, but Fischer declined the offer. He left the party soon after his defeat and became a Republican, securing election to the executive committee of the party's eleventh ward club. By this time, however, Fischer's mental state began to decline, and he fell into a depression.

== Attempted assassination of Charles J. Beerstecher ==
At around 10:45 pm on December 12, 1880, Beerstecher hopped off of a streetcar on Steiner street and was approaching his home when he saw a man crouched by a fence who he soon recognized as Fischer. He had been waiting for Beerstecher to return home for the last two hours, hoping to ask for a political appointment.

Beerstecher apologized for making him wait and invited him inside, but Fischer declined, saying it was too late and they would wake up Beerstecher's parents. Fischer walked Beerstecher to the gate and then, without warning, drew a revolver and shot him in the chest. The bullet hit Beerstecher in the left breast, glancing off a rib and lodging itself in the fatty tissue near his armpit. Unsure if he had been hit, Beerstecher jumped into the garden and took cover behind a tree. Fischer tried to shoot again, but his gun misfired, prompting Beerstecher to flee into a neighboring grocery store. Fischer began to chase after him but stopped halfway, running down Sacramento street towards a cemetery. Beerstecher eventually made his way back to his home, where a doctor treated his wound.

In a statement to The San Francisco Call, Beerstecher claimed that he had no idea why Fischer would want to kill him, and that there was no animosity between the two of them. Police worried that Fischer would try to kill himself, but he was found and arrested the following morning. He denied having any recollection of shooting Beerstecher, although he admitted that, had he not been arrested that day, he intended to assassinate certain stockbrokers and mayor Isaac Smith Kalloch. Papers theorized that, in light of his own defeat, Fischer was jealous of Beerstecher's election as rail commissioner, and felt that he was owed an office for the work he had done for the party.

Fischer went to trial on May 19, 1881, charged with "assault with a deadly weapon, with intent to do great bodily harm." By this time Beerstecher had recovered, but doctors left the bullet in his body as it had nested close to his heart and they felt an operation to remove it would be too dangerous. The prosecution pursued the jealousy theory and Beerstecher's testimony was corroborated by his parents and August Pracht, the grocer whose store he fled into. Fischer meanwhile pled insanity, with the defense pointing to his lack of a motive, the testimony of his relatives that he had become depressed and suicidal leading up to the shooting, and two notes left at his home right before the shooting that implied he would commit suicide. Fischer was found guilty the next day and sentenced to two years in San Quentin.

== Later life and death ==
Fischer was released on schedule and worked as a paper distributor at the city post office from 1884 to 1890. He encountered Beerstecher's father while visiting St. Helena in July 1883, and was forced to leave town after police discovered he was carrying a dirk knife and Colt Navy Revolver. Fischer committed suicide by asphyxiation on July 18, 1897, having developed a fatal illness that gave him debilitating pain for over a year.
