= Maurice Carey Blake =

19th Mayor of San Francisco from 1881 to 1883

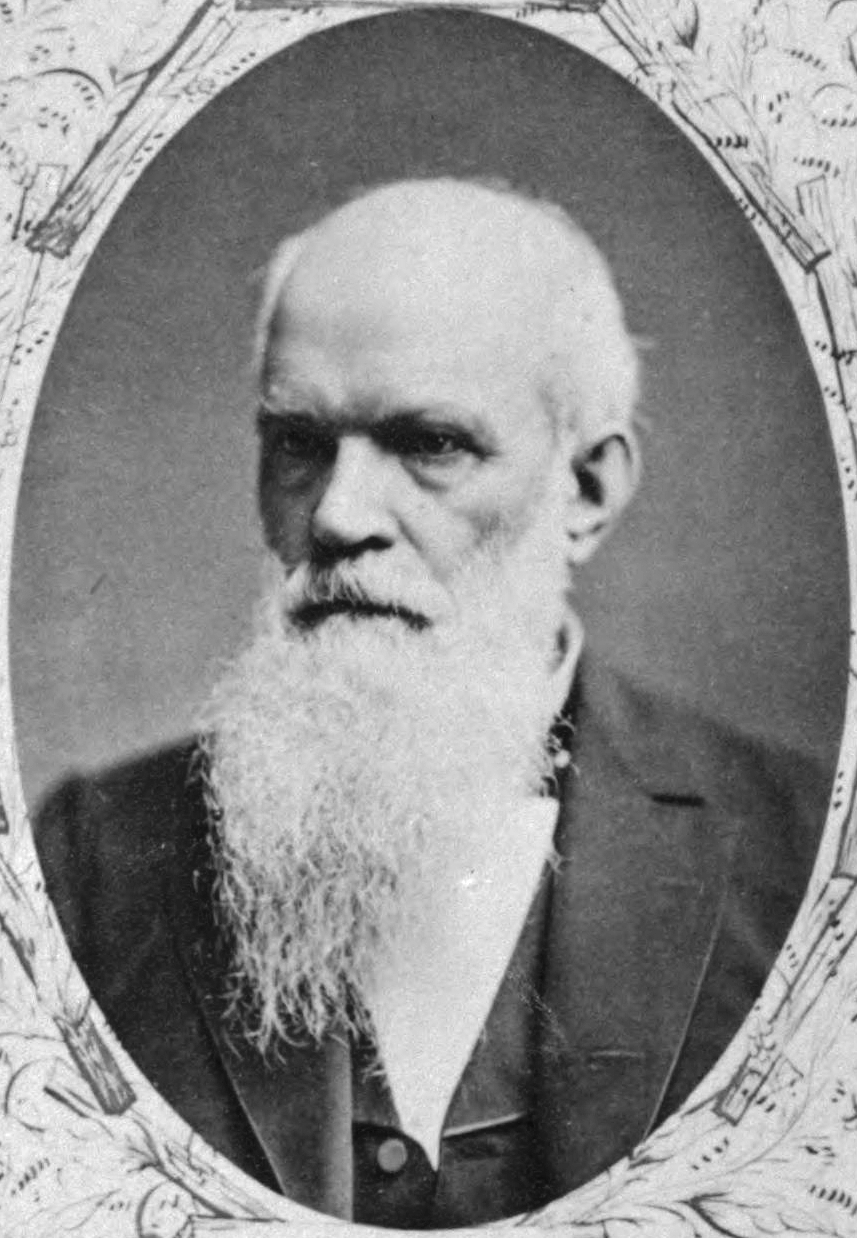
- Blake c. 1882

19th Mayor of San Francisco
- In office December 5, 1881 – January 7, 1883
- Preceded by: Isaac Smith Kalloch
- Succeeded by: Washington Bartlett

Personal details
- Born: October 20, 1815 Otisfield, Maine, U.S.
- Died: September 26, 1897 (aged 81) San Francisco, California, U.S.
- Party: Republican

Maurice Carey Blake (October 20, 1815 – September 26, 1897) was an American politician and judge who was the 19th Mayor of San Francisco from 1881 to 1883.

== Biography ==
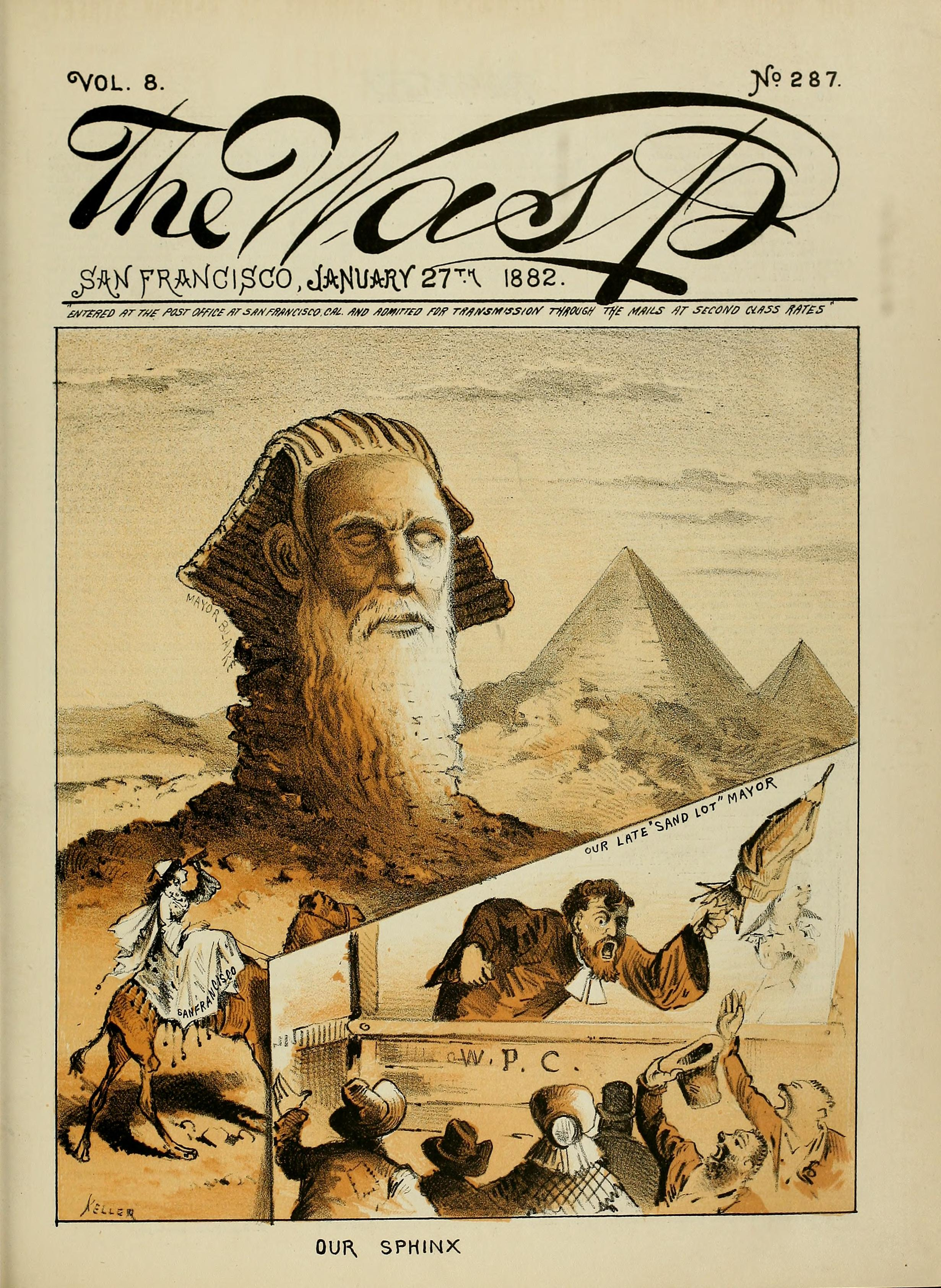
"Our Sphinx," a political cartoon by George Frederick Keller published in The Wasp depicting Blake as the Great Sphinx of Giza, January 27, 1882. An inset cartoon captioned "Our Late 'Sand Lot' Mayor" depicts his successor, Isaac Smith Kalloch, orating from a Workingmen's Party stage.

Blake was born on October 20, 1815, in Otisville, Maine. After graduating from Bowdoin College, he came to San Francisco in 1853. He became a lawyer in California and practiced law there. In 1857, he first became a county judge (which he served until 1862) and then a probate judge. At the same time, in 1857, he served as a member of the California State Assembly until 1858. In 1881, he became the Mayor of San Francisco and served for only two years. Just one year after leaving office, he became a delegate to the Republican National Convention in 1884. Blake died of a heart attack in San Francisco on September 26, 1897. He is interred at Mount Tamalpais Cemetery in San Rafael, California.

His nephew's daughter, Anna Blake Mezquida, became a writer and journalist in San Francisco.
