= Anna Blake Mezquida =

American writer (1883–1965)

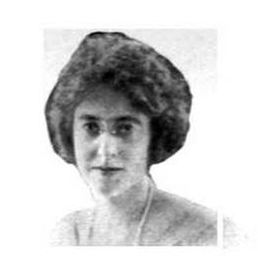
Anna Blake Mezquida, in a 1922 publication.

Anna Blake Mezquida (September 1, 1883 – March 12, 1965) was an American writer, poet, and journalist based in San Francisco.

== Early life ==
Anna G. Blake was born in San Francisco, the daughter of Maurice B. Blake and Martha Eastman Blake. Her father's uncle Maurice Carey Blake was an attorney who served a term as Mayor of San Francisco just before Anna was born.

== Experiences in the 1906 San Francisco earthquake ==
Her letters after the 1906 San Francisco earthquake are preserved as evocative eyewitness accounts of the aftermath. She was evacuated as a patient from a hospital in the city to a crowded refugee ward at the Presidio. She wrote of her fears and experiences:

The first week here was like a week in Libby Prison. Over a hundred of us were crowded together in one room of the barracks. There were rich women and poor women, white, yellow, and black, from all quarters of the city. It was impossible to keep the place clean. There was no heat, scant food, and little water. We were allowed no communication with the outside, and sentries guarded the place day and night, no one being allowed to enter but priests and nuns and wearers of the red cross.

== Career ==
Anna Blake began writing poems as a girl. In 1915, she wrote the lyrics to "The Wondrous Exposition," the theme song of the Panama-Pacific Exposition. A book of her poems, A-Gypsying, was published in 1922. Mezquida wrote short stories and articles for national magazines. She also wrote scripts for radio plays, and scenarios for films based on her short stories, and some of her poems were set to music as art songs.

In 1924, she went to Mendocino County to report on the lumber industry there. During World War II, Mezquida worked for the United States Office of Censorship and the Message Analysis Unit. She was president of the Pacific Branch of the National League of American Pen Women. She led the "Citizens' Committee to Save the Cable Car". In her last years, she taught writing courses at the San Francisco YWCA.

== Personal life ==
Anna Blake married Mateo M. Mezquida, an importer from Spain, in 1911. She was widowed when Mateo died in 1928. She survived a car accident in 1933 with significant injuries, and used a back brace for years afterwards. She died in 1965, aged 81 years, in San Francisco. Her papers are archived in the Bancroft Library at Berkeley.
