= Isaac Smith Kalloch =

18th Mayor of San Francisco and 1st President of Ottawa University

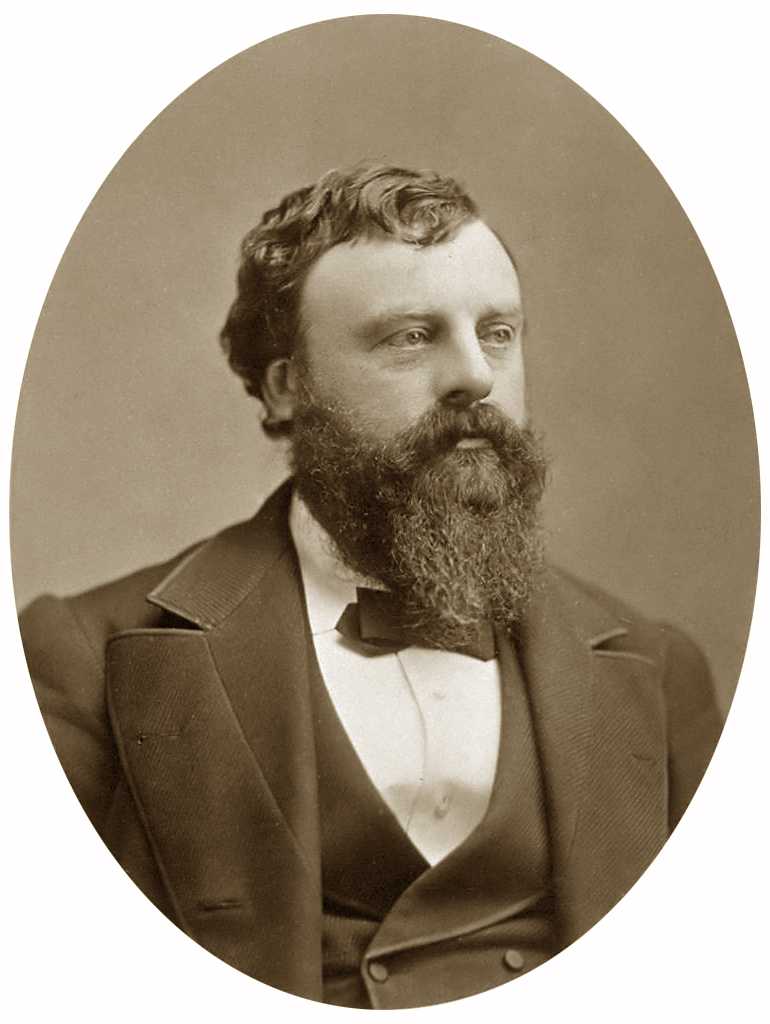

18th Mayor of San Francisco
- In office December 1, 1879 – December 4, 1881
- Preceded by: Andrew Jackson Bryant
- Succeeded by: Maurice Carey Blake

1st President of Ottawa University
- In office 1866–1868

Personal details
- Born: July 10, 1832 Rockland, Maine, U.S.
- Died: December 9, 1887 (aged 55) Bellingham, Washington, U.S.
- Party: Workingmen’s
- Profession: Baptist Minister, politician

Isaac Smith Kalloch (July 10, 1832 – December 9, 1887) was an American politician and Baptist pastor who served as the 18th Mayor of San Francisco from 1879 to 1881. He served as the first president of Ottawa University in Kansas from 1866 to 1868.

== Early life ==
He was born at Rockland, Maine and attended Colby College (Waterville College) until he was expelled in 1849 (later receiving an honorary M.A. in 1856). In the 1850s Kalloch served as a Baptist minister in Rockland, Maine and then Boston, Massachusetts at Tremont Temple from 1855 to 1860, where he was acquitted of accusations of adultery in 1857. Kalloch eventually went to New York where he served as a pastor from 1861 to 1864. He then moved to Kansas, living there from 1864 to 1875 where he was a co-founder and the first president of Ottawa University from 1866 to 1868. In 1875 he went to California looking to spread the Baptist faith.

== Mayorship of San Francisco and assassination attempt ==
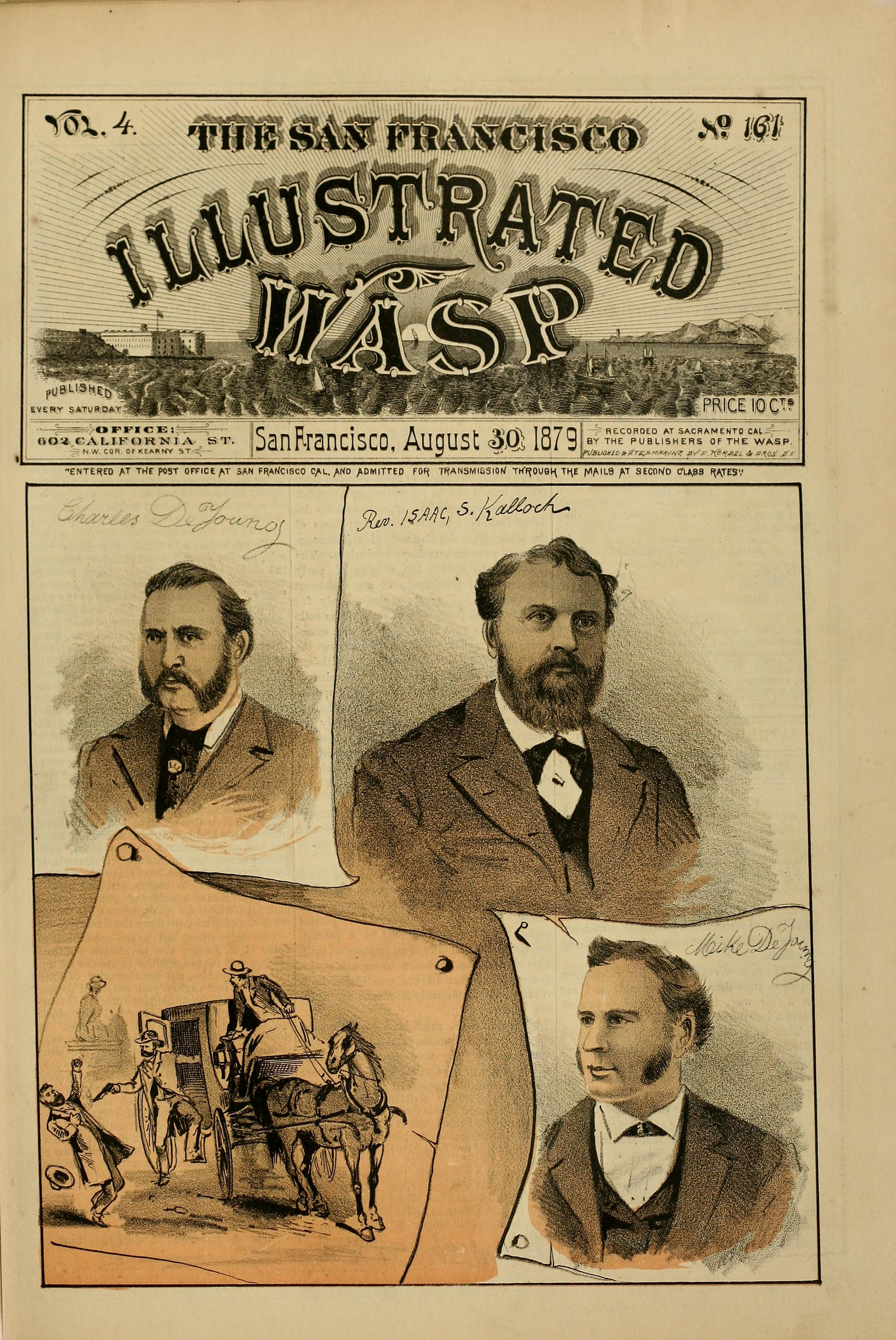
The cover of The Wasp following Kalloch's attempted assassination, August 30, 1879

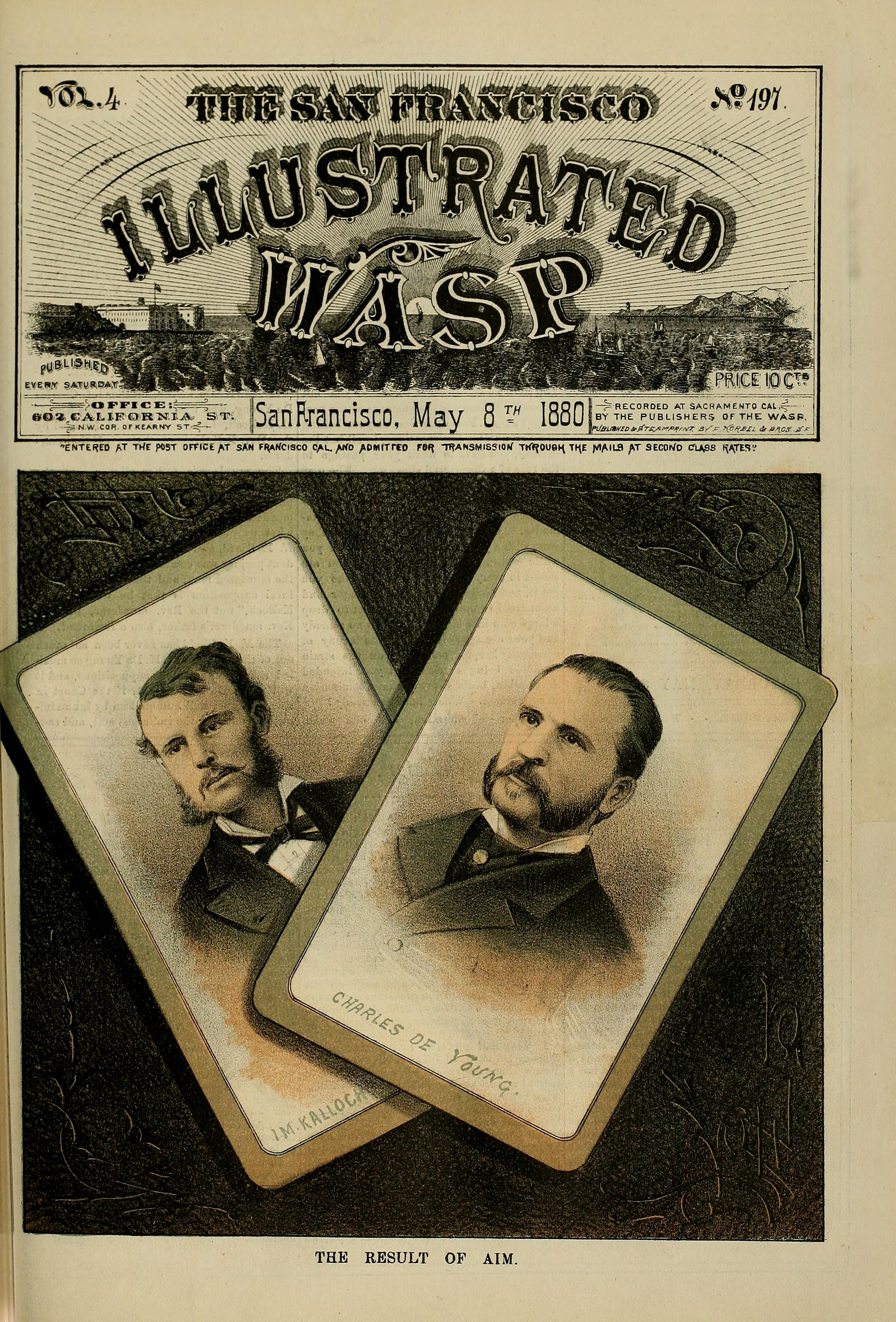
The cover of The Wasp following de Young's assassination, May 8, 1880

In 1878, Kalloch became one of the major religious leaders of San Francisco to endorse the Workingmen's Party of California. This endorsement brought himself increased fame as "workingmen flocked to his church" and his "halls were packed as never before." Because of his popular role in the San Francisco community, in 1879, the Workingmen's Party of California helped him run for Mayor of San Francisco. Kalloch's involvement in the Workingmen's Party of California has been attributed to the party looking to fulfill both the party's and its membership's spiritual needs.

During Isaac Kalloch's campaign for mayor, he came under attack from the San Francisco Chronicle's editor-in-chief, Charles de Young, who was backing another candidate. De Young, with the hopes of taking Kalloch out of the mayoral race, accused the minister of having an affair. Kalloch responded by accusing Charles' mother, Amelia, of running a brothel. In response, Charles ambushed Kalloch in the streets of San Francisco and shot him twice. [Needs Citation] Kalloch survived the wounds and, with the sympathy of voters [Needs Citation] was elected mayor of San Francisco. He served only from 1879, until 1881. On April 23, 1880, Kalloch's son, Isaac Milton Kalloch, entered the Chronicle building and shot de Young to death in retaliation. He was acquitted on the grounds that he was acting in self-defense, although many believed he had gone free simply because he was the mayor's son.

== Later life and death ==
After his term as mayor, Kalloch left San Francisco and moved to the Washington Territory. He died of diabetes in Bellingham, Washington, aged 55.

== Caricature gallery ==
"A 'Model' Candidate for Mayor"

"The Sand Lot 'Standard Bearer' for Mayor"

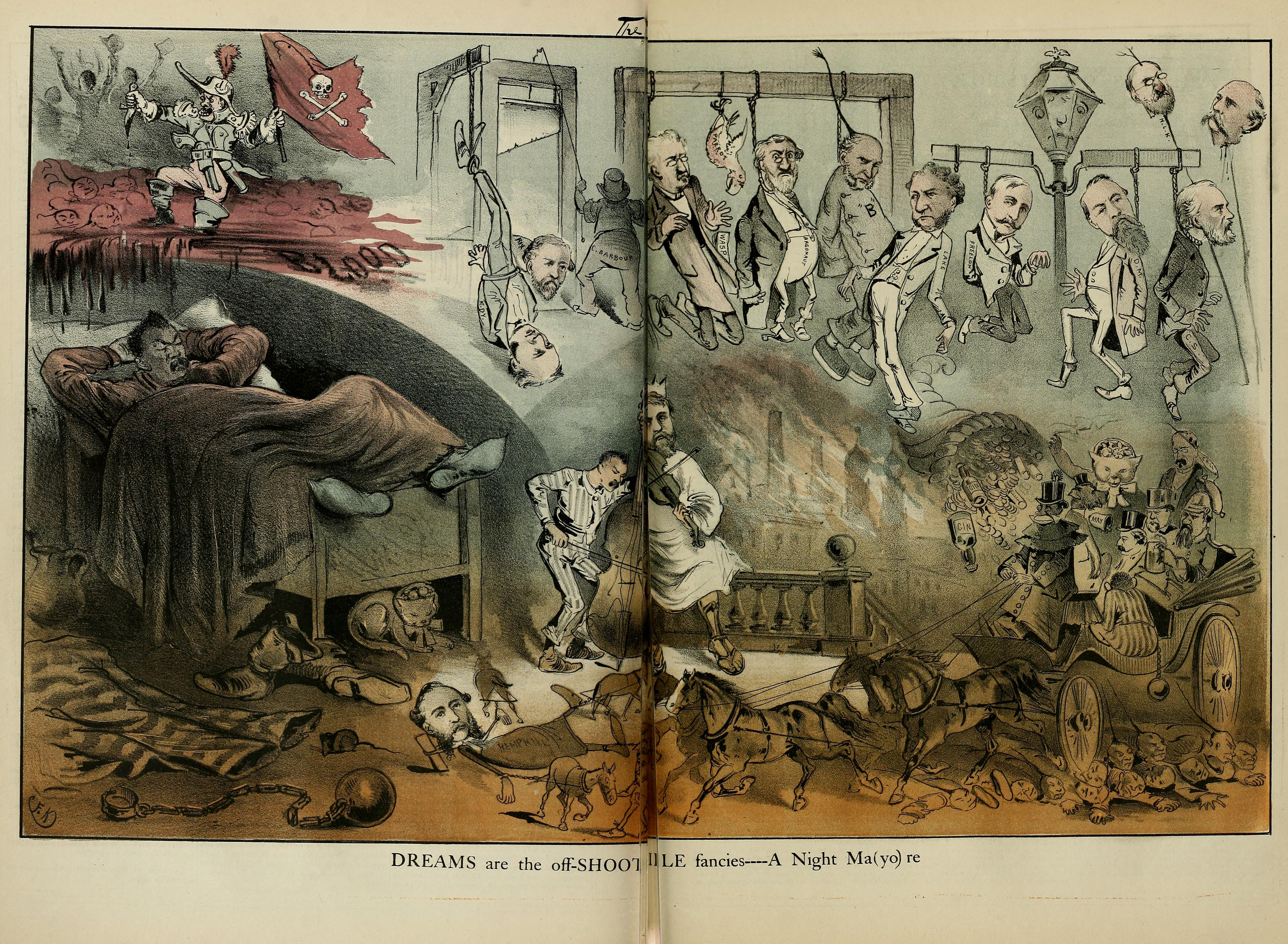
"DREAMS are the off-SHOOT... fancies----A Night Ma(yo)re"

"Trying to Jump Through the Eye of a Needle"

"San Francisco's Easter Egg"

"The Modern Alchemists—Turning Water Into Gold"

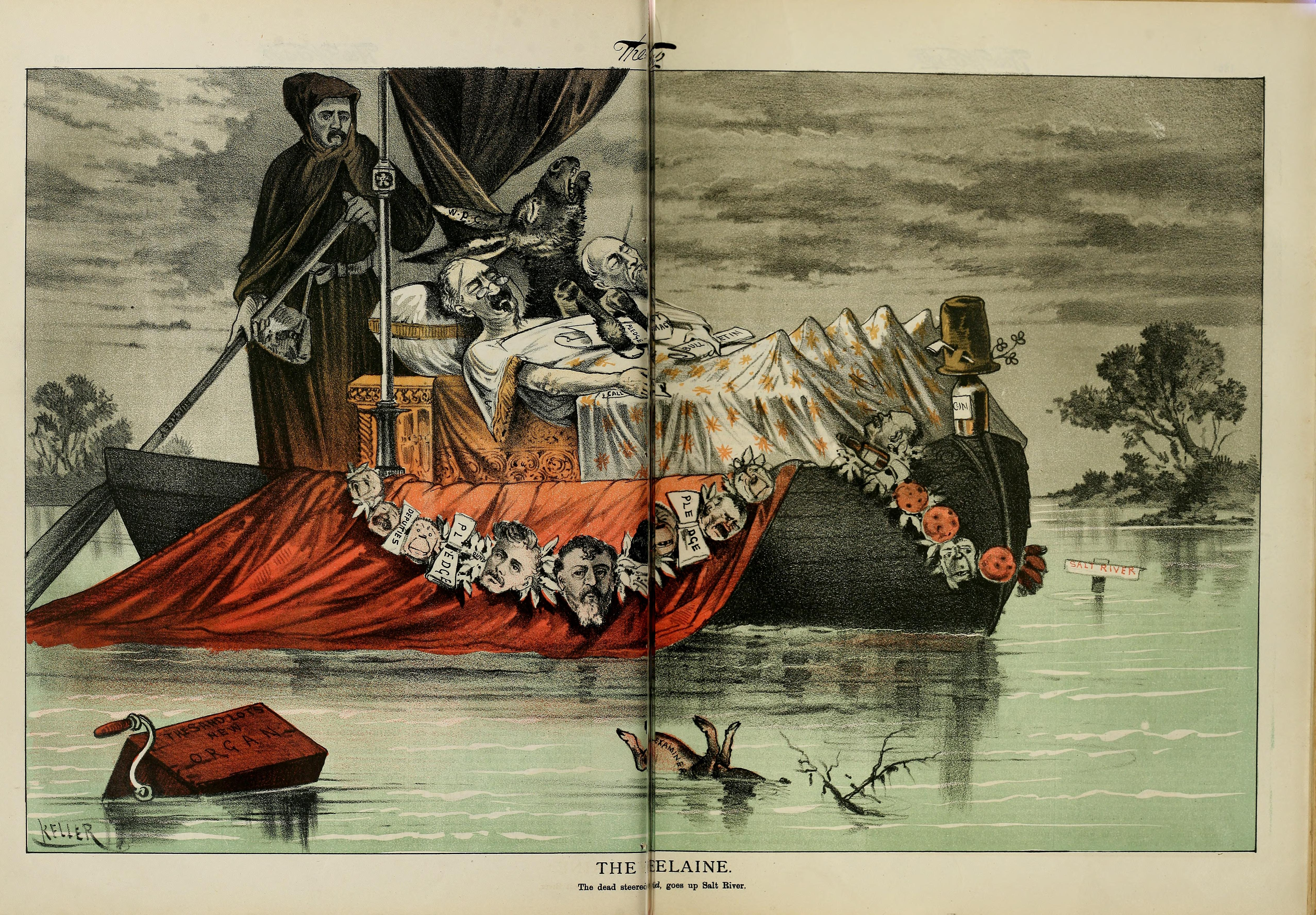
"The Elaine"

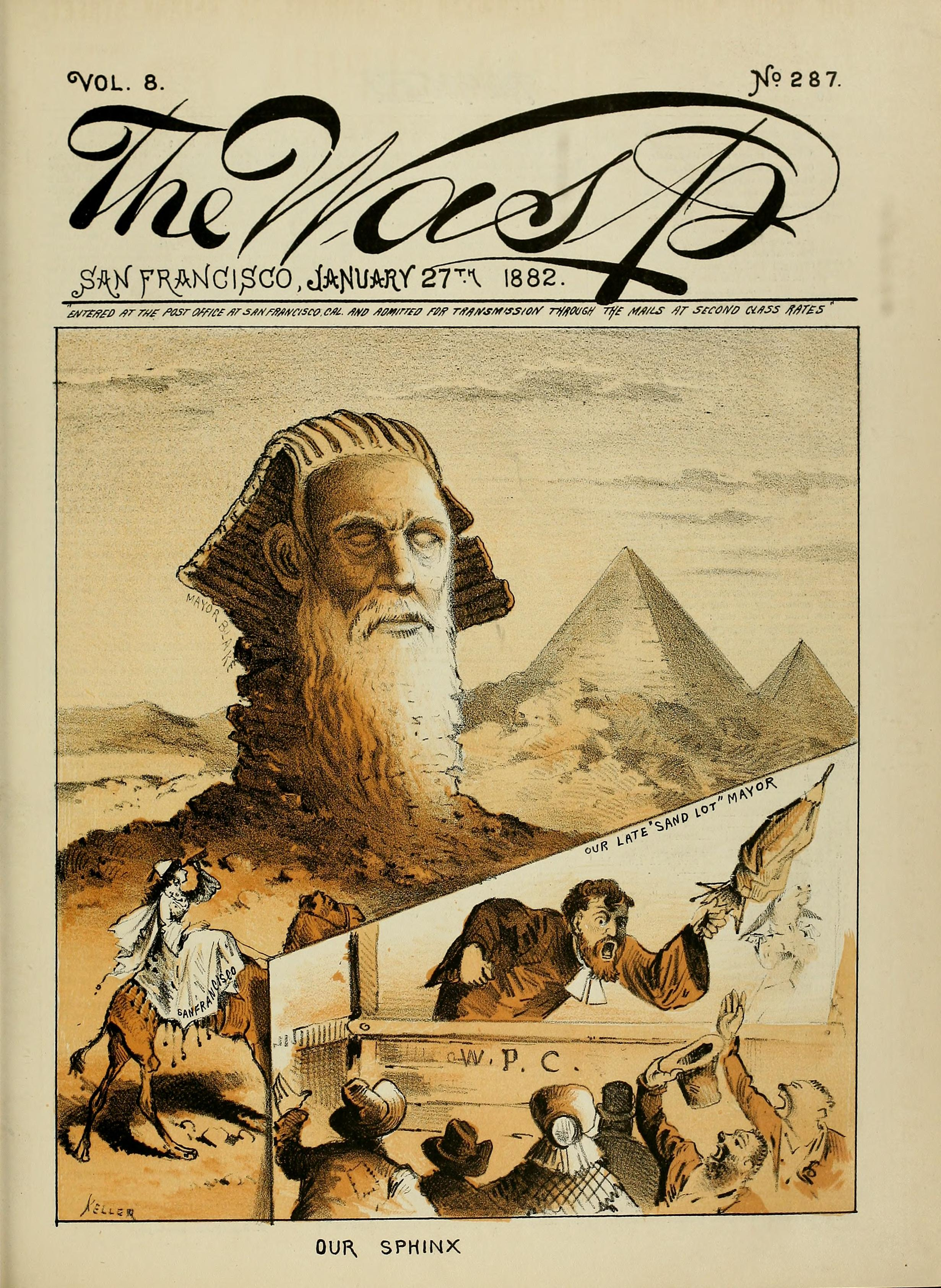
"Our Sphinx"
