= St. Helena Public Cemetery =

Historic site in Napa County, California

- U.S. National Register of Historic Places
- Location within California
- Location: 2461 Spring St., St. Helena, California
- Coordinates: 38°29′36″N 122°28′34″W
- NRHP reference No.: 100002994
- Added to NRHP: October 1, 2018

The St. Helena Public Cemetery, at 2461 Spring St. in St. Helena, California, was listed on the National Register of Historic Places in 2018.

It is about one mile west of downtown St. Helena. It was established in 1856 by the Hudson family as a private burial ground, with the burial of Sarah Hudson. It has been expanded since, including by acquisition of land in 1973, and continues as a public cemetery in 2018.
