= Prerogative =

Exclusive right bestowed by a government or state

In law, a prerogative is an exclusive right bestowed by a government or state and invested in an individual or group, the content of which is separate from the body of rights enjoyed under the general law. It was a common facet of feudal law. The word is derived from Old French prerogative (14c.), M.L. prerogativa "special right", from Latin praerogativa "prerogative, previous choice or election", originally (with tribus, centuria) "100 voters who by lot voted first in the Roman comitia", from praerogativus (adj.) "chosen to vote first".

== Topics ==
- Extraterritoriality
- Prerogative court
- Prerogative writ
- Royal prerogative

== See also ==
- Individual rights
- Sui juris
- "My Prerogative" (song)
