= George Frederick Keller =

American cartoonist (1846–?)

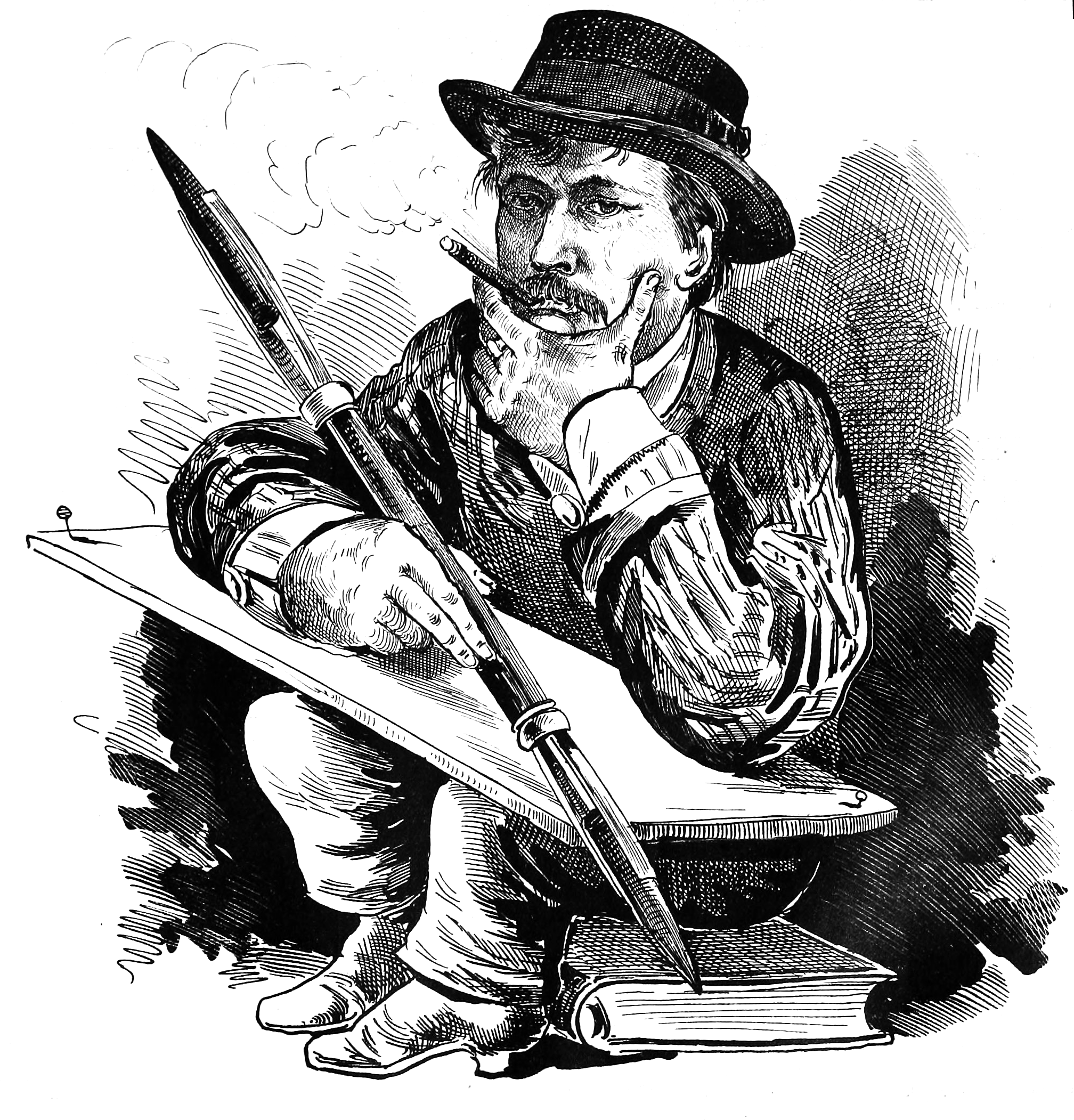
- Self-caricature, 1878
- Born: 1846; Prussia
- Died: after 1883
- Known for: Cartooning
- Notable work: The Wasp

George Frederick Keller (1846–?) was a cartoonist active in California, known as the primary illustrator of the San Francisco satirical magazine The Wasp.

== Biography ==
Born in Prussia, Keller immigrated to the United States and fought in the Civil War, settling in California around 1870. He apprenticed under lithographer George Baker, where his first job was lithographing colorful cigar box labels. He joined The Wasp, also founded by Prussian immigrants, with its first issue debuting in August 1876. Some of his work reflected the anti-Chinese and anti-immigrant sentiment of late 19th-century San Francisco in highly racialized stereotypes, depicting Chinese as rat-like invaders, Irish as Neanderthals, and Jews as hook-nosed moneylenders. Keller's final cartoon was published June 30, 1883, after which he left the San Francisco area "and was never heard from again."

== Gallery ==
Self-caricature, 1878

Self-caricature, 1878

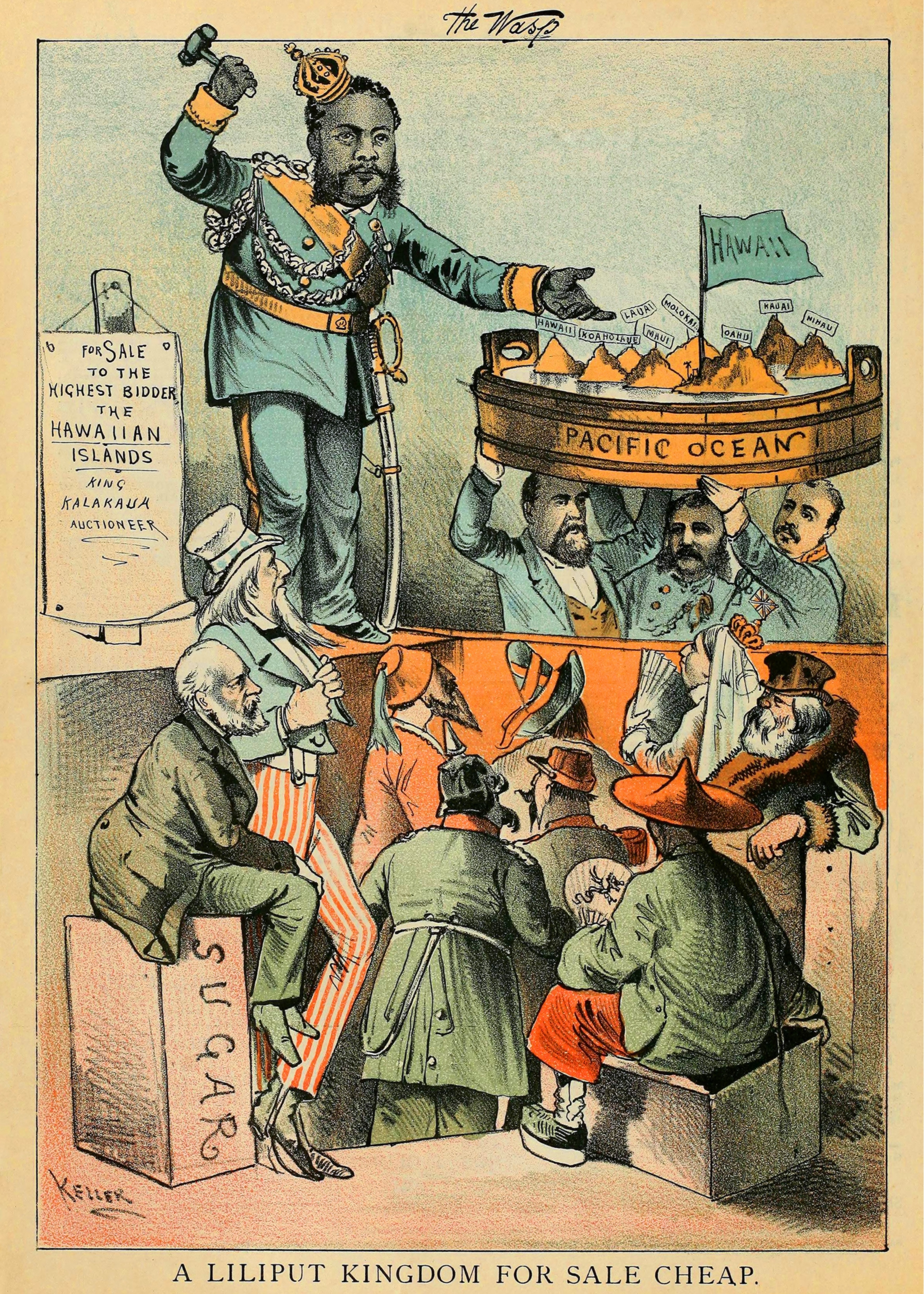
"A Liliput Kingdom For Sale Cheap" (1881), depicts King Kalākaua auctioning the Hawaiian Islands off to the highest bidder

"A Statue for Our Harbor" (1881), depicts the Statue of Liberty in the San Francisco Bay, with a caricatured Chinese worker in place of Lady Liberty

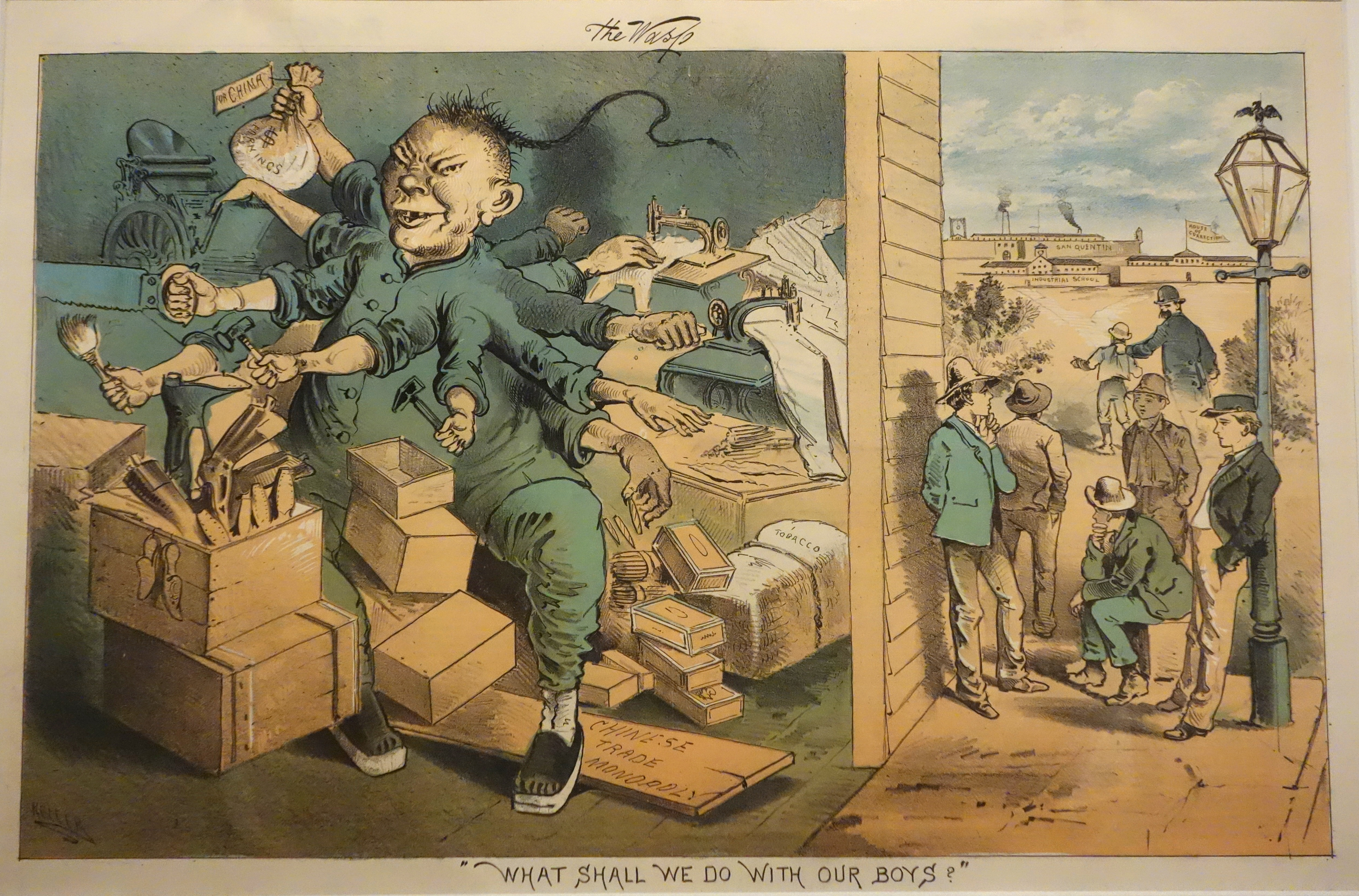
"What Shall We Do with Our Boys?" (1882) portrays a stereotypical Chinese worker as contributing to white American unemployment

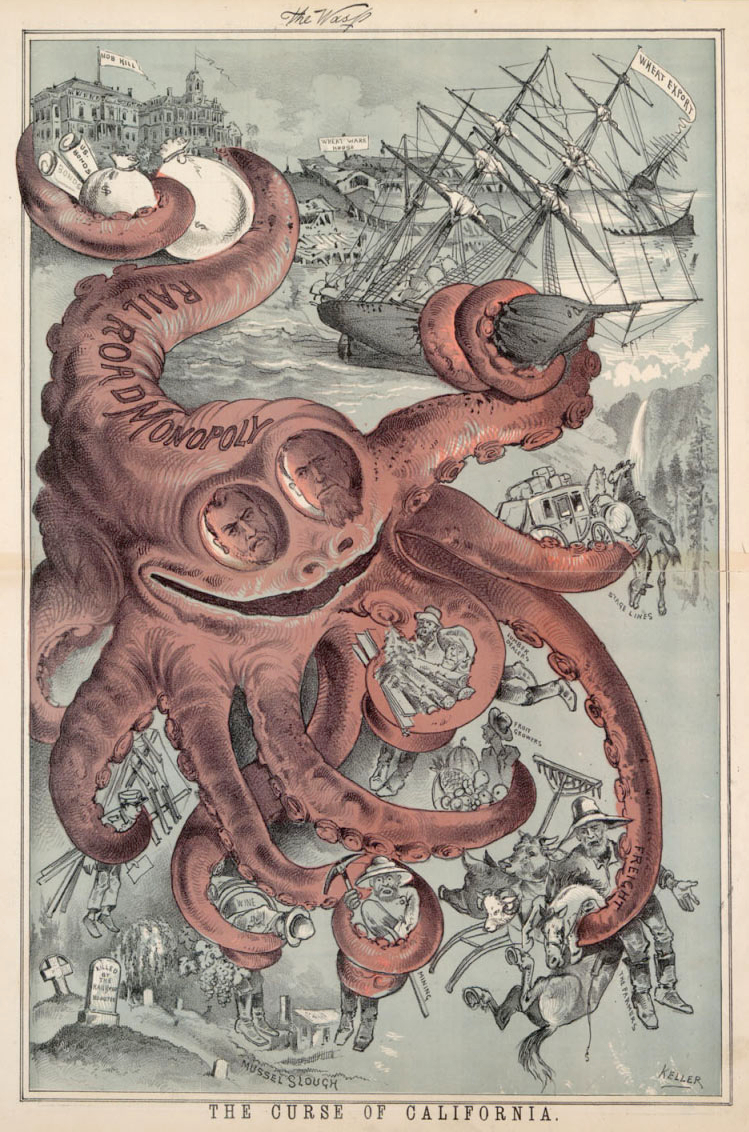
"The Curse of California" (1882) depicts the Southern Pacific Railroad monopoly as an octopus controlling a variety of industries
