= The Wasp (magazine) =

Magazine published in San Francisco

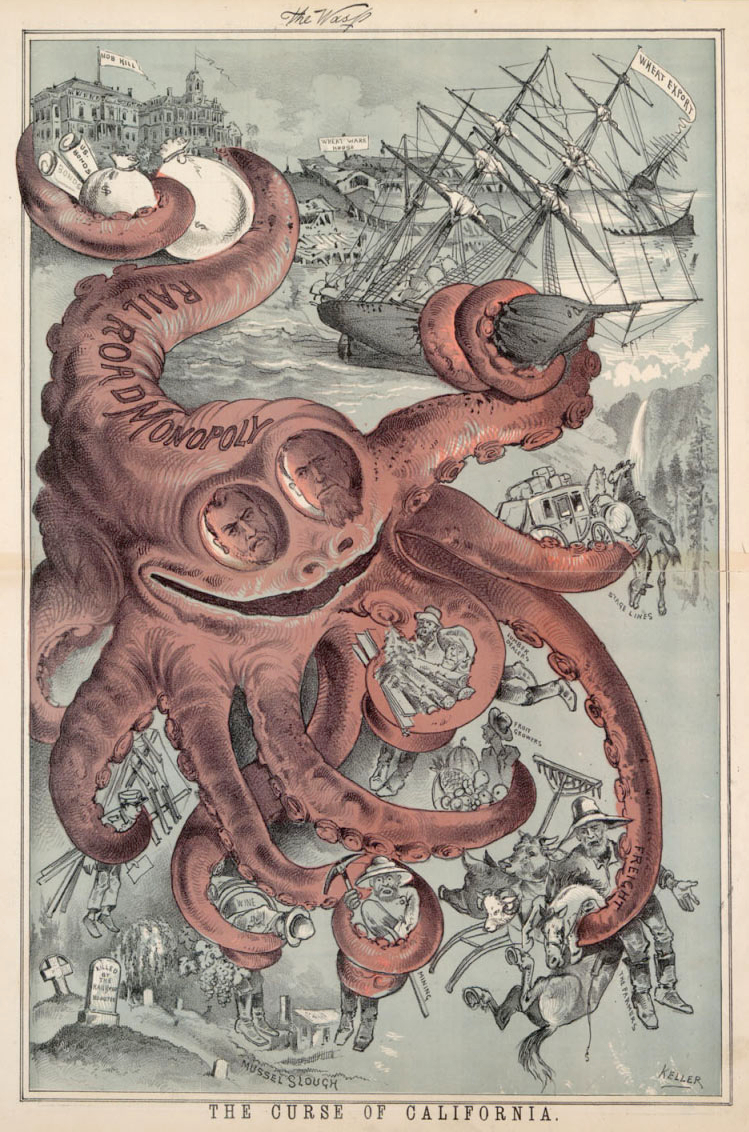
Railroad monopoly cartoon from The Wasp, 1882

The Wasp, also known as The Illustrated Wasp, The San Francisco Illustrated Wasp, The Wasp News-Letter and the San Francisco News- Letter Wasp, was an American weekly satirical magazine based in San Francisco. Founded in 1876, it closed in 1941, the name of the magazine having been changed several times in the interim.

== Background ==
The Wasp was founded as a weekly satire magazine in San Francisco in 1876 by the Bohemian expatriate Francis Korbel and his two brothers, who also founded the Korbel Champagne Cellars. The first issue was published on August 5, 1876. The lead artist until 1883 was George Frederick Keller. The magazine was somewhat unusual at the time, owing to the Korbels' expertise in mass-producing color lithographs in print, a process they had come to master in their first business, the manufacture of labeled cigar boxes. The magazine was sold in secret in 1881 to Charles Webb Howard, who hired Edward C. Macfarlane as publisher. Ambrose Bierce was hired as editor soon afterward, serving in that role from January 1, 1881, until September 11, 1885. During Bierce's editorial tenure, The Wasp published his column "Prattle" and several serialized installments of his satirical definitions later collected as The Devil's Dictionary.

Political cartoons from The Wasp are often cited in Asian-American anti-defamation materials as an example of early stereotyping of Chinese immigrants.

== Name ==
With the following name changes, the magazine ran from August 5, 1876, to April 25, 1941:

- The Wasp, August 5, 1876 – January 20, 1877.
- The Illustrated Wasp, January 27 – September 22, 1877.
- The San Francisco Illustrated Wasp, September 29, 1877 – 1 December 1, 1880.
- The Wasp, December 17, 1880 – October 5, 1895.
- The Wasp: The Illustrated Weekly of the Pacific Coast, October 12, 1895 – April 3, 1897.
- The Wasp: A Journal of Illustration and Comment, April 10, 1897 – August 25, 1928.
- The Wasp News-Letter: A weekly Journal of Illustration and Comment, September 1, 1928 – July 27, 1935.
- San Francisco News- Letter Wasp, August 3, 1935 – April 25, 1941.

== Staff ==
=== Owners ===
- Francis Korbel
- Charles Webb Howard
- Samuel W. Backus

=== Publishers ===
- Edward C. Macfarlane

=== Editors ===
- Ambrose Bierce

=== Artists ===
- George Frederick Keller
- Charles W. Saalburg
- Walt Kuhn

== Cartoons from The Wasp ==
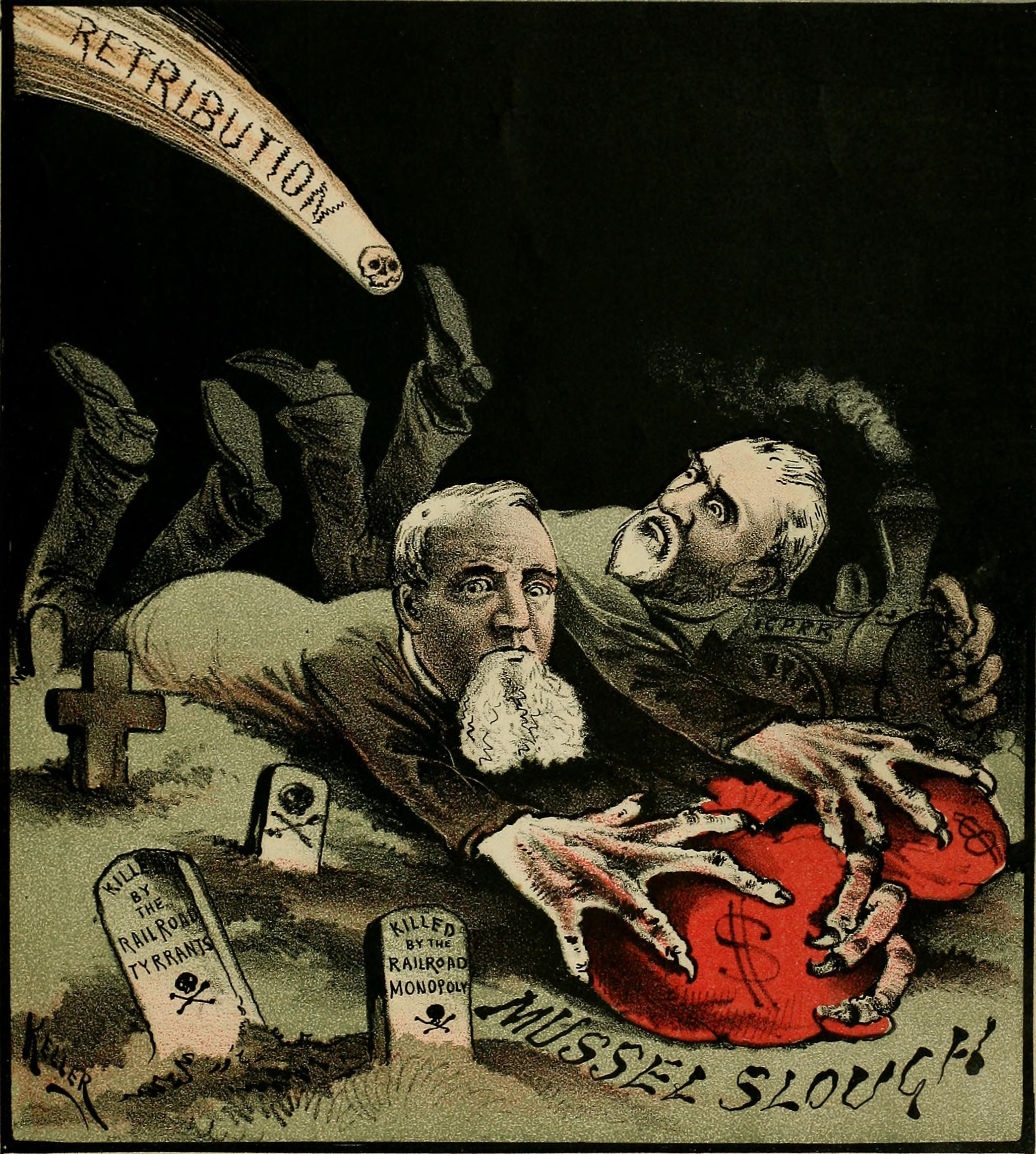
Railroad tycoons Charles Crocker and Leland Stanford robbing victims in the Mussel Slough Tragedy (1881)

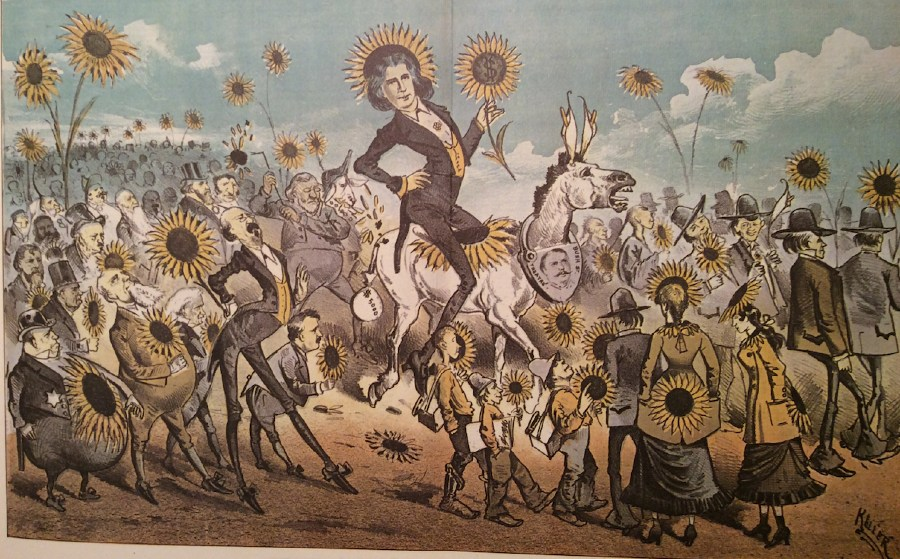
Oscar Wilde's San Francisco visit (1882)

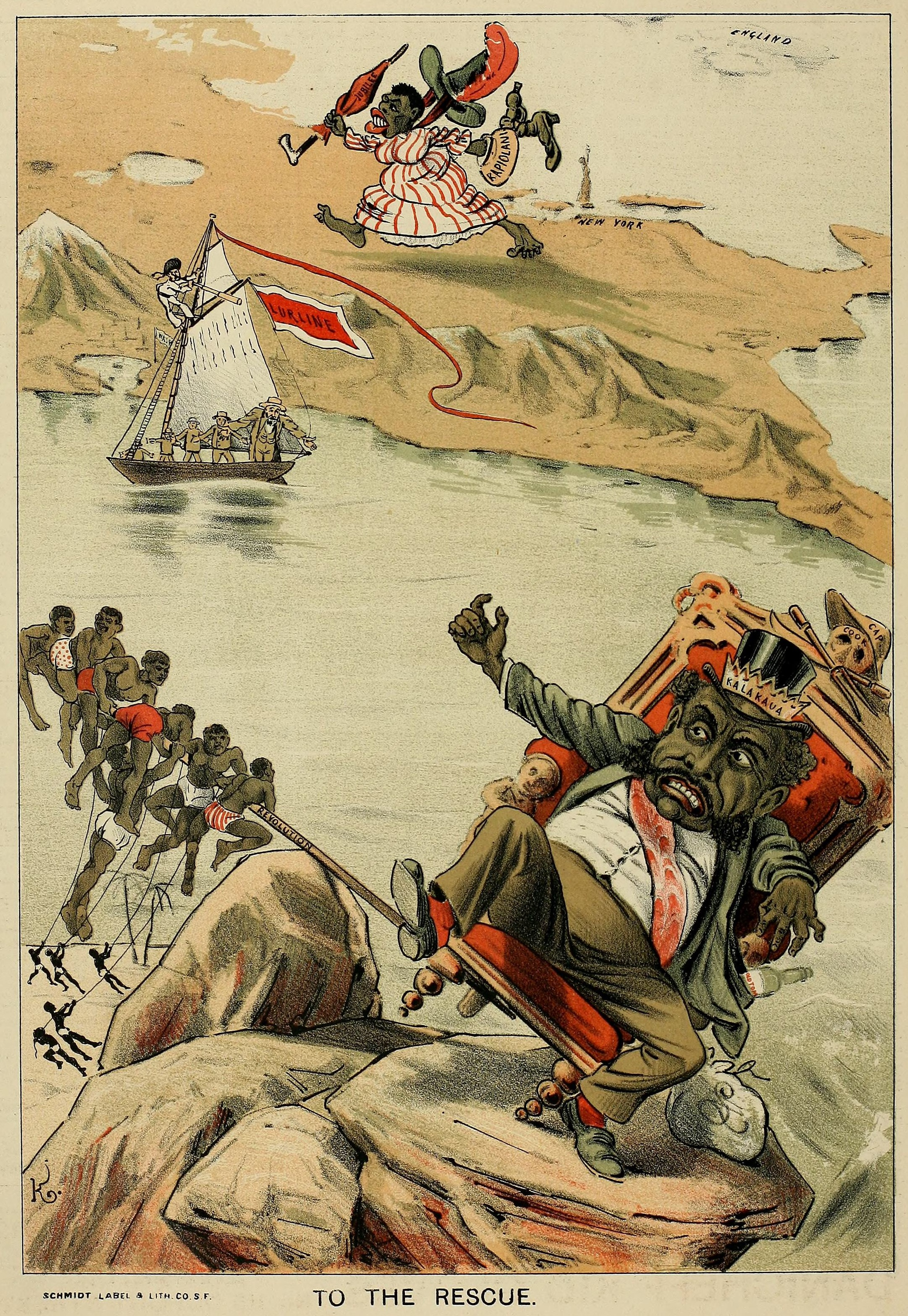
Hawaiian Bayonet Constitution cartoon showing King Kalakaua being toppled (1887)

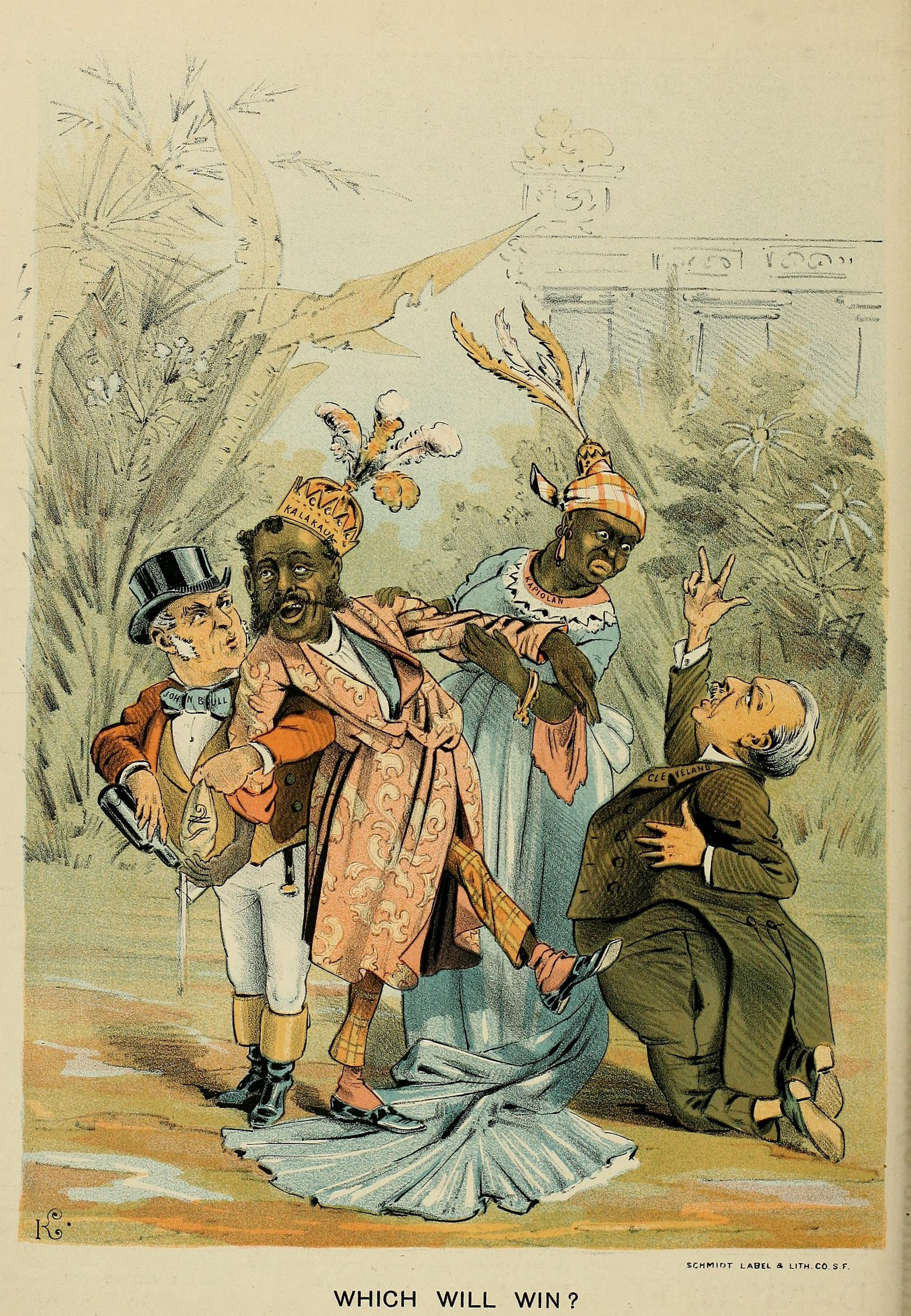
Kalakaua, Kapiolani, Grover Cleveland, and John Bull battle for power in Hawaii (1887)

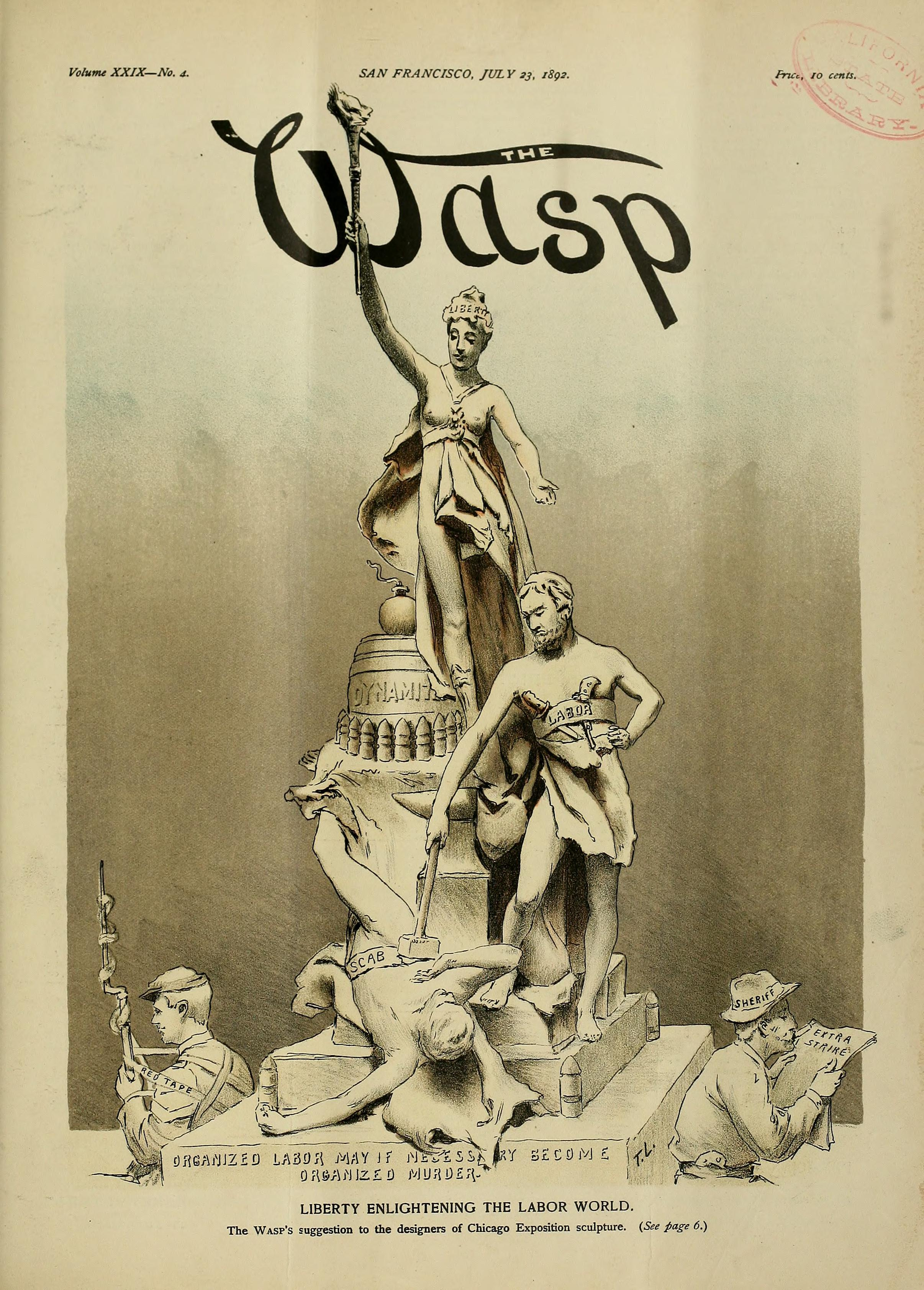
Organized labor is portrayed as murderers (1892)

== Sources ==
- West, Richard Samuel (2004). The San Francisco Wasp: An Illustrated History. Easthampton, Massachusetts: Periodyssey Press. ISBN 978-0971849440.
