= List of Parsons School of Design people =

This is a list of notable alumni and faculty of Parsons School of Design in New York City.

== Notable alumni ==
=== Business ===
- Tyler Haney, founder of Outdoor Voices

=== Design and Technology (MFA) ===
- Zachary Lieberman, new media artist, computer programmer
- Evan Roth, artist and hacker
- Sara Little Turnbull, industrial designer

=== Fashion (BFA) ===
- Gilbert Adrian (1903–1959), costume designer
- Princess Angela of Liechtenstein (born 1958), previously known as Angela Gisela Brown, Panamanian-American fashion designer and the wife of Prince Maximilian of Liechtenstein
- Jeff Banks (born 1943), designer of clothing, jewelry, and home furnishings
- Bill Blass (1922–2002), fashion designer
- Donald Brooks
- Doo-Ri Chung
- Feroze
- Lazaro Hernandez
- Michael Halpern, fashion designer
- Marc Jacobs
- Elois Jenssen
- Kevin Johnn
- Donna Karan
- Derek Lam
- Jillian Lewis
- Sandy Liang
- Parke Lutter
- Jenna Lyons
- Princess Marie-Caroline of Liechtenstein
- Claire McCardell
- Raul Melgoza
- Isaac Mizrahi (born 1961), fashion designer and television presenter
- Thakoon Panichgul
- Sarah Phillips
- Claudia Poh
- Patrick Robinson
- Narciso Rodriguez
- Lela Rose
- Behnaz Sarafpour
- Dmitry Sholokhov
- Steinunn Sigurdardottir
- Willi Smith
- Peter Som
- Anna Sui
- Alfred Sung
- Kay Unger, fashion designer
- Carmen Marc Valvo
- Alexander Wang
- John Warden
- Jason Wu

=== Fashion (AAS) ===
- Prabal Gurung
- Reed Krakoff
- Miles Redd
- Bradford Shellhammer

=== Film (BFA) ===
- Sarah Austin
- Harry Hurwitz
- Adam Jasinski
- Charis Michelsen
- Joel Schumacher
- Rob Zombie, born as Robert Cummings

=== Fine Art (BFA or MFA) ===
- Kevin Appel
- Rosemary Cove
- Roya Farassat
- Jane Frank
- Charles Goldman
- Adolph Gottlieb
- Julie Harvey
- Edward Hopper
- D Hwang
- Steffani Jemison
- Jasper Johns
- Mitchell Johnson
- Shirley Kaneda
- Sol Kjok
- Dimitar Lukanov
- Rob Pruitt
- Andrew Cornell Robinson
- Norman Rockwell
- Anrika Rupp
- Gavin Spielman
- Emily Sundblad
- Rodel Tapaya
- Julie Umerle
- Nick van Woert
- Ai Weiwei
- Betsy Wolfston
- Janise Yntema

=== Visual Communication and Graphic Design (BFA or BBA) ===
- Brian Biggs
- Hector Luis Bustamante
- Kelly Chen
- Bea Feitler
- Jenny Mannerheim
- Ryan McGinley
- Paul Rand
- Mimi So

=== Illustration (BFA) ===
- Louisa Bertman
- Ilse Bischoff
- Peter DeSeve
- Leo and Diane Dillon
- Julia Gran
- Bessie Pease Gutmann
- Hidekaz Himaruya
- Bob Rafei
- Joel Resnicoff (1948–1986), artist and fashion illustrator
- Brian Wood
- Dan Yaccarino

=== Music (MS) ===
- Melora Creager
- Roman Turovsky-Savchuk
- Jimmy Urine
- Sean Yseult

=== Photography (BFA) ===
- Ransom Ashley
- Pamella Bordes
- Philippe Cramer
- Amina Cruz
- Olivia Galli
- Bella Hadid
- Hidekaz Himaruya
- Sun Lee
- Danielle Mckinney (MFA)
- Steven Meisel (born 1954), fashion photographer
- Herbert Muschamp
- Stewart Shining

=== Uncategorized ===
- Amy Astley
- Emman Atienza, attended Parsons Summer Academy for an intensive design course
- Hlynur Atlason
- Melitta Baumeister (born 1986), German fashion designer (MFA Fashion Design and Society, 2013)
- Henry Rutgers Beekman
- Siri Berg, faculty
- Dean and Dan Caten
- Richard Chai
- C.K. Chatterton, studied in the New York School of Art, 1900–1904
- Rose Connor
- Jasper Conran
- Dorian Corey
- Sue de Beer
- Deepti Divakar - Indian model, actress, writer and Femina Miss India World 1981
- Stephen Dwoskin
- Monir Shahroudy Farmanfarmaian
- Tom Ford
- Charles Gagnon
- William Gropper
- Clyde Kenneth Harris
- Auriea Harvey
- David Horvath
- Chet Kalm, former administrator; established the Foundation Department
- Sun-Min Kim
- Sean Kinney
- Chang-Jin Lee
- Ji Lee
- Dorothy Marckwald
- Princess Maria-Olympia of Greece and Denmark
- Brian McCarty
- Burton Miller (1926–1982), Academy Award-nominated costume designer
- Tom Morrow
- Kimberly Ovitz (born 1983), fashion designer
- Rick Owens
- Ingibjörg Stefanía Pálmadóttir
- Thakoon Panichgul
- Heron Preston
- Kalyani Priyadarshan
- Rob Pruitt
- Raghavendra Rathore
- Miguel Robles-Durán
- Ednah Root
- Julia Restoin Roitfeld (born 1980), French creative director and designer
- Stefan Sagmeister
- Arleen Schloss
- Proenza Schouler
- Carl Sprinchorn
- Yuval Tal
- Paula Mary Turnbull
- Alexandra von Fürstenberg (née Alexandra Natasha Miller; born 1972), Hong Kong-born American furniture designer

== Notable faculty ==
- Ruth Abrams, painter and faculty in the 1960s
- Janet Fish, painter
- Tim Gunn, fashion design faculty 1982–2007; department chair 2000–2007
- Herschel Levit, photography faculty 1977–1986
- Mary Ann Scherr, founding chair of the Product Design Department 1979–1989
