= Qee =

Series of designer toys

Qee (pronounced "key") are a collection of designer toys created by Hong Kong-based company Toy2R in 2001, which was founded by Raymond Choy in 1995.

== Figure ==
Qee figures vary in their design. The original Qee has a body that resembles an extremely simplified human form, somewhat similar in appearance to Playmobil or LEGO figures, though distinctively round and squat. Depending on its theme, a figure may have the head of a bear with asymmetrical ears called a BearBearQ; a cat called KitCatQ; a dog called DoggyQ; a monkey called MonQ; or a rabbit called Bunee. The Toyer Qee has the same body type as the original, but a head that resembles a cartoon skull. The Knuckle Bear Qee was created by Japanese character designer Touma, and resembles a graffiti-style caricature of an anthropomorphized bear. The Qee Egg simply resembles an anthropomorphized egg. All of Qee figures are designed by renowned designers/artists from across the globe. They are available in various sizes that include the 1.5", 2.5”, 8”, 16”, 36” and the 60” Qee. Toy2r also provides D.I.Y (Do It Yourself) Qees for aspiring designers/artists who wish to use Qee as a 3D canvas to express their own original work as, Qee allows for self-expression and creativity through a unique format.

== Production and design ==
Qees are produced in limited numbers and are highly collectible; they are predominantly collected by adults. Many contemporary artists and designers from Asia, Australia, Europe, North America, and South America have designed figures. Typically, designing a Qee figure means creating a design scheme, or deco, for one of the aforementioned molds.

The casual observer may note similarities between Qees and the Kubrick and Be@rbrick figures created by Japanese toy company MediCom. However, closer observation reveals that Qees differ not only in size, but in their overall aesthetic. Relative to MediCom, Toy2R releases very few licensed designs, such as figures based on characters from films, comic books, or other intellectual properties. Exceptions to this are Qees created for Adidas, Benetton, BenQ, BMW, Christian Lacroix, Dark Horse Comics, Devo, DKNY, Mitsubishi, MTV, Nokia, SanDisk, Samsung, Sony, Starbucks, Swatch, Target, V.S.O.P. and Xbox 360, as well as a figure created in conjunction with tokidoki for LeSportsac, in which the figure is a design element of a women's travel bag.

There are currently five series of Qees, and an anticipated total of 1500 2.5" figures.

== Contributing artists ==
- Sasha Huber Shy
- Gary Baseman
- Tim Biskup
- Coop
- Phil Corbett
- Dalek (artist)
- Voltaire
- Doink Design
- Shepard Fairey
- Doze Green
- Jaime Hayon
- Tom Hazelmyer
- David Horvath
- Nathan Jurevicius
- Sun-Min Kim
- Frank Kozik
- Joe Ledbetter
- Mark Mothersbaugh
- Mad Barbarians
- Rolito
- RUN
- Mimic
- Jason Freeny
