= Brian McCarty =

American photographer

- Born: July 22, 1974 (age 52) Memphis, Tennessee
- Area: Photographer

Brian McCarty (born July 22, 1974) is a contemporary artist and photographer known for his work with toys. McCarty's approach is based upon integrating toy characters into real-life situations through the use of forced perspective in carefully crafted scenes. Preferring to work in-camera and without compositing, McCarty creates his photographs by sometimes traveling to exotic locations, including active war zones. Although grounded in reality, because of his use of wit and whimsy, McCarty's work is often associated with the Art-Toy, Lowbrow, and Pop Surrealist movements.

== Education ==
McCarty attended Parsons School of Design (1992–1996) and earned a BFA in photography. While at Parsons in 1993, he began work on a photographic series titled The Dollhouse. For the series McCarty constructed a toy hyperreality and used the simulacra of family to explore modern living. The Dollhouse received notable praise – earning a spot in the traveling exhibition Making It Real, curated by Vik Muniz.

== Career ==
=== Fabrica ===
Upon graduation from Parsons in 1996, McCarty accepted a grant to the Benetton supported Fabrica research centre in Treviso, Italy. While there he collaborated with an international group of young artists on a number of advertising campaigns and fine art exhibitions, including Habitus, Abito, Abitare, Progetto Arte at the Luigi Pecci Centre for Contemporary Art and KONEPT, the first major photographic exhibition in Zagreb after the Croatian war of independence.

=== Mattel ===
McCarty worked as an in-house photographer for Mattel Toys (1999–2002), primarily on the Hot wheels brand of toys.

=== Art toys ===
In 2003 McCarty founded the photo studio McCarty PhotoWorks in West Hollywood, California. Through the studio, McCarty created collaborative work with a number of well-known artists from the Art-Toy and Pop Surrealist movements, including Mark Ryden, Gary Baseman, Tim Biskup, Joe Ledbetter, Amanda Visell, Michelle Valigura, Greg "Craola" Simkins, FriendsWithYou, Andrew Bell, Jeremy Fish, Luke Chueh, Mario "MARS-1" Martinez, Scott Tolleson, Simone Legno, and Yoskay Yamamoto. A collection of McCarty's Art-Toy collaborations was published as a monograph in 2010 by Baby Tattoo Books in Los Angeles.

=== War-Toys ===
McCarty began the War-Toys photo series and documentary film in 2010. The project uses principles of play therapy and art therapy to explore children's firsthand accounts of war. McCarty completed his first trip to the Middle East in 2011, collaborating with children from the Spafford Children's Center in East Jerusalem and the Dheisheh Refugee Camp outside of Bethlehem. He returned to the region in late 2012 and collaborated with Palestinian children in the Gaza Strip during the escalation leading up to Operation Pillar of Defense, then with Israeli children in the nearby town of Sderot beginning on the morning of the ceasefire. McCarty has announced his intention to expand the project into additional areas on conflict around the world, including Sudan, Afghanistan, and Colombia.

== Selected exhibitions ==
- "Juger/Créer: Regards sur la Cour Pénale Internationale," Cité internationale des arts, Paris, France (2018)
- "War is Only Half the Story: Ten Years of the Aftermath Project," PhotoVille, Brooklyn, NY (2017)
- "-Métamorphoses," L'Université de Franche-Comté, Besançon, France (2017)
- "Turn the Page: The First Ten Years of Hi-Fructose," Virginia Museum of Contemporary Art, Virginia Beach, VA (2016)
- "War Games," V&A Museum of Childhood, London, England (2013)
- "War Games," Volksmuseum Schleswig, Schleswig, Germany (2012)
- "WAR-TOYS," Richard F. Brush Art Gallery, St. Lawrence University, Canton, NY (2012)
- "Freedom to Create," The Company's Gardens, Cape Town, South Africa (2011)
- "Art-Toys," La Luz de Jesus Gallery, Los Angeles, California (2010)
- "Under the Influence: He Man and the Masters of the Universe,” Gallery 1988, Los Angeles, California (2010)
- “MANIFEST HOPE: DC,” Irvine Contemporary Gallery, Washington, D.C. (2009)
- “Three Apples,” Royal/T, Culver City, California (2009)
- “Hi Fructose Group Art Show,” CoproNason Gallery, Santa Monica, California (2008)
- “Beyond Ultraman,” Pasadena Museum of California Art, Pasadena, California (2007)
- “i am 8-bit,” Gallery 1988, Los Angeles, California (2007)
- “Toys: New Designs From the Art Toy Revolution,” The Showroom NYC (2006)
- “Curious Creatures,” Punch Gallery, San Francisco, California (2004)
- “Making it Real,” Portland Museum of Art, Portland, Maine (1998)
- “Making it Real,” Bayly Art Museum, University of Virginia, Charlottesville, VA (1998)
- “Making it Real,” Bakalar Gallery, Massachusetts College of Art, Boston, MA (1998)
- “Making it Real,” Aldrich Contemporary Art Museum, Ridgefield, Connecticut (1997)
- “Making it Real,” The Reykjavik Municipal Art Museum, Reykjavik, Iceland (1997)
- “paura®,” the Luigi Pecci Centre for Contemporary Art in Prato, Italy (1996)

== Bibliography ==
- War-Toys: Israel, West Bank, Gaza Strip, McCarty, Brian. Los Angeles. McCarty PhotoWorks, 2013 (ISBN 978-0615836584)
- Art-Toys: Photographs by Brian McCarty, McCarty, Brian. Los Angeles. Baby Tattoo Books, 2010 (ISBN 978-0979330766)
- Hi-fructose Collected Edition, Owens, Annie. San Francisco. Last Gasp, 2009 (ISBN 978-0867197136)
- Beyond Ultraman, Kwong, Maria, and Pasadena Museum of California Art, ed. Los Angeles. Baby Tattoo Books, 2007 (ISBN 978-0979330728)
- Dot Dot Dash, Klanten, Robert, and Hubner, Matthias, ed. Berlin. Die Gestalten Verlag, 2006 (ISBN 978-3899551617)
- Toys: New Designs From the Art Toy Revolution, STRANGEco, ed. New York. MTV/Universe Publishing, 2006 (ISBN 978-0789313904)
- Vinyl Will Kill, IdN and Jeremyville, ed. Hong Kong. IdN, 2004(ISBN 978-9889706500)
