= Cherry Capri =

- Occupations: Artist, author, singer, chef
- Years active: 2002–present
- Known for: Pasadena Doo Dah Parade
- Website: cherrycapri.com

Cherry Capri is an American pop-culture figure, author and performance artist whose work explores Mid Century Modern style, healthy homemaking, and manners. She has been called "a mix between Martha Stewart and Pee Wee Herman." She has also been called "America's Mistress of Modernism, Manners & Mirth."

== Biography ==
=== Performance career ===
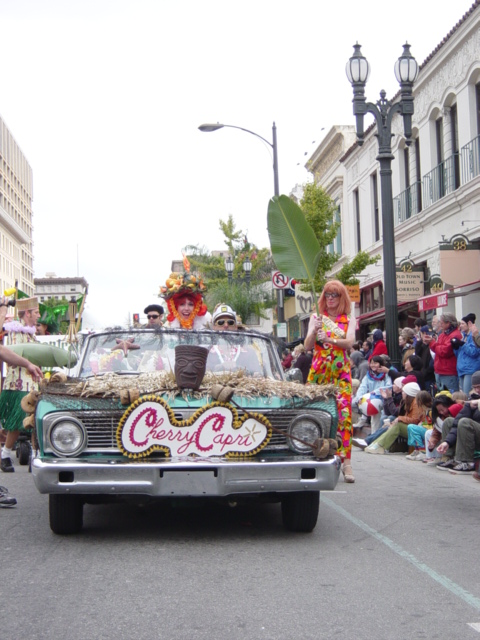
Cherry Capri, Queen of the 2004 Pasadena Doo Dah Parade

As a performer, Capri has headlined three Mondo Lounge weekenders and the Mondo Tiki event at the Las Vegas Hard Rock Hotel. She has sung at Tiki Oasis and tiki clubs across the country. In 2005, she was a featured performer in the cult classic movie by Tony Marsico, Camp Burlesque. Capri has made appearances on television talk shows including The Tonight Show with Jay Leno.

In 2006 she was featured on the full-length album Creamy Cocktails & Other Delights with a cover that paid a homage to the album cover of Whipped Cream & Other Delights by Herb Alpert's Tijuana Brass. Her title song from this album was included as the main anthem in the same-sex marriage rights movie, I Want to Get Married.

In 2007, she was approached to star in a MidMod home-improvement lifestyle show called Lotta Living, based on the website of the same name. The series ultimately failed to progress past development stages.

In 2016 she was considered for a children's television show reprising a Fred Rogers-style lead in an updated version of Mr. Roger's Neighborhood.

Over the years, Capri has supported various charitable organizations through performances and appearances, including the Los Angeles Conservancy Modern Committee, Palm Springs Modern Committee and Lightbringer Project. In 2004, she was crowned the queen of the Pasadena Doo Dah Parade.

=== Fine art career ===
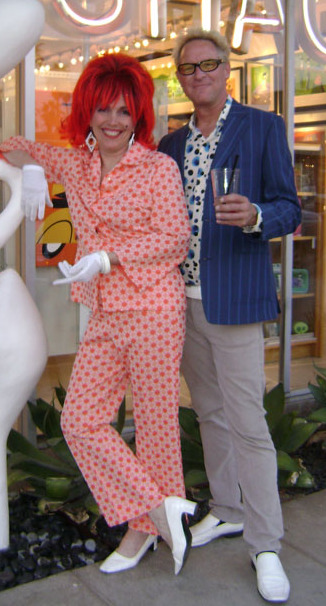
Sculpture by Cherry Capri in front of SHAG store in Palm Springs, CA, posing with artist Josh Agle

Capri is also a sculptor and painter and has exhibited in Hollywood, Las Vegas, Palm Springs and San Francisco in group shows and alongside Shag, Mark Ryden, Tim Biskup and other artists of the Southern California Pop Surrealist scene. Capri's artwork brings an appreciation for matchbook artwork, like Andy Warhol provided recognition for packaging (soup cans) in the 1960s. Her work also serves explicitly to excite viewers about the preservation of Mid-Century Modern architecture and signage. Her work was featured in the first seminal Tiki Art Now - Volume One book by Otto von Stroheim, and can be seen in the background of the movie Kiss Kiss Bang Bang.

She had a one-woman show, "Come for Sun Swim Fun," at M Modern Gallery, featuring the work of classic Palm Springs establishments such as the Caliente Tropics motel and the now demolished Palm Springs Spa Hotel. Her one-woman show "Sparkles in Quick Sand" in Studio City featured works inspired by-gone iconic Las Vegas hotels such as the Dunes Hotel and Casino and the Sands Hotel.

Her artwork is in the collections of casino magnate Steve Wynn, as well as the late greats, Merv Griffin and Huell Howser. Her sculpture was featured at the SHAG Store for the 2012 Palm Springs Modernism Weekend.

=== Author and "Dear Cherry" advice column ===
In 2015, Capri released he first retro raw food recipe book, Eat Like Eve – Irresistible Recipes for Nude Food. The interior pages were inspired by the vintage Culinary Arts Academy cookbooks from the 1950s, and include a few recipes from her "Dear Cherry" advice column.

Capri is best known for her critically acclaimed "Dear Cherry" retro Dear Abby-style advice columns, which have appeared in CA-Modern Magazine since 2005, in addition to columns in Tiki Magazine and Bachelor Pad Magazine. Her writing combines historical references with updated healthy living tips and advice for today's world.

Her recent Dear Cherry interstitial radio show for Public Radio Exchange, loosely based on her print columns and co-produced by Mary-Margaret Stratton, Cary Stratton, and Jason Croft aka 'Java', has been picked up as far away as Australia.

== Bibliography ==
- Tiki Art Now!: A Volcanic Eruption of Art. Last Gasp. 2004. ISBN 0-86719-627-0.
- Eat Like Eve. Futura House. 2015. ISBN 978-0-9965835-0-3.
- Eat Like Eve Special Audible Edition with music by Joe Darro. Futura House. 2015.
- Why Am I?: a little life lesson by Cherry Capri. Futura House. 2018. ISBN 978-0996583527.
- The Wheel of the Year. Futura House. 2018. ISBN 978-0996583596.
- Please Don't Eat My Friends. Futura House. 2018. ISBN 978-0999874929.

== Filmography ==
=== Film ===
- Camp Burlesque (2004)
- I Want to Get Married (2011) – "Creamy Cocktails" (featured singer)

=== Television appearances ===
- Tonight Show (2004)
