= Lukanov =

Lukanov is a surname of Eastern European origin. Notable people with the surname include:

- Andrey Lukanov (1938–1996), Bulgarian politician
- Dimitar Lukanov (born 1969), Bulgarian-American artist
- Dmytro Lukanov (born 1995), Ukrainian footballer
- Emanuel Lukanov (born 1975), Bulgarian footballer
- Karlo Lukanov (1897–1982), Bulgarian politician
