= Jason Freeny =

American artist (born 1970)

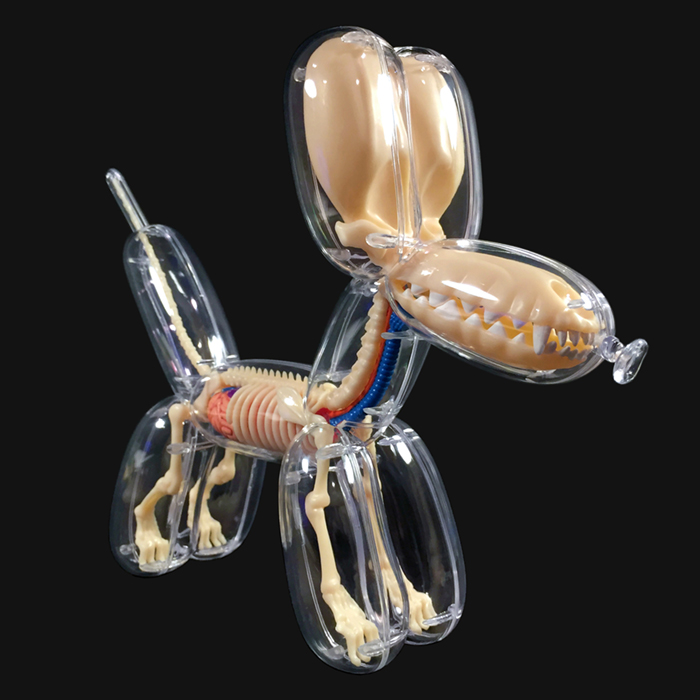
- Balloon Dog anatomical model by Jason Freeny
- Born: July 28, 1970 (age 55); Silver Spring, Maryland, U.S.
- Education: Pratt Institute, School of visual arts
- Known for: Sculptor, designer toys, illustrator
- Notable work: Pneumatic Anatomica (2007); "XXRAY" Designer Toy Series (2015)
- Movement: Pop Surrealism, Designer toy
- Website: jasonfreeny.com

Jason Freeny (born 1970) is an American artist specializing in sculpture, designer toys and computer-generated imagery. He is best known for his anatomical art, where he produces cutaway drawings and sculptures of (typically toy) inanimate objects such as a Lego man, Barbie doll, the animated fish Nemo or a balloon art dog.

== Early life ==
Jason Freeny was born in 1970 in Silver Spring, Maryland, United States, in a creative household. His mother worked creating Go-go dancing wear, and his father, a professor of painting and sculpture at the University of Maryland. He was exposed early on to pop culture, surrealist art, and Saturday-morning cartoon. A tragic incident in 1976, involving Jason's mother being severely burned in a nightclub fire, had a traumatic impact and affected much of Jason's adolescent years.

Freeny attended the Pratt Institute in Brooklyn, New York. where he studied industrial design, a foundation that later informed his prototyping and sculptural techniques.

He attended Middletown High School in Middletown, Maryland.

== Career ==
Freeny worked for MTV as a production designer and property designer, where he created the custom trophies used in the Rock'n'Jock series and TRL Awards televised events. Freeny also spent time at ESPN designing for the mobile phone division and was a freelance illustrator creating editorial and literary illustrations for Penthouse.

In 2006 Freeny began creating his anatomical illustrations, beginning with a computer-generated, transparent, balloon modelling animal infographic, showing internal organs. He transitioned this concept into three-dimensional sculptures, combining his industrial design training with hand-crafted techniques to produce meticulously detailed “cutaway” figures.

Freeny's sculptural and illustration work has been the basis for multiple mass-produced toys. He has collaborated with Hong Kong–based Toy2R (working on the Qee figurines), Hong Kong–based Fame Master toys producing Gummy bear anatomical toys, United States–based Jailbreak Collective producing the "CAPSL" collectable series and United States–based Marbles the Brain Store creating Freeny's Brain Cube puzzle. He has also worked extensively with Singapore-based Mighty Jaxx to produce hundreds of unique toys under the XXRAY, Hidden Dissectables, and Jason Freeny branding, establishing the anatomy character design, and was the driving force behind Mightyjaxx early success, including a series of Sanrio and Minions toy collectibles.

== Critical reception and impact ==
Critics have praised Freeny for transforming the toy paradigm: rather than mass-producing licensed characters, he elevates them to sculptural art with anatomical insight. Critics cite Freeny as one of the most influential artists of the 21st century, within the designer toy genre.

His collaborations, most notably with Singapore-based MightyJaxx, have helped define and expand the designer toy movement, making high-concept art toys accessible to collectors globally. His work has appeared in both fine art and commercial art contexts, bridging disciplines and adding legitimacy to the designer-toy-as-art genre.

== Legacy and influence ==
Over nearly two decades, Jason Freeny has carved out a distinctive niche in contemporary art. By combining anatomical realism (arts) with beloved cultural icons, he has challenged the boundaries between toy design, sculpture, and fine art. His influence can be seen in the broader acceptance of "dissectible" toys, the fusion of biology with pop art, and the growing respect for designer toy creators as legitimate artists.

== Personal life ==
Jason lives and maintains his studio in Long Beach, New York with his fiancée, Kendra. He has two children and is a professor of Toy Production at the School of Visual Arts in New York City.

== Awards ==
Freeny has received several Designer Toy Awards throughout his career, including Break Through Artist (2011), Fan Favorite (2013), Custom of the Year (2014), Best Collaboration with artist Luke Chueh (2014), Artist of the Year – Fan Choice (2014), and Best Vinyl & Plastic (2016).

Freeny was the Designer, Art Director and Typographer for the poster series entitled Anatomy, which was awarded the Grand Prix (Outdoor) and Gold Medal (Print Work) at the 2009 Dubai Lynx International Advertising Festival.

== Exhibitions ==
"Happy Pills" Copro Gallery, Los Angeles, 2023

"Outside In" Hong Kong, 2020

"X-Soul Station" Shanghai, 2019

"Jason Freeny Asia" Taipei, 2019

"Plastic Surgeon" Megumi Ogita Gallery, Tokyo, 2017

"From East to East" London, 2016

"MOLT" La Luz de Jesus, Los Angeles, 2015

PIQ, Piq, Las Vegas, 2013

"Choice Cuts" 101/exhibit, Los Angeles, 2013

== Private collections ==
- Nike CEO/President Mark Parker
- Television Host Conan O'Brien
- Los Angeles collector Long Gone John
- Comedian Hamish Blake
