= Freeney =

Freeney or Freeny is a surname. Notable people with the surname include:

- Dwight Freeney (born 1980), American football defensive end
- Jason Freeny (born 1970), American artist
- Jonathan Freeny (born 1989), American football linebacker
