= Toy2R =

- Founded: 1995
- Founder: Prof. Raymond Choy M.H.
- Headquarters: Hong Kong, People's Republic of China
- Products: Designer toys
- Website: http://www.toy2r.com/

Toy2R (abbreviation of Toy to Raymond) is a designer toy company based in Hong Kong that was founded by Prof. Raymond Choy M.H. in 1995.

== History ==
Raymond Choy spent 10 years as an employee of an American footwear company, developing many useful skills in business. Following his dream of combining his hobby with his career, Choy pursued a business degree and studied design.

Choy opened a toy store in 1995. Four years later, Choy observed a recent trend in collectible toys, now known as designer toys, specifically the urban vinyl movement of toy design. He decided to put all his funds into the development of a vinyl figure, intended more as art than as a toy. He called this figure the Toyer. Toy2R is amongst the first to explore the designer toy phenomenon, combining art and developing vinyl toys for the collectors market.

== Products ==
The Toyer design, which resembles a simplified human form with a head that resembles a cartoon skull, became his first trademark. The commercial response to this figure enabled his next endeavor, the Qee (pronounced Key) figure.

In 2001, Choy designed a series of figures originally intended for use as keychains, dubbed the Qee Keychain Collection. The Qee design resembles a round and squat human form, and features a variety of animal heads and a broad range of paint applications. The Qee figure and its over 1500 variations are the signature product of the Toy2R brand.

Toy2R has collaborated with artists and designers from all over the world, including illustrators such as Gary Baseman, Tim Biskup, Coop, Tara McPherson, David Horvath and Frank Kozik. Toy2R has also been commissioned to create exclusive Qee figures for such companies as Adidas, DKNY, Mitsubishi, Microsoft, Nokia, Sony, and Starbucks.
