= Rick Leonard =

American football player (born 1996)

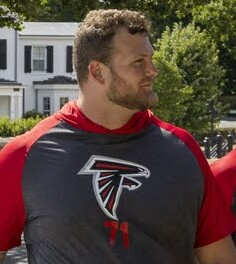
- Leonard with the Atlanta Falcons in 2022

No. 71
- Position: Offensive tackle

Personal information
- Born: November 22, 1996 (age 29); Middletown, Maryland, U.S.
- Listed height: 6 ft 7 in (2.01 m)
- Listed weight: 311 lb (141 kg)

Career information
- High school: Middletown
- College: Florida State
- NFL draft: 2018: 4th round, 127th overall pick

Career history
- New Orleans Saints (2018)*; Los Angeles Rams (2018)*; Arizona Cardinals (2018)*; Houston Texans (2019–2020)*; Arizona Cardinals (2020)*; Washington Football Team (2020–2021)*; Atlanta Falcons (2021)*; Minnesota Vikings (2021)*; Atlanta Falcons (2021)
- * Offseason or practice squad member only

Career NFL statistics
- Games played: 2
- Stats at Pro Football Reference

Rick Leonard (born November 22, 1996) is an American former professional football player who was an offensive tackle in the National Football League (NFL). He played college football for the Florida State Seminoles, where he started out as a defensive end before moving to offensive tackle. He was selected by the New Orleans Saints in the fourth round of the 2018 NFL draft and has since been a member of several other teams.

== College career ==
A four-star recruit, Leonard committed to Florida State in 2014 as a defensive end, over offers from Arizona, Clemson, Maryland, Pittsburgh, Tennessee, Washington, and Wisconsin, among others. In his freshman season, he played in four games as a reserve. Leonard compiled five tackles and 2.5 tackles for loss as a sophomore and played in all 13 games. After two seasons on defense, he transitioned to the offensive line before the 2016 season. He started the first three games at right tackle in 2016, before being replaced. Leonard regained his starting role for the final three games of the season. In 2017, Leonard started all 13 games at left tackle for the Seminoles.

== Professional career ==
=== New Orleans Saints ===
Leonard was selected by the New Orleans Saints in the fourth round, 127th overall, of the 2018 NFL draft. On May 10, 2018, Leonard signed his rookie contract with the Saints. He was waived on September 1, and was re-signed to the practice squad the next day. Leonard was released by the Saints on October 2.

=== Los Angeles Rams ===
On October 9, 2018, Leonard was signed to the Los Angeles Rams' practice squad. He was released by the Rams on November 6.

=== Arizona Cardinals (first stint) ===
On November 14, 2018, Leonard was signed to the Arizona Cardinals' practice squad.

=== Houston Texans ===
On January 9, 2019, Leonard signed a reserve/future contract with the Houston Texans. The Texans waived him on August 31 during final roster cuts. On September 1, Leonard was signed to the Texans' practice squad.

Leonard signed a reserve/future contract with the Texans on January 13, 2020. On September 5, Leonard was waived by the Texans.

=== Arizona Cardinals (second stint) ===
On September 22, 2020, Leonard was signed to the Arizona Cardinals' practice squad. He was released on October 1, and later re-signed to the practice squad on October 20. Leonard was released by the Cardinals on November 24.

=== Washington Football Team ===
Leonard signed with the Washington Football Team's practice squad on December 1, 2020. On January 11, 2021, Leonard signed a reserve/futures contract with Washington. He was waived/injured on August 24, and reverted to injured reserve before being waived with an injury settlement on September 2.

=== Atlanta Falcons ===
On November 18, 2021, Leonard was signed to the Atlanta Falcons' practice squad. He was released on December 7.

=== Minnesota Vikings ===
On December 28, 2021, Leonard was signed to the Minnesota Vikings' practice squad.

=== Atlanta Falcons (second stint) ===
On December 31, 2021, Leonard was signed by the Atlanta Falcons off of the Vikings' practice squad. His first career game was against the Buffalo Bills on January 2, 2022. Leonard was waived by Buffalo on August 26.
