= Atefeh Amir-Ebrahimi =

Iranian nurse and politician

- عاطفه امیرابراهیمی

Member of the National Consultative Assembly
- In office 1 September 1971 – 7 September 1975
- Constituency: Baft, Kerman

Personal details
- Born: 1928 Tehran, Iran
- Died: 9 January 2004 (aged 75–76) West Menlo Park, California, United States
- Party: Iran Novin Party
- Children: 3

Atefeh Amir-Ebrahimi (1928 – 9 January 2004), also known as Atefeh "Amy" Bijan, was an Iranian nurse and politician. She served in the 23rd term of Iran's National Consultative Assembly as the representative for Baft and was affiliated with the Iran Novin Party.

== Life and career ==
Amir-Ebrahimi was born in 1928 in Tehran, Iran. She studied in England, where she earned a bachelor's degree in nursing and midwifery.

She later served as a nurse adviser at the Faculty of Medicine, University of Tehran and was president of the Iranian Nurses Association. Amir-Ebrahimi also founded a hospital in Tehran.

Amir-Ebrahimi was a member of the Iran Novin Party and served on its Social and Arts Affairs Committee. She represented Baft in Kerman Province in the 23rd National Consultative Assembly from 1 September 1971 to 7 September 1975.

She was married to an Iranian physician, Dr. Bijan Bijan, and the couple had three children including Donia Bijan.

In 1978, amid the political unrest preceding the Iranian Revolution, Amir-Ebrahimi and her family left Iran and later settled in the United States, where she continued working as a nurse.

She also volunteered as a nurse during the Kosovo War.

Amir-Ebrahimi died on 9 January 2004 after being struck by a car while walking in a crosswalk on Santa Cruz Avenue in West Menlo Park, California. In the same year, Lucile Packard Children's Hospital at Stanford and its Becoming Parents program established the Amy Bijan Scholarship for couples unable to afford prenatal education, in memory of her work teaching childbirth classes.
