= Middletown High School (Maryland) =

Location
- 200 Schoolhouse Drive; Middletown, Frederick, Maryland 21769; United States; 39°26′47″N 77°32′04″W

Information
- Type: Public
- Established: 1888
- School board: Frederick County Public Schools
- Superintendent: Cheryl Dyson
- Principal: Bernard Quesada
- Grades: 9–12
- Enrollment: 1,135 (2018-19)
- Campus type: Rural
- Colours: Orange, Black
- Slogan: "A Tradition of Knowledge, Creativity, Strength, Leadership."
- Athletics conference: MPSSA Class 2A; West Region
- Mascot: Knights
- Publication: RT Magazine
- Newspaper: The Round Table
- Yearbook: Chestnut Burr
- Feeder schools: Middletown Primary Middletown Elementary; Myersville Elementary; Wolfsville Elementary Middletown Middle
- Athletic league: Central Maryland Conference (CMC)
- Website: https://mhs.sites.fcps.org/

Middletown High School is a high school located in Middletown, Maryland, United States. First established in 1888, the school opened in its current building in April 1974.

== Student activities ==
MHS offers 162 sports teams in 125 sports, visual and performing arts, academic societies, agriculture and club organizations. Many extracurricular clubs, including an Academic Team, Physics Club, Model UN, National Honors Society, Science National Honor Society, Mu Alpha Theta Math Honor Society, Tri-M Music Honors society, Future Business Leaders of America, Nu Delta Alpha Dance Honors Society, Mock Trial, Drama Club, TBA Improv Troupe, National English Honors Society, Rho Kappa National Social Studies Honor Society, Student Government Association (SGA), FFA, Gay-Straight Alliance, and Fellowship of Christian Athletes.

=== Music ===
The school's band are called the "Marching Knights" and since 2002 have been directed by Matthew Shearer. In 2006 the band placed 4th at the James Madison University Parade of Champions. They also received the award for best colorguard in their class. In the fall of 2014, the Marching Knights became US Bands Group IIIA MD State Champions at the State Championship at Towson University.The Marching Knights won first place at the JMU Parade of Champions in 2023 with their performance theme of James Bond. The Middletown High School Marching Knights won 1st Place at the MMBA State Championship at Towson University with their performance theme of Top Gun in 2025, where they also received best Color Guard and Overall Effect.

=== Athletics ===
The school's colors are orange and black, and athletic teams are known as the “Knights.”

Maryland (MPSSAA) State Titles
Boys Track and Field	1970, 1972, 1973, 1974, 1985, 1999, 2000, 2001, 2003, 2004[1]
Boys Cross Country	1970, 1972, 1973, 1976, 1979, 1982, 1983, 1984
Girls Cross Country	1981, 1991, 1992, 1997, 1998, 1999, 2000
Girls Soccer	1990, 1999, 2000, 2004, 2010, 2011, 2012
Girls Field hockey	1981, 1984, 1985, 1986, 1987, 1991
Boys Soccer	1973, 1980, 1993, 2015, 2016
Girls Basketball	1978, 1989, 1993, 2006
Football	2011, 2012, 2013, 2019
Golf	1996, 2009, 2017
Girls Track and Field	2000, 2007, 2008
Girls Indoor Track	2008, 2009
Boys Indoor Track	2003, 2007
Girls Swimming	2008
Baseball	2017
Boys Lacrosse	2025

== Academic programs ==
In 2003 MHS implemented the county's first APEX (Advanced Placement Experience) program for a select group of Freshmen. Students in the program commit to taking a minimum of six AP courses in high school, beginning in the sophomore year. Because of the school's emphasis on AP courses the number of students taking AP exams in the past two years has nearly doubled. MHS was also the county's first high school to establish a Freshman Academy to maximize student achievement during the often-difficult transition from Middle to High School. As of the 2006-2007 School Year, The Advisement Programme was terminated for reasons unknown to the general public at MHS.

- Maryland Department of Education Commendation for Maryland School Assessment Performance, 2004
- In 2005 received a $10,000 technology grant from Intel Corporation, awarded for internal teamwork

== Notable alumni ==
- Rob Ambrose – American football coach for Towson Tigers
- Jason Freeny (1970) – Sculptor and toy designer
- Megan Gebbia (1990) – women's college basketball head coach with American and Wake Forest
- Matt Huseman – musician
- Charlie “King Kong” Keller – 5x Major League Baseball All-Star for New York Yankees and Detroit Tigers, 4x World Series champion
- Hal Keller – Major League Baseball player and former vice president/general manager for Seattle Mariners
- Rick Leonard – American football player for Florida State Seminoles and New Orleans Saints
- Amber Theoharis (1996) – co-host with the NFL Network show NFL Total Access
