= Bossy Bear (TV series) =

American children's animated television series

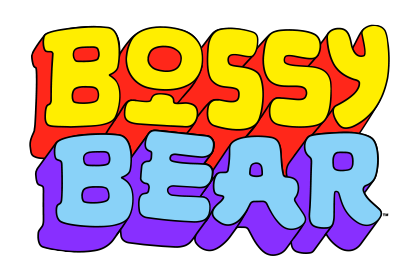
- Genre: Comedy; Slice of life; Preschool
- Created by: David Horvath; Sun-Min Kim
- Developed by: Jason Hopley; Jeff D'Elia
- Directed by: Sam Dransfield
- Voices of: Jayden Ham; Jaba Keh; Viva Lee; Claudia Choi; Shaun Baer
- Theme music composer: Joachim Svare; Joleen Belle
- Opening theme: "Bossy Bear Theme Song" (written by Joachim Svare, Joleen Belle, and SQVARE, performed by SQVARE)
- Ending theme: "Bossy Bear Theme Song" (Instrumental)
- Composers: Craig McConnell; Daniel Ingram; Trevor Hoffmann
- Country of origin: United States
- Original language: English
- No. of seasons: 1
- No. of episodes: 30 (90 segments)

Production
- Executive producers: Brian Grazer; Ron Howard; Stephanie Sperber; Elly Kramer Posner; Bob Mittenthal; David Horvath; Sun-Min Kim; Ashley Postlewaite
- Producer: Derek Kedell
- Editor: Jeff D'Elia
- Running time: 22 minutes (7 minutes per segment)
- Production companies: Imagine Kids+Family; Renegade Animation; Nickelodeon Animation Studio

Original release
- Network: Nickelodeon (2023-2024); Nick Jr. Channel (2023-2024)
- Release: March 6, 2023 – February 29, 2024

Bossy Bear is an American animated television series based on the book series of the same name by David Horvath. The series premiered on March 6, 2023 on Nick Jr.. It also aired on Treehouse TV in Canada on September 8, 2023.

== Premise ==
The series centers on the adventures of Bossy Bear and his best friend Turtle in the town of Pleasantburg.

== Characters ==
=== Main ===
- Bossy Bear (voiced by Jayden Ham) - An anthropomorphized blue bear who is the titular protagonist.
- Turtle (voiced by Jaba Keh) - A green turtle who is Bossy's best friend.
- Bissy Bear (voiced by Viva Lee) - A pink bear who is Bossy's older sister.
- Cindy Bear (voiced by Viva Lee) - A yellow bear who is Bossy's baby sister. She can only say her name.
- Bossy's Mom (voiced by Claudia Choi)
- Bossy's Dad (voiced by Shaun Baer)
- Gran Gran (voiced by Claudia Choi) - Turtle's grandmother who at times offer words of wisdom to her grandson and Bossy.
- Ginger (voiced by Beahlen Deacon) - An orange squirrel who is Bissy's best friend.
- Roller (voiced by Rae Gray) - A green reindeer who is Bossy and Turtle friend and originally from a country called Reindeerlanden.
- Chipper (voiced by Sarah Vattano) - A chipmunk who is Bossy, Turtle and Roller friend.
- Saddiq (voiced by Kiran Fields) - A purple octopus who recently moved in Pleasantburg.
- Ms. Elky (voiced by Anairis Quiñones) - A elk who is Bossy and Turtle teacher.
- Tyler (voiced by Lance Bass) - A owl who is Greg's husband and Ginger's adoptive daughter.
- Greg (voiced by Michael Turchin) - A squirrel who is Tyler's husband and Ginger's adoptive daughter.
- Falcon (voiced by Nick Martineau)
- Owl (voiced by Nick Martineau)
- Dove (voiced by Nick Martineau)
- Flamingo (voiced by Nick Martineau)

=== Supporting ===
- Bertram (voiced by Luke Lowe)
- Louie (voiced by Luke Lowe)
- Gina (voiced by Beahlen Deacon)
- Jojo (voiced by Sarah Vattano)
- Honey Bear (voiced by Kensington Tallman) - Bossy's cynical cousin who likes to bully Bossy and Turtle. She has a father who is mute.
- Chipper's Mom (voiced by Misty Lee)
- Roller’s Dad (voiced by Joe Zieja)

== Episodes ==
No.	Title	Written by	Storyboarded by	Original release date	Prod. code	U.S. viewers (millions)
1	"Ultimate Hype Bear"	Grant Jossi	Jose Pepe Mansuy	March 6, 2023	106	N/A
1	"The Chrysalis Crew"	Josh Riley Brown	Gerry Fournier	March 6, 2023	106	N/A
1	"Just Say No"	Bob Mittenthal	Jose Pepe Mansuy	March 6, 2023	106	N/A
2	"Missing Falcon"	Jeffrey D'Elia	Rob Davies	March 7, 2023	101	N/A
2	"Happy Bestie-Versary"	Teresa Lee	Kevin Karkey	March 7, 2023	101	N/A
2	"The Tuminator"	Jeffrey D'Elia and Jason Hopley	Samuel Dransfield	March 7, 2023	101	N/A
3	"The Turtle Tour"	Jeffrey D'Elia	Dave Alvarez	March 8, 2023	102	N/A
3	"Honey Bear"	Ed Lee	Dave Alvarez	March 8, 2023	102	N/A
3	"The Science Pair"	Mike Carrier and Taylor Cox	Rob Davies	March 8, 2023	102	N/A
4	"Bossy's Super Social Saturday"	Michael Vogel	Jason Gauthier	March 9, 2023	103	N/A
4	"Center of a Tension"	Jeffrey D'Elia	Chris Labonte	March 9, 2023	103	N/A
4	"Cart-tastrophe"	Jeffrey D'Elia and Jason Hopley	Jose Pepe Mansuy	March 9, 2023	103	N/A
5	"Turtle's Shell Day"	Ritza Bloom	Jose Pepe Mansuy	March 13, 2023	104	N/A
5	"The Way of the Gran-Gran"	Jeffrey D'Elia	Jason Gauthier	March 13, 2023	104	N/A
5	"The Spring Kick-Off Games"	Teresa Lee	John Flagg	March 13, 2023	104	N/A
6	"Show and Smell"	Joon Chung	John Flagg	March 14, 2023	105	N/A
6	"Don't Look Now"	Susan Kim	Chris Labonte	March 15, 2023	105	N/A
6	"Two's a Bestie, Three's a Crowd"	Magda Liolis	Gerry Fournier	March 16, 2023	105	N/A
7	"Ultra Shell and Wonder Bear"	Sam Clarke	Jason Gauthier	March 20, 2023	107	N/A
7	"You Ain't Seen Nothing Yeti"	Caroline Renard	Jason Gauthier	March 20, 2023	107	N/A
7	"Powerless"	Leore Berris	Dave Alvarez	March 20, 2023	107	N/A
8	"Spectacular Skating Spectacular"	Annie Nishida	Jess Pollard	March 21, 2023	108	N/A
8	"Gran-Gran Dreams of Japchae"	Lauren Shell	Chris Labonte	March 22, 2023	108	N/A
8	"Snow Party"	Benjamin Weiner	Chris Labonte	March 23, 2023	108	N/A
9	"New Squid on the Block"	Caroline Renard	Jess Pollard	March 27, 2023	110	N/A
9	"Boss Bissy"	Magda Liolis	Steve Whitehouse	March 27, 2023	110	N/A
9	"To BFF or Not to BFF"	Joon Chung	Jose Pepe Mansuy	March 27, 2023	110	N/A
10	"A New New Year"	Susan Kim	Alessio Menghi	March 28, 2023	111	N/A
10	"Finders Keepers"	Susan Kim	Jess Pollard	March 29, 2023	111	N/A
10	"Busy Buddies"	Sam Clarke	Jose Pepe Mansuy	March 30, 2023	111	N/A
11	"Sleepover Blues"	Gloria Shen	Chris Labonte	May 1, 2023	112	N/A
11	"Roll With It"	Magda Liolis	Steve Whitehouse	May 1, 2023	112	N/A
11	"A Day Behind"	Josh Riley Brown	Jason Gauthier	May 1, 2023	112	N/A
12	"Space Invader"	Benjamin Weiner	Kent Webb	May 2, 2023	113	N/A
12	"Reindeer's Game"	Annie Nishida	Jason Gauthier	May 3, 2023	113	N/A
12	"Short Kites"	Mike Carrier and Taylor Cox	John Flagg	May 4, 2023	113	N/A
13	"Jelly Juggernaut"	Grant Jossi	Chris Labonte	May 8, 2023	114	N/A
13	"One Bear Show"	Sarah Nerboso	Jess Pollard	May 8, 2023	114	N/A
13	"Snowmania"	Josh Riley Brown	Alessio Menghi	May 8, 2023	114	N/A
14	"Dad's Big Surprise"	Brittany Rochford	Jose Pepe Mansuy	May 9, 2023	115	N/A
14	"Scout's Honor"	Annie Nishida	Jason Gauthier	May 10, 2023	115	N/A
14	"The Magic Word"	Leore Berris	John Flagg	May 11, 2023	115	N/A
15	"Latke Lark"	Sam Bissonnette	Jose Pepe Mansuy	May 15, 2023	116	N/A
15	"Game Plan"	Alyson Piekarsky	Kent Webb	May 15, 2023	116	N/A
15	"Hand Me Downer"	Leore Berris	Chris Labonte	May 15, 2023	116	N/A
16	"Lil' Kimchi King and Kween"	Joon Chung	Jason Gauthier	May 16, 2023	117	N/A
16	"Don't Go Miss Elky"	Becky Prosky	Jess Pollard	May 17, 2023	117	N/A
16	"Doctor Chipper"	Sarah Nerboso	Alessio Menghi	May 18, 2023	117	N/A
17	"Nightmare on Sweet Street"	Brittany Rochford	Erin Mercer	October 9, 2023	118	N/A
17	"Monster Mess"	Annie Nishida	Dino Pai	October 9, 2023	118	N/A
17	"Fall Bestival"	Magda Liolis	Erin Mercer	October 9, 2023	118	N/A
18	"Candle with Care"	Leore Berris	Alessio Menghi	December 8, 2023	129	N/A
18	"Happy Froofenfröögle!"	Jeffrey D’Elia	John Flagg	December 8, 2023	129	N/A
18	"The Winter Gift Swap"	Susan Kim	Jason Gauthier	December 8, 2023	129	N/A
19	"Birthdaze"	Benjamin Weiner	Tod Carter	January 15, 2024	109	N/A
19	"Squid 'n Play"	Gloria Shen	Jose Pepe Mansuy	January 15, 2024	109	N/A
19	"Board to Tears"	Susan Kim	Joanna Davidovich	January 15, 2024	109	N/A
20	"Pick and Chew"	Elizabeth Chun	Jess Pollard	January 16, 2024	119	N/A
20	"Mr. Bossy and Mr. Turtle"	Benjamin Weiner	Steve Whitehouse	January 16, 2024	119	N/A
20	"Dance Like Everyone's Watching"	Sarah Jenkins	Kent Webb	January 16, 2024	119	N/A
21	"A Card Days Night"	Grant Jossi	Jason Gauthier	January 17, 2024	120	N/A
21	"Boom Boom Super Regret"	Carleton Carter	Sam Niemann	January 17, 2024	120	N/A
21	"A Tight Squeeze"	Sam Clarke	John Flagg	January 17, 2024	120	N/A
22	"Battle of the Besties"	Alyson Piekarsky	Alessio Menghi	January 18, 2024	121	N/A
22	"When Lemons Give You a Mess"	Lloyd Suh	Kent Webb	January 18, 2024	121	N/A
22	"Do the Kite Thing"	Michael Rhea	Erin Mercer	January 18, 2024	121	N/A
23	"By the Book"	Magda Liolis	Erin Mercer	February 20, 2024	123	N/A
23	"Antlerless"	Bob Mittenthal	Jason Gauthier	February 20, 2024	123	N/A
23	"If the Boot Doesn't Fit"	Elizabeth Chun	Jose Pepe Mansuy	February 20, 2024	123	N/A
24	"The Clean Team"	Susan Kim	Kent Webb	February 21, 2024	124	N/A
24	"The Thinkybubble Boxen"	Leore Berris	Alessio Menghi	February 21, 2024	124	N/A
24	"Bubble Bubble Bossy and Trouble"	Benjamin Weiner	Steve Whitehouse	February 21, 2024	124	N/A
25	"Save the Planet"	Carleton Carter	Jose Pepe Mansuy	February 22, 2024	125	N/A
25	"Keytar All-Star"	Sam Bissonnette	Jess Pollard	February 22, 2024	125	N/A
25	"The Adventures of Randy Rock"	Annie Nishida	Erin Mercer	February 22, 2024	125	N/A
26	"President Bossy"	Josh Riley Brown	Steve Whitehouse	February 23, 2024	122	N/A
26	"Super Flock Snooze Fest"	Brittany Rochford	Jess Pollard	February 23, 2024	122	N/A
26	"Commander Crumble"	JT Tsou	John Flagg	February 23, 2024	122	N/A
27	"Ultra Shell Returns"	Michael Rhea	Nicole Luo	February 26, 2024	126	N/A
27	"Cham Cham Champion"	Susan Kim	Alessio Menghi	February 26, 2024	126	N/A
27	"Sing Your Voice Out"	Grant Jossi	Kent Webb	February 26, 2024	126	N/A
28	"The Shiniest Shell"	Brittany Rochford	John Flagg	February 27, 2024	127	N/A
28	"Match Set"	Sarah Nerboso	Steve Whitehouse	February 27, 2024	127	N/A
28	"Dad's Day Off"	Josh Rliey Brown	Jose Pepe Mansuy	February 27, 2024	127	N/A
29	"Bee Very Careful"	Hanah Lee Cook	Jess Pollard	February 28, 2024	128	N/A
29	"Time Flies When You're Having No Fun"	Sara E.B. Osman	Alessio Menghi	February 28, 2024	128	N/A
29	"Toy Vs. Toy"	Elizabeth Chun	Kent Webb	February 28, 2024	128	N/A
30	"The Worst Bad Day Ever"	Sarah Nerboso	Steve Whitehouse	February 29, 2024	130	N/A
30	"Chef Cindy's Kitchen"	Jessica Tsou	Nicole Luo	February 29, 2024	130	N/A
30	"Deer Pressure"	Jeffrey D'Elia	Jess Pollard	February 29, 2024	130	N/A

== Reception ==
Common Sense Media gave the series 4 out of 5 stars.

=== Accolades ===
Bossy Bear was nominated for Outstanding Children's Programming at the 35th GLAAD Media Awards.
