= Raul Melgoza =

Mexican-American fashion designer (born 1972)

- Born: 15 July 1972; Los Angeles, California, US
- Died: July 18, 2020 (aged 48)
- Occupation: Fashion designer

Raul Melgoza was a Mexican-American fashion designer. Melgoza designed clothes for royalty, celebrities and actresses.

== Career ==
In 2006, after graduating from Parsons, Melgoza became well known in the New York fashion scene, and became the Creative Designer for the haute couture fashion house, LUCA LUCA. By the fall collection of 2008, the fashion house saw rise in attention and sales. He designed dresses for personalities including Amy Adams, Emma Stone, Ashley Tisdale, Jamie-Lynn Sigler, Carol Alt, Serena Williams and Petra Nemcova.

Melgoza died on July 18, 2020, of lung cancer.

== See also ==
- List of fashion designers
- List of Parsons The New School for Design people
