= Eichler Network =

American company

- Founder: Marty Arbunich
- Country of origin: United States
- Headquarters location: San Francisco
- Distribution: California
- Publication types: Magazine
- Nonfiction topics: Mid-century modern homes, Eichler homes, home improvement, modern lifestyle
- Official website: www.eichlernetwork.com

The Eichler Network is an American company that produces a website and weekly email news articles about mid-century modern (MCM) homes in California. It also publishes an annual printed Home Maintenance Directory and online service directory of contractors and other service providers who focus on modern home preservation and improvement. The Eichler Network was founded by Marty Arbunich, first as the quarterly Eichler Network print newsletter in 1993, then as the 36-page, full-color CA-Modern magazine from 2006 to 2023. While the Fall 2023 issue of CA-Modern was the final issue of the printed magazine, the publisher continues to serve homeowners with its website, email newsletters, the printed Home Maintenance Directory, and social media.

Central to the Eichler Network's mission is the preservation of Eichler homes and other mid-century modern homes, which are notable and highly valued as representative of modern design principles promoted by the architect Frank Lloyd Wright and others. The Eichler Network has been recognized for its work in preserving the unique character of mid-century modern homes, having been featured in the New York Times and in Preservation, The Magazine for the National Trust for Historic Preservation. The Eichler Network has also partnered with the Los Angeles Conservancy in its mission to preserve Southern California's mid-century modern legacy.

In 2012, the Eichler Network and its magazine CA-Modern became part of the national conversation surrounding the life of Apple innovator Steve Jobs, who as a child lived in a mid-century modern home.

The Eichler Network serves the owners of approximately 11,000 Eichler and other mid-century modern homes. These homes consist primarily of Eichlers in the San Francisco Bay Area and Marin County, Streng homes in Sacramento, and three small Eichler communities in Southern California (and three Eichler-built residences in upstate New York). The Eichler Network earns revenue by selling advertising to contractors, real estate agents and other firms that focus on mid-century modern homes. All contractors are vetted by the Eichler Network.

The Eichler Network’s website provides an archive with original content and hundreds of articles, including pieces on home improvement, profiles of modern designers and artists, and nostalgic features on music and arts, with a focus on the mid-century. The site includes homes for sale, a directory of service providers, a readers forum (Chatterbox Lounge) on such topics as home maintenance and a rec room for reader recommendations on companies and products.

Over the years the Eichler Network has increased its focus on the aesthetics and historical value of Eichler and other mid-century modern homes. It "counsels a new generation on taking care of quirky, aging Modernist houses," according to the New York Times. The Eichler Network held a conference on the subject in 2002, and Marty Arbunich co-authored the 2002 book, Eichler: Modernism Rebuilds the American Dream, with architect Paul Adamson. The Eichler Network, in conjunction with the Historic Quest committee, also spearheaded the successful effort to place the first two Eichler neighborhoods in the Bay Area on the National Register for Historic Places in 2005.

== See also ==
- CA-Modern
