= Uglydoll =

Plush toys

- Product type: Plush toys
- Current owner: Sun-Min Kim + David Horvath / PUL LLC present)
- Country: United States
- Introduced: February 14, 2001
- Markets: World

Uglydoll is a brand and series of plush toys created by Sun-Min Kim, based on an idea by Kim and her husband David Horvath. The Uglydoll line was launched on February 14, 2001, and was awarded the Specialty Toy of the Year award by the Toy Industry Association in 2006. After several years of not producing any characters from the original line, due to the movie deal, the dolls returned in 2024. The initial release includes six dolls, OX, Babo, Trunko, Moxy, Blue Ice Bat and Purple Ice Bat.

== Origin ==
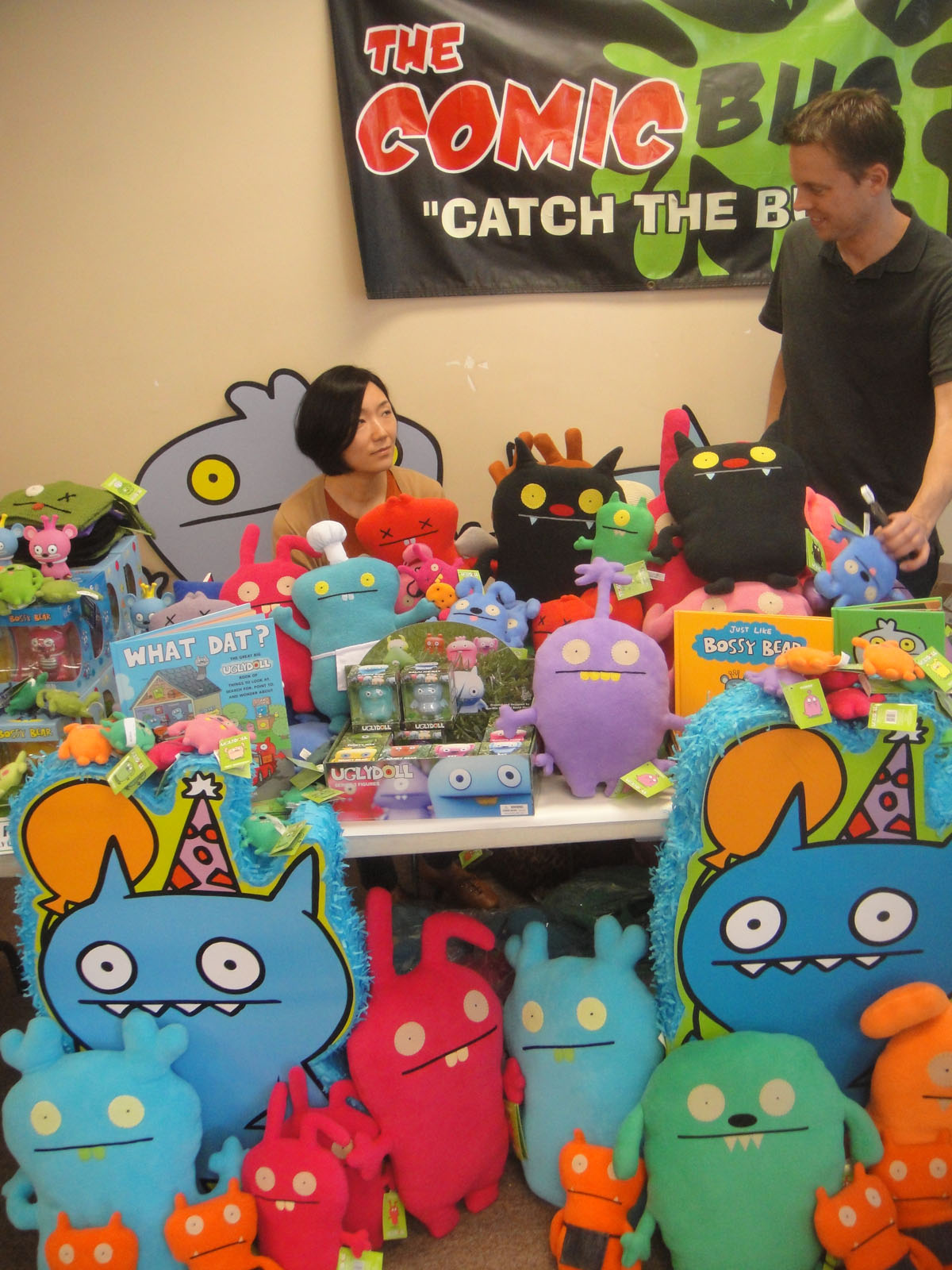
Sun-Min Kim and David Horvath, the creators of Uglydolls, at the 2012 Free Comic Book Day

Uglydoll started with a letter Horvath wrote to Kim after she had to move away due to an expiring student visa. The letter had a cartoon of his character "Wage" at the bottom with the words, "Working hard to make our dreams come true so we can be together again soon," next to it.

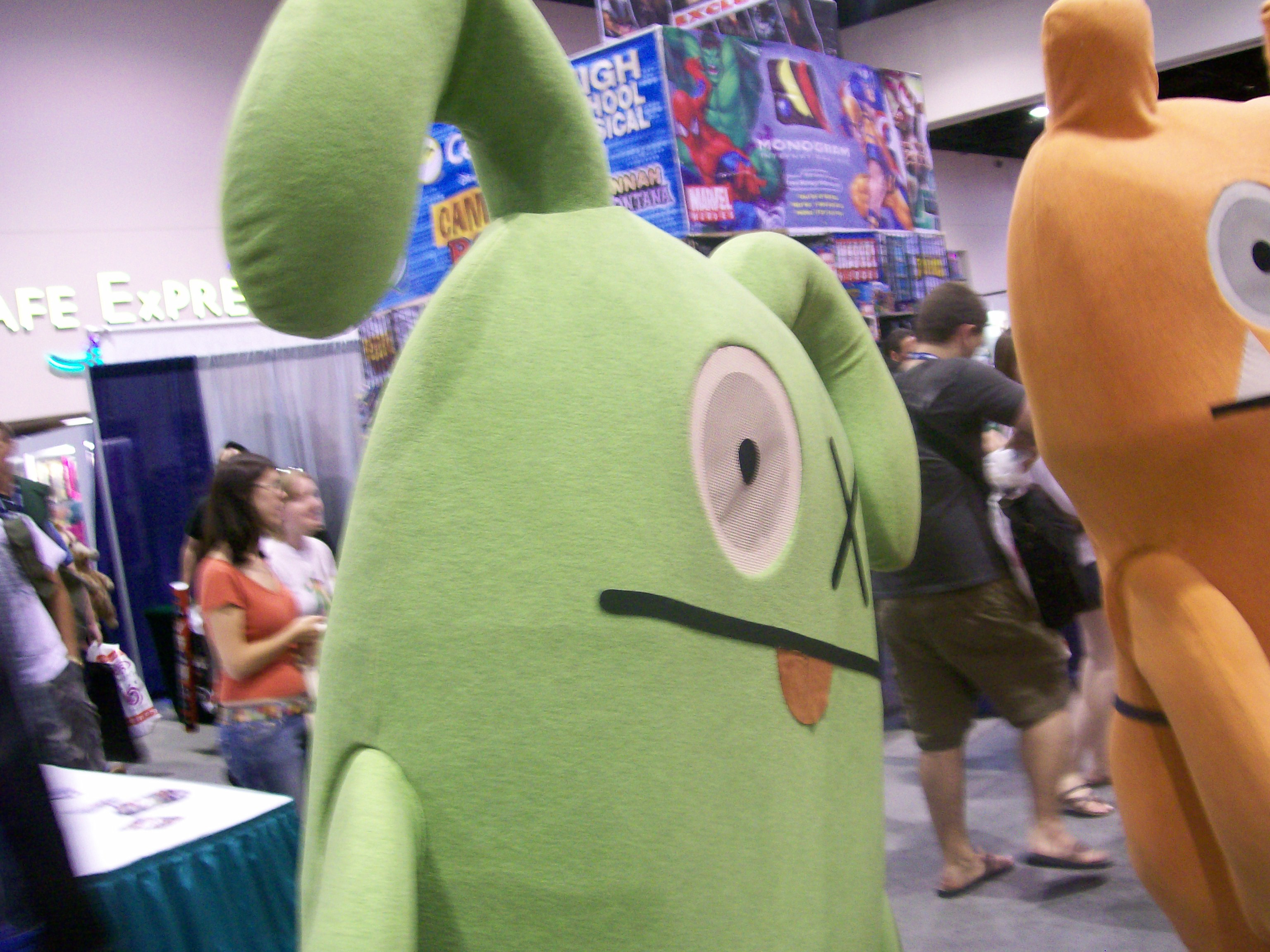
Two costumed characters of Wage (right) and Ox (left)

As a surprise gift, Kim sewed a doll of Wage and sent it to Horvath in the mail. Horvath showed Wage to his magazine publisher friend, Eric Nakamura, owner of the Giant Robot magazine and store, who thought Horvath was pitching him a product and immediately ordered a few more for his shop. Horvath wrote to Kim, asking her to sew more while sending emails with stories about Wage, Babo, and Ice-Bat's first-ever adventure, soon to become Chilly Chilly Ice-Bat.

The Uglydolls were created in 2001 and included Babo, Cinko, Ice Bat, Jeero, OX, Target, Tray, Wage, Wedgehead, and many more doll characters.

== Relaunch ==
Following the 2019 film, production of the original plush & figure lines was halted indefinitely. In 2024, the line was officially relaunched in its original form, with a line of 6 plush: OX, Babo, Moxy (the original character, not the movie invention), Trunko, and Ice-Bat in blue & purple. A second wave is planned for Winter 2025.

== In media ==
=== Film ===
In May 2011, it was announced that Illumination had acquired the rights to Uglydolls to make an animated feature film. Chris Meledandri was set to produce, with a screenplay from Larry Stuckey. The original creators, David Horvath and Sun-Min Kim, were set to executive produce. Four years later, in 2015, the American magazine Variety reported that an animated film based on Uglydolls would be the first family and animation project produced by STXfilms. The film, produced by Robert Rodriguez, was released on May 3, 2019 to negative reviews from critics and was a commercial failure.

=== Proposed television series ===
In May 2018, less than a year prior to the film's release, Hulu signed a deal with STX Entertainment to produce an animated television series based on UglyDolls. Hulu also gained VOD rights to the animated film. The series was meant to consist of 26 episodes per season with a projected release date of early 2020. However, due to the film’s financial failure, there have been no updates on the project since.

On April 25, 2026, a series made with generative AI was launched on the film's YouTube channel, which caused controversy.
