= Donia Bijan =

Iranian-American author and chef

- Born: Tehran, Iran
- Education: University of California, Berkeley
- Occupations: Author, chef
- Relatives: Atefeh Amir-Ebrahimi (mother)

Donia Bijan is an Iranian-American author and chef based in California. She is the author of the book Maman’s Homesick Pie: A Persian Heart in an American Kitchen (2011) and the novel The Last Days of Café Leila (2017).

== Life and career ==
Bijan grew up in Tehran, Iran, where her parents operated a maternity hospital. Her father was a physician and her mother a nurse active in women’s rights. In 1978, during the political unrest leading up to the Iranian Revolution, Bijan and her family left Iran and eventually settled in the United States.

Bijan studied at the University of California, Berkeley, graduating in 1984. She later trained at Le Cordon Bleu in Paris and worked as a chef in France before returning to California where she worked at many of San Francisco's acclaimed restaurants.

In 1994, she opened her restaurant, L’Amie Donia, a celebrated French bistro, in Palo Alto, California. Bijan sold the restaurant in 2004.

In 2011, Bijan's food memoir, Maman's Homesick Pie: A Persian Heart in an American Kitchen, was published by Algonquin Books. Her debut novel, The Last Days of Café Leila, was also published by Algonquin Books in 2017. The novel was translated in German as Als die Tage nach Zimt schmeckten, in Italian as La donna di Teheran, and in Arabic. Bijan has also narrated audiobooks, including Pomegranate Soup, Rosewater and Soda Bread, and The Persians.

== Personal life ==
Bijan is married to painter Mitchell Johnson. They have one son.
