= UglyDolls =

2019 animated film by Kelly Asbury

- Theatrical release poster
- Directed by: Kelly Asbury
- Screenplay by: Alison Peck
- Story by: Robert Rodriguez; Larry Stuckey (uncredited)
- Based on: Uglydoll by: David Horvath; Sun-min Kim
- Produced by: Jane Hartwell; Robert Rodriguez; Oren Aviv
- Starring: Kelly Clarkson; Janelle Monáe; Blake Shelton; Wanda Sykes; Gabriel Iglesias; Wang Leehom; Nick Jonas; Pitbull
- Edited by: Julie Rogers; Nolan Southerland
- Music by: Christopher Lennertz
- Production companies: STX Films; Alibaba Pictures
- Distributed by: STX Films (United States); VVS Films (Canada); Huaxia Film Distribution (China)
- Release date: May 3, 2019 (United States)
- Running time: 87 minutes
- Countries: United States; Canada; China
- Language: English
- Budget: $45–53 million
- Box office: $32.5 million

UglyDolls is a 2019 animated musical adventure-comedy film directed by Kelly Asbury and written by Alison Peck, from a story by Robert Rodriguez, who also produced. It is based on the plush toys of the same name by David Horvath and Sun-Min Kim, and follows a group of them as they try to find owners in the "Big World" despite their flaws. The film stars the voices of Kelly Clarkson, Janelle Monáe, Blake Shelton, Wanda Sykes, Gabriel Iglesias, Wang Leehom, Nick Jonas, and Pitbull.

UglyDolls was theatrically released by STX Films, the first animated film produced by the company. It received negative reviews from critics and grossed $32 million worldwide, and was the last film directed by Kelly Asbury, who died in June 2020 from cancer.

== Plot ==
But In a hidden universe within a toy factory, deformed dolls, or UglyDolls, are dropped into a tunnel leading to the secluded town of Uglyville. Among these dolls is Moxy, who dreams of the 'Big World' and being loved by a child, despite Uglyville's Mayor Ox assuring her this concept is a myth. One day, Moxy and her shy advisor friend Lucky Bat talk about the big world; inspired by this conversation, Moxy and Lucky, followed by the town's cynical baker Wage, easy-going Ugly Dog, and soft-hearted giant Babo, journey up the tunnel.

The UglyDolls discover the Institute of Perfection where its vain and superficial leader of the Perfect Dolls (or "Pretties") Lou tells the UglyDolls that they have no chance of passing the Gauntlet - an obstacle course based on a human house that determines if a doll may use the portal to the Big World. Lou eventually allows them to train for the Gauntlet, but sends his three Spy Girls to find out where Moxy's group came from.

The UglyDolls' first days of training end in disaster. Mandy, one of the Pretties with poor eyesight and a reluctance to wear glasses for fear of being labeled ugly, sympathizes with the UglyDolls and gives them some pointers on how to become a Perfect Doll.

The Spy Girls return with a kidnapped Ox who admits to Moxy that he knew about the Big World as he had once trained for the Gauntlet and nearly passed before the Pretties turned on him. Lou sent him down the tunnel, claiming he thought it led to safety, where Ox found the recycling center. Seeing other dolls like himself being shredded, he rerouted the tunnel and founded Uglyville at the other end.

Demoralized by the realization that they are factory rejects, the entire town of Uglyville falls into despair and Moxy resigns herself to her fate. Mandy visits and encourages Moxy to keep her faith, as it has given all the imperfect Pretties hope that they might succeed. Moxy and Mandy are then ambushed by the Spy Girls and taken to Lou, who has unblocked the recycling center. He breaks Mandy's glasses, and leaves her and Moxy to be shredded. Ox rallies the UglyDolls to rescue the pair.

The entire population of Uglyville arrives at the Institute on the day of the Gauntlet. Moxy, Mandy, and several Uglies demand to be allowed to participate. Lou announces he and several others will run with them, secretly planning to sabotage their chances. After the Uglies and Lou make it to the end, they are stopped by a robotic baby. Lou kicks the baby and advances to the finish line, but Moxy and the other UglyDolls stop to comfort the baby as it cries. The system automatically passes them, as a doll's true purpose is to make a child happy. After failing despite completing the course, Lou admits he is forbidden to leave the factory as he is a prototype, and had sabotaged Ox out of jealousy. He then destroys the portal to the human world, but the Uglies and Pretties work together to build a new portal that does not require any training to pass through. They combine their towns into the City of Imperfection, still led by Mayor Ox. Moxy finally passes through the portal and is gifted to a child, Maizy, who has the same missing tooth as she does.

The credits show that several dolls have been matched to a human while a disgruntled Lou has been demoted to janitorial duty.

== Cast ==
- Kelly Clarkson as Moxy, a pink UglyDoll with lots of confidence, hope, and curiosity. Her design is based on that of Gorgeous, a character from the original toyline. She hopes to one day, be loved by a child, and never gives up.
- Janelle Monáe as Mandy, a kindhearted perfect doll who wears glasses for eyesight problems and befriends the Ugly Dolls. Mandy also encourages Moxy to not give up, even after the whole town is devastated.
- Blake Shelton as Ox, a green UglyDoll with a X eye and the Unofficial Mayor of Uglyville, mentor to all of the other Ugly Dolls and former friend of Lou. He attempts to hide the concept of "children" and “the big world” from the UglyDolls, but fails when Moxy discovers it with her friends.
- Wanda Sykes as Wage, an orange UglyDoll and cynical baker who can be frequently found cooking up some amazing and inventive culinary concoctions. She tries to not come with Moxy to the "big world", as she claims she has better things to do, but is convinced. She reveals she thinks Moxy is brave, and she is too scared to go.
- Gabriel Iglesias as Babo, a grey UglyDoll and the largest of the UglyDolls who holds lots of items in his pocket.
- Wang Leehom as Lucky Bat, a red bat-like UglyDoll who is the thoughtful but shy adviser, who fails at his mission of telling Moxy that the "big world" does not exist, and accidentally encourages her that it does.
- Bebe Rexha as Tuesday, a blue-haired perfect doll and one of the Spy Girls
- Charli XCX as Kitty, a pink-haired perfect doll and one of the Spy Girls
- Lizzo as Lydia, a purple-haired perfect doll and one of the Spy Girls
- Nick Jonas as Lou, the preppy prototype leader from the town of Perfection and a bully towards the Ugly Dolls and the other imperfect dolls, wanting everyone who gets a child to be perfect.
- Pitbull as Ugly Dog, a one-eyed blue dog-like UglyDoll and Moxy's closest friend.
  - Pitbull reprises his role in the Spanish dub.
- Ice-T as Peggy, a small one-eyed pegacorn
- Emma Roberts as Wedgehead, a yellow UglyDoll and the newest citizen of Uglyville
- Kelly Asbury as the following roles before his death in 2020:
  - Gibberish Cat, a cat-like UglyDoll whose name is self-explanatory.
  - Oliver, an insect-like UglyDoll who admits that he gets greedy with soup.
  - A large chef UglyDoll that serves soup during Uglyville's time of despair
  - Buttons, Moxy's printer
- Jane Lynch as the scanner that decides the role of the Institute of Perfection's new arrivals with many of them being part models
- Natalie Martinez as Meghan, a lawyer and model at the Institute of Perfection
- Stephen Zimpel as Michael, an engineer and model at the Institute of Perfection
- Enrique Santos as Nolan, a doll at the Institute of Perfection who Lou calls ugly, and was born yesterday. Starts the song “The Ugly Truth”, after asking about Lou.
- Rob Riggle as the Exposition Robots who oversee the exams at the Institute of Perfection
- Steven Schweickart as a new arrival to Uglyville during its despair
- Afi Ekulona as Tray, a three-eyed purple UglyDoll wearing three-eyed glasses who has three brains
- Jacques Colimon as Sporko, a spork-shaped UglyDoll

== Production ==
In May 2011, it was announced that Illumination had acquired the rights to Uglydolls to make an animated feature film. Chris Meledandri was set to produce, with a screenplay from Larry Stuckey. The original creators, David Horvath and Sun-Min Kim, were set to executive produce. Four years later, in 2015, Variety magazine reported that an animated film based on Uglydolls would be the first project produced by STX Entertainment's new "family and animation" division. On March 28, 2017, Robert Rodriguez signed on to direct, write, and produce the film, with a release date set for May 10, 2019. Animation for the film was done at Reel FX Creative Studios.

In March 2018, it was announced that the voice of rapper Pitbull would be featured in the film for an unknown role, and he would also provide an original song for the film. In May 2018, it was announced that Kelly Asbury had signed on to direct the feature film. In July 2018, another singer Kelly Clarkson joined the voice cast of the film as the voice of Moxy, and would provide an original song for the film. In August 2018, Nick Jonas joined the voice cast of the film, and he would also perform an original song for the film. In September 2018, comedians Wanda Sykes and Gabriel Iglesias joined the film. On September 20, 2018, it was announced that country music singer Blake Shelton had joined the film, and would voice Ox, as well as performing original music. In October 2018, it was announced that Wang Leehom, Janelle Monáe and Emma Roberts had been cast in the film.

== Music ==
The film features original music from Kelly Clarkson, Nick Jonas, Blake Shelton, Janelle Monáe, Bebe Rexha, Pentatonix, Anitta, and Why Don't We. The musical score is composed by Christopher Lennertz while songs are written by Lennertz and Glenn Slater. Lennertz previously worked with Asbury on Smurfs: The Lost Village (2017), and also worked with Slater on "The Great Beyond" number from Sausage Party (2016), which Lennertz composed with Slater's collaborator, Alan Menken. The film's soundtrack was released by Atlantic Records.

Clarkson's track "Broken & Beautiful" was released on March 27, 2019, prior to the album, as the soundtrack's lead single. The Brazilian singer Anitta contributed "Ugly" to the original soundtrack in English. She also recorded two alternative versions of "Ugly", one in Spanish and one in Portuguese, for their respective markets. These versions were released prior to the release of the film and are not included in the soundtrack in these markets.

Pitbull was also slated to have an original song for the film, which was to be a parody of "You Make My Dreams" by Daryl Hall and John Oates. However, Pitbull's contributions to the song were scrapped, as he broke the fourth wall as Uglydog. Pentatonix was then given the final version of the record, which was included in the movie's soundtrack. Pitbull's original version, titled "Dreams Come True", can be found on DJ record pools for promotional use.

== Release ==
UglyDolls was initially scheduled to be released on May 10, 2019, but was later moved down a week to May 3 in order to avoid competition with Pokémon: Detective Pikachu.

The studio spent around $40 million on promotions and advertisements for the film.

=== Home media ===
UglyDolls was released on Digital HD on July 16, 2019, and on DVD and Blu-ray on July 30, 2019.

=== Additional media ===
A video game tie-in for various platforms was produced by Outright Games titled Ugly Dolls: An Imperfect Adventure, with the initial retail price being US$39.99. A variety of merchandise, including plush toys, playsets, and blind bags, was released by Hasbro featuring several characters from the movie.

== Reception ==
=== Box office ===
UglyDolls grossed $20.2 million in the United States and Canada, and $11.2 in other territories, for a worldwide total of $31.4 million.

In the United States and Canada, UglyDolls was released alongside The Intruder and Long Shot, and was projected to gross $12–14 million from 3,652 theaters in its opening weekend. The film made $2.5 million on its first day, including $300,000 from Thursday night previews. However, it underperformed in its first week, finishing fourth in box office receipts at only $8.6 million. The film fell 51.8% in its second weekend, grossing $4.1 million and finishing in seventh place.

=== Critical response ===
On the review aggregator website Rotten Tomatoes, 30% of 89 critics' reviews are positive, with an average rating of 4.4/10. The website's consensus reads: "Very young viewers may be entertained by UglyDolls -- if only because they're less likely to recognize the many familiar elements in its affirmative yet formulaic story." Metacritic, which uses a weighted average, assigned the film a score of 39 out of 100, based on 20 critics, indicating "generally unfavorable" reviews. Audiences polled by CinemaScore gave the film an average grade of "B+" on an A+ to F scale, while those at PostTrak gave it 2.5 out of 5 stars and a 51% "definite recommend".

Katie Walsh of Los Angeles Times gave it a 2 out of 4 review and wrote, "For a film about weird, colorful dolls, one hopes for something wackier, funnier, edgier. But UglyDolls is so soft - literally, the felted textures are startlingly realistic - and tame, that it feels like watching those PBS cartoons aimed at toddlers." Owen Gleiberman of Variety magazine was positive, saying that "the sincerity with which UglyDolls pits unblemished conformity against ungainly soul is touching—and, yes, instructive—in all the right ways." Jesse Hassenger of The A.V. Club gave the film a grade C− and wrote: "Like their Troll ancestors, the UglyDolls combine an evergreen cuteness with a why-now lack of currency."

=== Accolades ===
UglyDolls was awarded a ReFrame Stamp in the category "Top 100-Grossing Narrative Feature" for involving women in at least four of eight key areas of production. The song "Broken & Beautiful" was nominated in the 2019 Teen Choice Awards in the category "Choice Song from a Movie".

== Proposed television series ==
In May 2018, less than a year prior to the film's release, Hulu signed a deal with STX Entertainment to produce an animated television series based on UglyDolls, which also included VOD rights to the film. The series was meant to consist of 26 episodes per season with a projected release date of early 2020. However, due to the film's financial failure, there have been no updates on the project since.

On April 25, 2026, a series made with generative AI was launched on the film's YouTube channel, which caused controversy.
