= Parke & Ronen =

Fashion company

- Industry: Fashion
- Founded: 1997
- Founder: Ronen Jehezkel; Parke Lutter
- Headquarters: 176 Ninth Ave., New York, NY 10011
- Number of locations: New York, NY
- Area served: USA / International
- Key people: Ronen Jehezkel; Parke Lutter
- Products: High fashion retail
- Website: parkeandronen.com

Parke & Ronen is a fashion company and brand founded by fashion designers Parke Lutter and Ronen Jehezkel. Its collection includes menswear and men’s swim collection offering shirts, pants, shorts, sportswear, footwear, and accessories. The brand has its own New York and Los Angeles boutiques, but is sold in top stores in the United States and internationally.

Ronen Jehezkel attained his degree in Alta Moda from Istituto Europeo di Design in Italy. Parke Lutter graduated with a Fashion Design degree from Parsons The New School for Design.

Jehezkel had started a small business in Soho, then moved to New York and in 1991 opened a studio in Tribeca. The two met in 1993 cooperating on a line and in 1997 launched their company Parke & Ronen. It has two in-house labels. "White Label" that features casual contemporary sportswear, tee-shirts and swimwear and is sold in many stores, and the limited "Boutique Label" in their New York and Los Angeles boutiques and selective stores.
