= Nick van Woert =

Nick van Woert is an American artist from Reno, Nevada. He currently lives and works in Brooklyn, New York. He studied architecture (BArch) at the University of Oregon and Fine Arts (MFA) at Parsons the New School for Design in New York.

== Solo exhibitions ==
- 2016 Violence, Gemeentemuseum Den Haag, The Hague, NL
- 2015 Just Dropped In To See What Condition My Condition Was In, Moran Bondaroff, LA
- 2015 Pink Elephants On Parade, Sheppard Gallery, University of Nevada, Reno
- 2014 Nature Calls, MAMbo, Bologna, Italy
- 2014 Hunky Dory Honky Tonk, Grimm Gallery, Amsterdam, NL
- 2014 Pulverizer, Sheppard Gallery, University of Nevada, Reno
- 2013 Labyrinth, L&M, Los Angeles
- 2013 Haruspex, Yvon Lambert, Paris
- 2013 No Man's Land, OHWOW, Los Angeles
- 2012 Improvised Munition, Grimm Gallery, Amsterdam, NL
- 2011 Anatomy, Yvon Lambert, Paris
- 2011 Terra Amata, FIAF, New York
- 2011 Breaking And Entering, Yvon Lambert, New York
- 2010 She-Wolf, Grimm Gallery, Amsterdam, NL

== Awards and recognition ==
- Zabludowicz Collection Artist in Residence, Sarvisalo, Finland (2010)
- Parsons MFA Fine Arts Valedictorian (2007)
- ISC Outstanding Student Achievement in Contemporary Sculpture
- 31st GNMH AWARD
