= CA-Modern =

American architecture and design magazine

CA-Modern Magazine
- Editor: Marty Arbunich
- Categories: Architecture, Design, and Home Improvement
- Frequency: Quarterly
- Founded: 1993
- Company: Eichler Network
- Country: USA
- Based in: San Francisco, CA
- Language: English
- Website: www.eichlernetwork.com

CA-Modern was an American magazine devoted to mid-century modern architecture and design in California. The Fall 2023 issue was the final issue of the print magazine. The Eichler Network will continue producing its website, emailed blogs, and printed annual Home Maintenance Directory.

== About ==
CA-Modern was published by the Eichler Network, a company based in San Francisco that continues to operate a website and sends weekly e-mail news features to subscribers. It also publishes a print service directory of firms that specialize in repair and improvement of mid-century modern homes, including those built from the 1950s to 1970s by Bay Area developer Joe Eichler of Eichler Homes, Inc.

Founded in 1993 by publisher Marty Arbunich, first as a four-page letter-size, black-and-white mailer and then as a 16-page tabloid newsletter also called Eichler Network, it became a 36-page oversized color magazine in January 2006. Over the years it expanded its coverage, from its early focus exclusively on Eichler homes, with an emphasis on preservation and home improvement and maintenance, to historical articles on mid-century architecture and design, light features, nostalgia, music, etc.

The magazine was mailed free to the property addresses of Eichler homes In Northern California, as well as to other mid-century modern homes, such as select homes built by the Streng Brothers in the Sacramento and Davis areas in the Sacramento Valley.

The magazine was available by subscription (with back issues from 2006 to the present) and was not sold on newsstands. Its hundreds of articles continue to appear on the website of the Eichler Network.

Eichler Network the newsletter, originally sent only to Eichler homeowners, started a Sacramento Valley edition in 2003, directed to owners of Streng homes.

The switch in format and name from Eichler Network to CA-Modern included an increased geographic scope, adding Los Angeles, San Fernando Valley, Long Beach-Orange, and Palm Springs editions, and coincided with a broadening of the subject matter. The magazine profiled several Southern California architects, including William Krisel, Don Wexler, and Ray Kappe; ran a news briefs column; reviewed books and other media; invited contemporary architects to devise a '21st Century Eichler,' and has readers compete in a best kitchen remodel contest. In recent years the magazine's distribution returned to a Northern California focus.

The magazine featured extensive color photography and mid-century type design, and the website and email newsletters continue that tradition. The designer is Doreen Jorgensen.

In January 2012, the magazine entered the national conversation about Apple innovator Steve Jobs, who had reportedly drawn design inspiration from his childhood Eichler home. The Eichler Network's investigation showed that Jobs' home was designed by Anshen and Allen, architects who worked for Eichler, but was built by Mackay Homes."
