= Joe Ledbetter =

American artist

- Born: 1977 (age 48–49); Glendale, California
- Known for: Painter, illustrator, graphic designer, toy designer
- Website: joeledbetter.com

Joe Ledbetter (born 1977) is an American artist and art toy designer from Los Angeles (also known as JLed). He is considered part of the Pop Surrealism, Lowbrow Art Movement and Art and Designer Toys movement.

== Career ==
Joe Ledbetter His style is influenced by classic animation, underground comics, skateboarding and 1980s video games. Over the years, Ledbetter has created an cast of creatures used to anthropomorphize the human condition. With a vibrant palette, he mixes irony, social criticism and mischief.

He earned a degree in sociology from Humboldt State University in 2001, and despite his lack of formal art training, began his career as a graphic artist in the apparel industry. Working his way up from underground art shows, he's been at his craft full-time since 2004 holding art exhibitions in over 10 countries, collaborating with top brands (Nike, Swatch, Sony Music, Kidrobot), exhibiting in museum shows (Andy Warhol Museum, MADRE Museum Italy, Bristol City Museum, Riverside Art Museum), sold work at Christie's auction house in New York, and has been featured in the Los Angeles Times, People Magazine, Juxtapoz Magazine and Hi-Fructose Magazine. He is most known for his innovative and distinctive designer toys.

== Art toys ==
In 2005, Wheaty Wheat Studios produced "Mr. Bunny", the first Joe Ledbetter figure. It was released in three colorways. Mr. Bunny is now considered an icon of the vinyl art toy movement. In 2008 Mr. Bunny took part with other "most wanted" designer toys to the Christie's "Pop Culture" auction.

Over 100 toys has been created by Ledbetter, including:

- Mr Bunny (Wheaty Wheat -2005)
- Fire-Cat (Wheaty Wheat -2005)
- Ringo Bear (Wheaty Wheat -2006)
- Teeter (Kidrobot-2006/2007)
- Sluggonadon - part of the Kaiju for Grownups series (Wonderwall-2007)
- Gamerita - part of the Kaiju for Grownups series (Wonderwall-2007)
- Finders Keepers Miniseries (Kidrobot -2007)
- Hammerhead (Intheyellow-2008)
- Bummer (Fully Visual-2008)
- Smash (Toy2R-2008)
- Unicornasaurus (Kidrobot -2008)
- Slander (Play Imaginative-2009)
- Terror and Magnus (The Loyal Subjects-2009)
- Octobunny (2009)
- Magnus and Friday (The Loyal Subjects-2010)
- Pico and Wilshire (The Loyal Subjects-2010)
- Wrecks and Dazey (Analog Playset-2010)
- Chinese Zodiac (PI-2011)
- Piggy Bank (PI-2011)
- Burger Bunny - wood (The Loyal Subjects-2012)
- Burger Bunny - inflatable (The Loyal Subjects-2012)
- Chaos Bunnies series (The Loyal Subject-2012,2013)
Mr. Bunny 2012

== Works & collaborations ==
Ledbetter collaborated on several projects with Nike, Ride Snowboards, Sony Music, GAMA-GO, Ford Motor Company, Last Gasp Press, Dark Horse and his visuals of his art has been published in the Los Angeles Times, People, Hi-fructose, Juxtapoz, DPI, and Playtimes.

Ledbetter's art has been featured in museum shows, including The Andy Warhol Museum, MADRE Museum of Contemporary Art of Naples, Bristol City Museum and Art Gallery, and Riverside Art Museum.

In 2010 he created the entire art for the Motion City Soundtrack album My Dinosaur Life.

== Publications ==
- Creatures of Habit: The Art of Joe Ledbetter, Last Gasp press, 2009 (ISBN 978-0867197181)
- Joe Ledbetter's Sketchbook, Nerdcore, 2008 (ISBN 978-0-9800924-5-5)
- I Am Plastic: The Designer Toys Explosion, Paul Budnitz, Abrams, 2006 (ISBN 978-0810958463)
- Toygiants, Daniel & Geo Fuchs, Selim Varol, 2007 (ISBN 978-1584232841)
- I Am Plastic Too: The Next Generation of Designer Toys, Paul Budnitz, Abrams, 2010 (ISBN 978-0810988873)
- Art-Toys: Photographs by Brian McCarty, Brian McCarty, Tattoo Books, 2010 (ISBN 978-0979330766)
