= Mitchell Johnson (artist) =

American contemporary artist (born 1964)

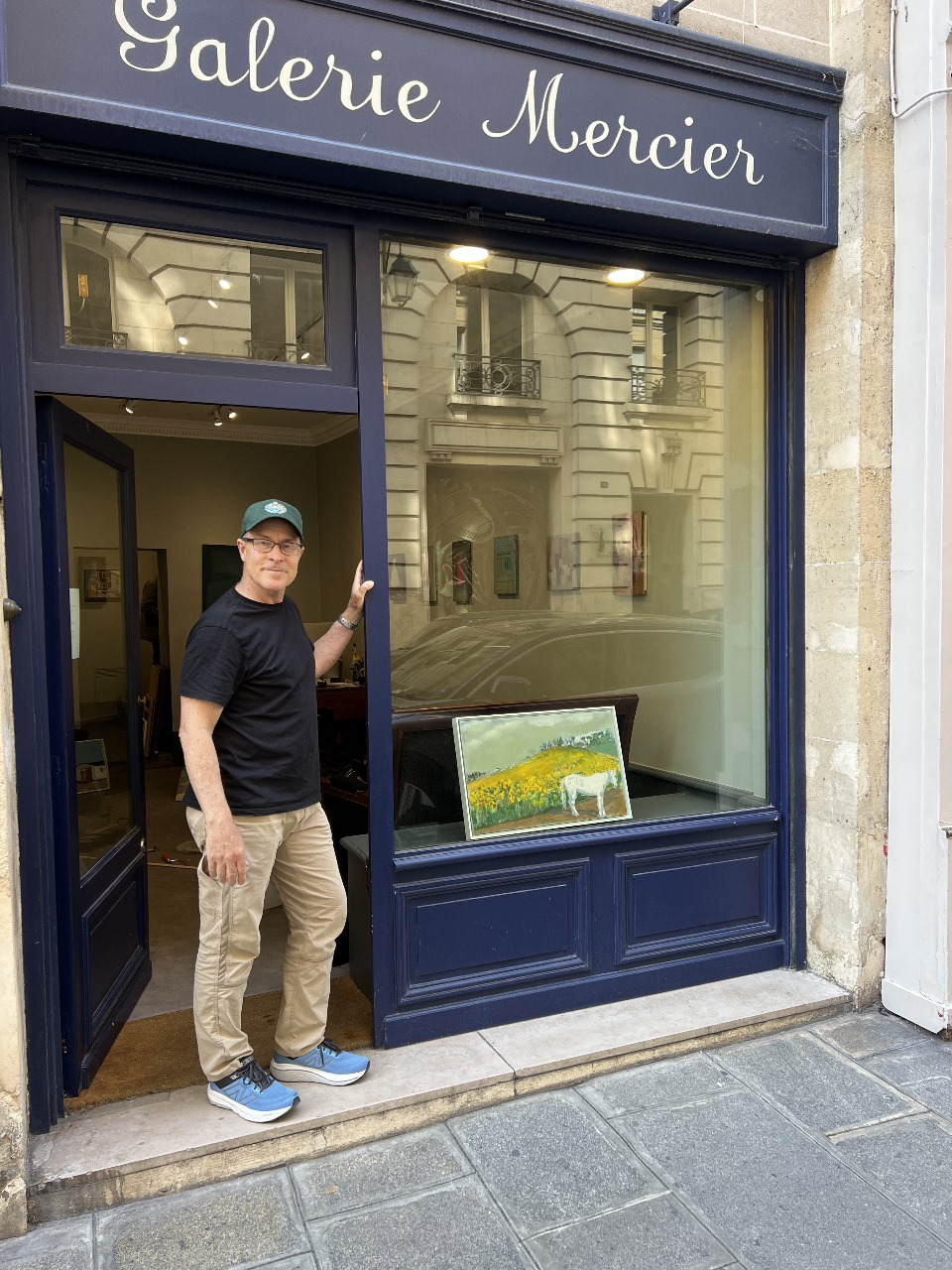
- Born: 1964 (age 61–62); Rock Hill, South Carolina, U.S.
- Education: Parsons School of Design; Randolph–Macon College
- Occupation: Painter

Mitchell Johnson (born 1964) is an American contemporary artist. Johnson is known as a colorist. His paintings often depict landscapes, architecture, and urban scenes inspired by his home in the San Francisco Bay Area and annual trips to Europe and New England.

== Early life and education ==
Johnson was born in Rock Hill, South Carolina, and grew up in New York and Virginia. He studied painting at Staten Island Academy and earned a Bachelor of Science degree in computer science from Randolph-Macon College in 1986, where he also studied painting, drawing, and art history with painter Raymond Berry. From 1987 to 1988 he attended the Washington Studio School in Washington, D.C. and later he completed a Master of Fine Arts at Parsons School of Design in 1990.

== Artistic career ==
In 1990 Johnson moved to San Francisco and worked as a studio assistant to Sam Francis. While working for Francis, he also continued painting independently both outdoors and in his Palo Alto garage. In 2007 he was the artist-in-residence at the Josef and Anni Albers Foundation in Bethany, Connecticut.

Johnson has held solo exhibitions in the United States and Europe, including Color as Content: A 25-Year Survey at the Bakersfield Museum of Art in 2015, Color Continuum at the Pamela Walsh Gallery in Palo Alto in 2021, La révélation de Meyreuil at the Musée Villa les Camélias in Cap d’Ail in 2024, Small Paintings at Galerie Mercier in Paris (May 2025), and Twenty Years in Truro (Selected Paintings 1989–2025) at the Truro Center for the Arts at Castle Hill in Massachusetts in 2025, and Mitchell Johnson: Personal Color (Selected Paintings 1988–2026) at Galerie Mercier in Paris in 2026.

His work has also appeared in group exhibitions, including Spectral Hues: Artists + Color at the Palo Alto Art Center in 2017, All in Favor: New Works in the Permanent Collection at the Tampa Museum of Art from 2022 to 2023, Recent Acquisitions: A CCMoA Permanent Collection Exhibition at the Cape Cod Museum of Art in 2025 , and the Summer Party Exhibition at The Glass House in New Canaan, Connecticut (June 2025).

His paintings are held in museum collections, including the Virginia Museum of Fine Arts, Kemper Museum of Contemporary Art, New Britain Museum of American Art, Tucson Museum of Art, Ogunquit Museum of American Art, Crocker Art Museum, and the Cape Cod Museum of Art. His paintings have been used by the U.S. State Department’s Art in Embassies program. Johnson’s paintings have appeared in films including The Holiday (2006), It’s Complicated (2009), Crazy, Stupid, Love (2011) and The Family McMullen (2025).

Johnson teaches a master color class at Truro Center for the Arts at Castle Hill since 2019. Castle Hill will host his 2026 exhibition, Twenty One Years in Truro, September 8-20, 2026.

The Triton Museum of Art in Santa Clara, California, is scheduled to hold Mitchell Johnson: Fifty Years of Painting from January 16 to April 18, 2027, a retrospective of 70 paintings spanning six decades. As of 2026, he also teaches a color theory workshop at the Art Students League of New York.

After working within the traditional gallery system for twenty-five years, Johnson began working independently in 2012, promoting his paintings through print advertising in publications including Artforum, The New York Times Magazine, The New Yorker and The Wall Street Journal

== Personal life ==
Johnson is married to Iranian-American author/chef, Donia Bijan.
