= Giant Robot (magazine) =

Bimonthly Asian-American culture magazine

- Issue #41
- Editor: Eric Nakamura, Martin Wong
- Categories: Popular culture
- Company: Giant Robot
- Country: United States
- Based in: California
- Language: English
- Website: giantrobot.com

Giant Robot is a website and former bimonthly magazine focusing on Asian and Asian American popular culture, founded in Southern California in 1994. It was one of the earliest American publications to feature prominent Asian film stars such as Chow Yun-fat and Jet Li, as well as Asian musicians from indie and punk rock bands. Its coverage later expanded into art, design, Asian-American issues, travel, and much more.

== Publication history ==
Eric Nakamura (BA '93) and Martin Wong (BA '90) had met when they were both undergraduate students at the University of California, Los Angeles (UCLA), where they bonded over their shared interest in punk music and Asian pop culture. Giant Robot, named after the Japanese TV series Giant Robo, was initially created as a small, punk-minded magazine that featured Asian pop culture and Asian-American alternative culture, including such varied subject matter as history, art, music, film, books, toys, technology, food, and skateboarding. The publication grew from its original format—a small, photocopied zine, folded and stapled by hand—to its eventual full-color format. In the early days, Wong and Nakamura independently approached bookstores and music shops to ask if they would carry the magazine.

In 2003, the magazine could be found at Barnes & Noble, Tower Records, Virgin Store, Borders, and UCLA Ackerman Union, amongst other location. In 2004, there were 60,000 copies in circulation annually.

Giant Robot briefly had an in-magazine zine insert titled Giant Power.

Nakamura and Wong are featured on the DVD release of the collection of animated short films The Animatrix, discussing anime in the Making of the Animatrix documentary.

The last issue of the magazine, #68, was released in February 2011, featuring the work of Luke Chueh on the cover.

Also in 2011, Giant Robot launched its new website and updated content, including articles, video, and products daily.

== Giant Robot store ==
Tired of always redirecting customers to third-party sellers for items that they featured in the magazine, they began a mail-order service to sell those Asian products directly to the readers. In the late 1990s, Giant Robot expanded its endeavor to an online retail store, selling artist goods, designer vinyl dolls, minifigures, plush dolls, stationeries, art, T-shirts, and many creative goods.

The success of the commercial website enabled the establishment of a brick-and-mortar retail store in 2001, first in Los Angeles and later in San Francisco. A third store, called GR2, was opened in Los Angeles, and features work by young contemporary artists. Giant Robot further expanded to a fourth store in New York City, and a fifth in Silverlake. The GR2, San Francisco, and New York locations feature monthly art exhibitions from up-and-coming and established artists.

As of 2009, the Silverlake store has closed. The New York store closed in 2010 and the San Francisco store closed in 2011. Giant Robot had an association with Lost Weekend Video in the Mission District of San Francisco, where they opened a pop-up shop; Lost Weekend Video closed in 2018. As of 2024, GR2 Gallery and the Giant Robot Store are located in Los Angeles.

Their first art show featured works by artist David Choe.

== Giant Robot events ==
In 2007, Giant Robot published its 50th issue and celebrated with an art exhibition at the Japanese American National Museum titled, "Giant Robot Biennale: 50 Issues." Subsequent exhibitions took place at the museum in 2009, 2012, 2015, and 2024.

In 2010, Giant Robot presented Zen Garage at the Japanese American National Museum featuring the Scion xb Famicom Car designed by Nakamura.

On September 22, 2012, Nakamura curated Giant Robot Biennale 3 at the Japanese American National Museum. The opening night brought in over 1500 people. The exhibition features the works of Rob Sato, Deth P. Sun, Ako Castuera, Eishi Takaoka, Saelee Oh, Sean Chao, Albert Reyes, and Zach Gage. Using figures designed by Uglydoll creator David Horvath, Nakamura curated Project Remix, a custom vinyl show with over 80 artists from seven countries—including the rare combination of both established customizers and fine artists. Special additions to the exhibition include an original piece from Japanese painter Masakatsu Sashie, as well as arcade machines running Jeni Yang and Beau Blyth's new indie video game, Catburger.

On April 19, 2014, Eric Nakamura and Carin Adams curated SuperAwesome: Art and Giant Robot at Oakland Museum of California. Artists Included: Ako Castuera, Sean Chao, David Choe, Luke Chueh, Hamburger Eyes, Andrew Hem, James Jean, Kozyndan, Masakatsu Sashie, Shizu Saldamando, Rob Sato, Amy Sol, Deth P Sun, and Adrian Tomine. The exhibition ran until June 27, 2014.

On April 18, 2015, Eric Nakamura curated Samurai! at Worcester Art Museum in Worcester, Massachusetts. The exhibition features samurai armor and contemporary art. Artists include: Murals by Andrew Hem, Mari Inukai, and Audrey Kawasaki. On view: Miya Ando, Esao Andrews, Shawn Cheng, Josh Cochran, Moira Hahn, Jed Henry, James Jean, kozyndan, Mu Pan, Ferris Plock, Stan Sakai, Masakatsu Sashie, Rob Sato, Yuko Shimizu, Katsuya Terada, and Kent Williams. The exhibition ran until September 6, 2015.

In November 2024, the UCLA Film & Television Archive and the Yanai Initiative for Globalizing Japanese Humanities at UCLA hosted a film festival marking the 30th anniversary of the founding of Giant Robot. Co-curated by Nakamura, it was called "A Film Series for You: Celebrating Giant Robot's 30th Anniversary" and included screenings of films Nakamura felt represented facets of Giant Robot, such as Tekkonkinkreet, Gamera: Guardian of the Universe, and Chungking Express.
