= Luke Chueh =

American painter

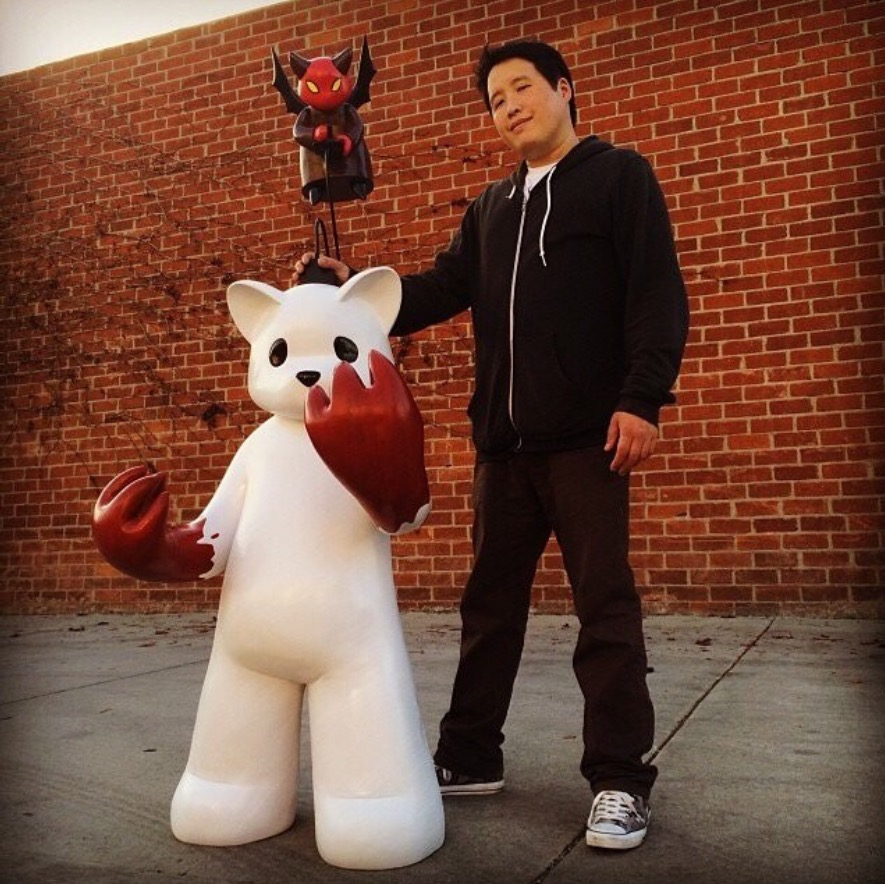
- Chueh with his 4ft Possessed sculpture (2014)
- Born: March 7, 1973 (age 53); Philadelphia, Pennsylvania, United States
- Education: California Polytechnic State University
- Occupation: Artist
- Years active: 2003–present
- Known for: Painting, drawing, graphic design, sculpture
- Notable work: I Asked For Scrambled (2003); Black In White (2004); Possessed (2004); The Prisoner (2005); Bear In Mind (2006)
- Movement: Lowbrow, designer toy
- Website: lukechueh.com

Luke Chueh (/ˈtʃuː/; born March 7, 1973) is a Chinese-American lowbrow, pop surrealist, painter. His works is a juxtaposition of the cute with the macabre, including various self-portraits reimagining himself as a bear character.

Born to Chinese immigrants in Philadelphia, Pennsylvania, the family relocated to Fresno, California soon afterwards. Taught illustration at a young age, he became obsessed with interpreting the popular culture imagery he was surrounded by. Trained as graphic designer at California Polytechnic State University in San Luis Obispo, he was hired as an in-house designer & illustrator at the Ernie Ball Company in 1997.

In 2003, Chueh relocated to Los Angeles and started pursuing a career as a painter. He hasn't had to take a day job since.

== Life ==
Luke Chueh was born on March 7, 1973, and is a first generation Chinese-American; his parents having immigrated to the United States from China. When he was three months old, Chueh's family relocated from Philadelphia, Pennsylvania to Fresno, California. At the age of four, his mother taught him how to draw Mickey Mouse, which began a childhood obsession to paint and illustrate renditions of his favorite things, mainly Star Wars and other "science fiction stuff that I was watching all the time."

After graduating from Clovis West High School in 1991, the 18-year-old enrolled into the Art & Design program at California Polytechnic State University in San Luis Obispo. Nearing the completion of his degree, one his professors confided in Chueh that he was "a mediocre graphic designer", but that he was "a good illustrator" and "should pursue a career in that", despite the fact that Chueh had a graphic design concentration and his formal art training was restricted to a "couple quarters of Life Drawing and Illustrations classes".

Hired by the Ernie Ball Company as an in-house designer & illustrator before graduation, Chueh primarily created T-shirt and advertisement designs for the brand. Several of these became award-winning, with the artist himself being featured in the 1998 design annuals of both Communication Arts and Print.

During this time, Chueh began spending his nights partying to excess, leading to him being fired from the company. In 2003 he relocated to Los Angeles.

After moving to LA, Chueh kickstarted a career as a studio artist. However, he soon fell into addiction, his artwork, from that time, mirroring his struggles. In 2010, Chueh was finally able find sobriety, and is an advocate for people struggling with substance abuse.

== Style and works ==
"Bear in Mind" (2006)

His images have been praised for their juxtaposition of cuteness with the macabre. "Traditionally, the sublime is described as the beautiful tinged with pain," said Steppling gallery director Sheila Dollente. "Chueh pares that idea to a single spare image borne by figures reminiscent of the soft, innocent stuffed animals of childhood. His paintings are at once intriguing, puzzling, friendly and sorrowful." His paintings and illustrations are noted for bringing together influences as diverse as Mark Rothko and Sanrio.

Chueh draws inspiration from deeply personal experiences and pop culture, and has created works that stem from the intolerance he experiences as a Chinese-American.

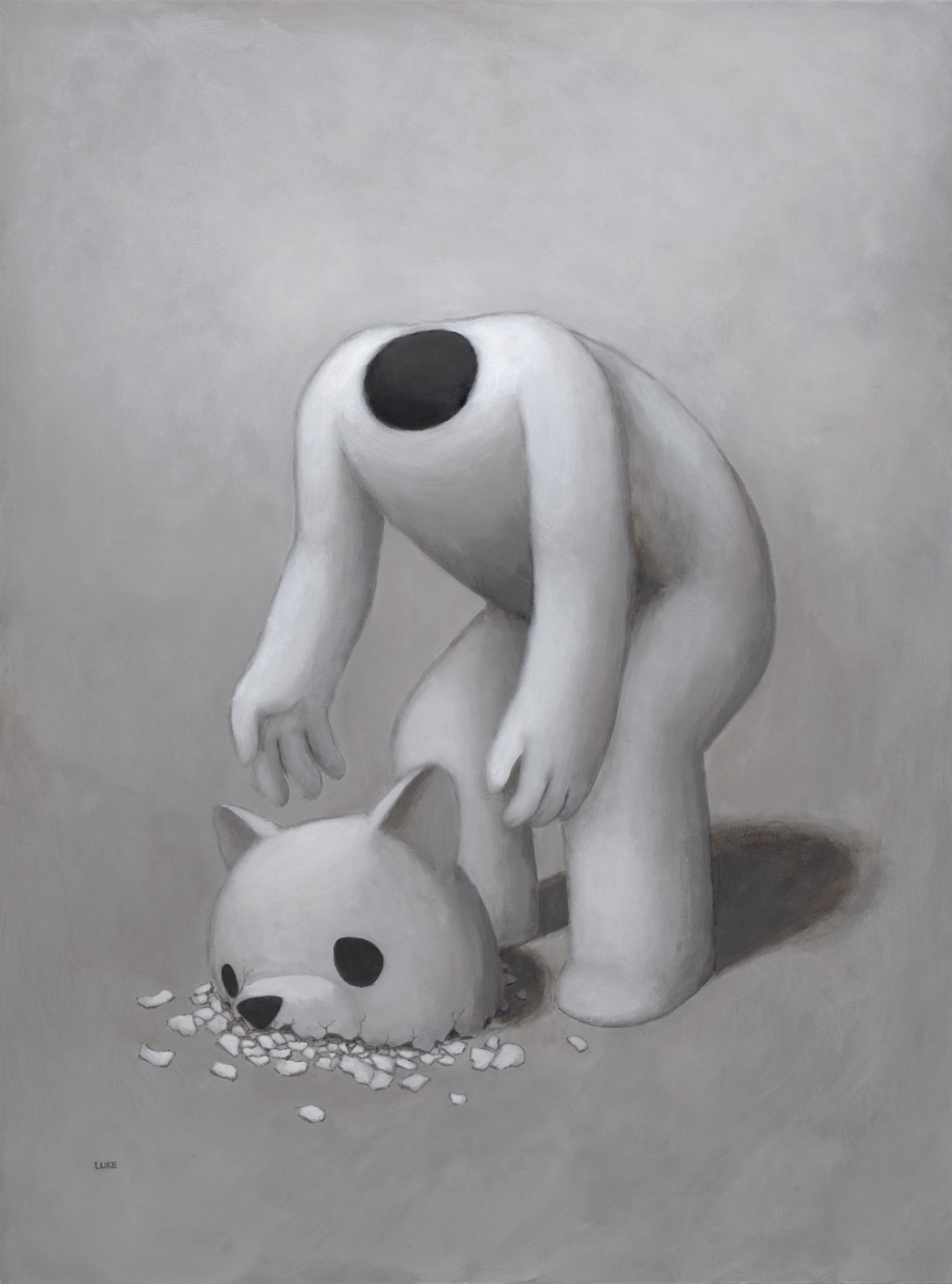
"Picking Up The Pieces" (2021)

In 2008 he designed the cover artwork for Fall Out Boy's album Folie à Deux (2008).

In 2011, Gallery 1988 published his first retrospective coffee table book, "Bearing the Unbearable".

Over the years, Chueh's drug-addled bloody bear paintings have evolved. The newer themes are race, consumerism, isolation, and mortality in an approachable and often comedic way.

Luke Chueh's art has been shown at galleries and museums in the U.S., Europe, Asia, and Australia. His most recent solo exhibition, "Peering Through The Darkness" (2023) sold out at Corey Helford Gallery, Los Angeles.

== Projects and media ==
In 2007, Munky King Toys released his first of many art toys, "Possessed". Based on the painting of the same name, the figure has been celebrated in the art/designer toy community. Other companies Chueh has collaborated with include Strange Co., In The Yellow, Kidrobot, Mighty Jaxx, and Flabslab. In 2023, Chueh began self producing his own art toy, "Low Fidelity", a figure inspired by his love of Lo/Fi Music.

In 2018, Chueh teamed up with Giant Robot (magazine) founder Eric Nakamura and launched their Art & Culture podcast "Robot and the Bear".
