= GAMA-GO =

GAMA–GO
- Company type: Housewares, gifts, apparel, toys, accessories
- Founded: 2001, San Francisco, California, U.S.
- Headquarters: San Francisco, California, U.S.
- Key people: Chris Edmundson (2001–present); Greg Long (2001–2017); Tim Biskup (2001–2006)

GAMA–GO (or GAMAGO) is a retail company founded in 2001 in San Francisco, California by Greg Long, Chris Edmundson, and Tim Biskup. The company sells housewares, gifts, apparel, toys, and accessories. In June 2017, the company was acquired by NMR America.

== History ==
The group began silkscreening t-shirts with artwork from their friends in Long’s San Francisco garage. They wanted to help promote the San Francisco art scene and distract from their day jobs. Shortly after starting, one of Long’s friends, artist Tim Biskup joined them, and printed shirts with Biskup’s "Gama-Goon" character. The three of them together took the basement hobby and turned it into a company. They acquired a storefront in the SOMA neighborhood in San Francisco in 2005, and by 2015 the storefront closed. In 2006, Tim Biskup ceased his creative involvement with the company.

In 2006, GAMA–GO shifted their focus from apparel to gifts for the home and kitchen. 2009 saw the release of The Flipper, a guitar shaped spatula. The success of The Flipper helped to cement GAMA–GO's name among the top gift-ware design companies. GAMA–GO products are available in 3000+ stores internationally.

In June 2017 the company was acquired by NMR America and Greg Long exited. He next co-founded the consumer cannabis brand, Murmmr. Chris Edmundson remains the creative director of the GAMA–GO brand.
