= Dimitar Lukanov =

Bulgarian-American artist

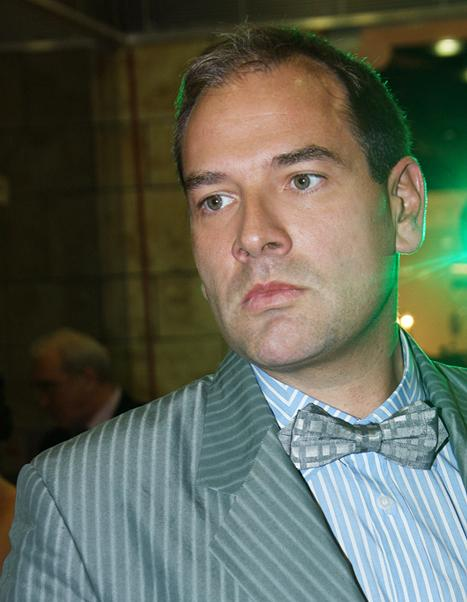
- Dimitar Lukanov
- Born: Dimitar Lukanov; February 23, 1969; Plovdiv, Bulgaria
- Died: October 15, 2023 (aged 54); Sofia, Bulgaria
- Education: Columbia University, New York, United States
- Known for: Artist sculptor
- Website: http://www.dimitarlukanov.com

Dimitar Lukanov (Bulgarian: Димитър Луканов) (February 23, 1969 – October 15, 2023) was a Bulgarian-American artist.

== Early life and art education ==
Dimitar Lukanov was born in Plovdiv, Bulgaria in 1969.

In 1982 Dimitar Lukanov chaired the World's Children Parliament in the Nicholas Roerich-inspired International Assembly "Banner of Peace" in Sofia with 135 countries participating.

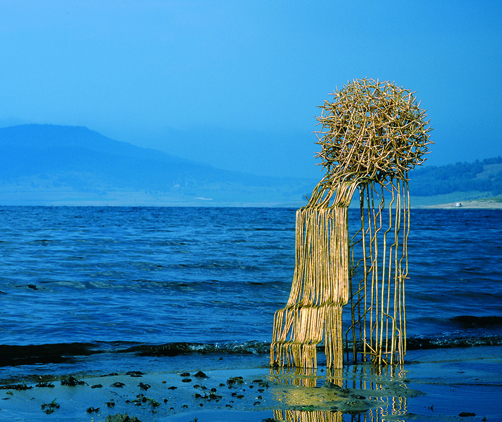
Waterfall of the Sun 2003, bronze, lost-wax

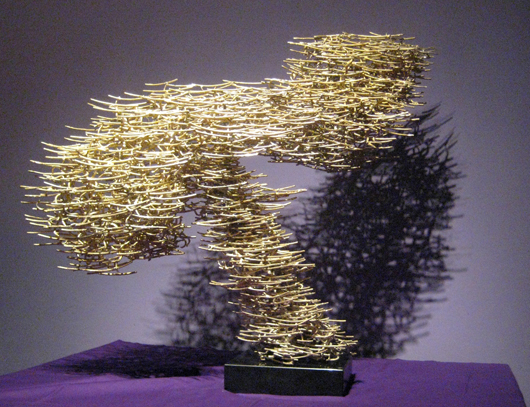
Silent Wave 2007, bronze, lost-wax, Shanghai, China

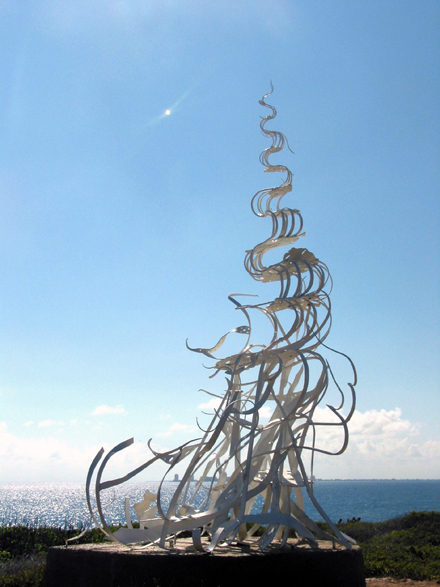
Salto de Agua 2001, steel, 15 feet Isla Mujeres Sculpture park, Mexico

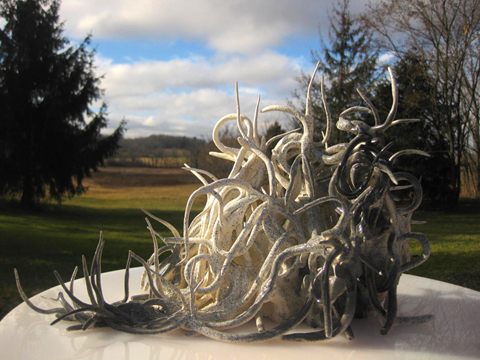
Balance of Gray 2012, fired clay/glaze

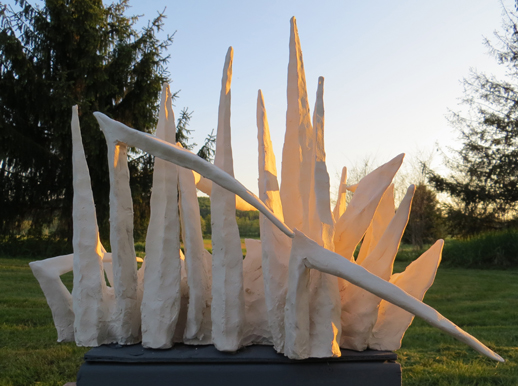
White Fire 2012, fired clay

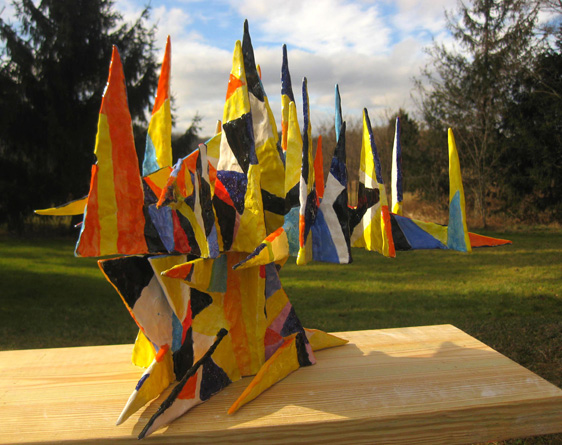
Mountain of Colors 2012, fired clay/glaze

He began his studies at the art school of his hometown, worked in a foundry of bronze in Sofia and studied for a year at the Hudojestvena Akademija. In 1991 he left on a full scholarship to continue his studies in Paris.

He attended École Parsons in Paris France (1991–93), graduating at the top of the class with honors from Parsons School of Design, New York City (BFA, honors, 1994). In 2003 Dimitar was selected among the Top 100 alumni of all times of the 90-year-old Parsons The New School University of Design among the likes of Jasper Johns, Edward Hopper, Norman Rockwell, Donna Karan, Marc Jacobs and others. His studies were fully funded by an Helene David-Weill Scholarship.

Dimitar was awarded full scholarship to the Skowhegan School of Painting and Sculpture, Maine, USA (1995), and Columbia University Scholarship for his graduate studies at School of the Arts, Columbia University, New York City (MFA, 1997).

=== Teaching ===
During the period between 1998 and 2006 Dimitar was a visiting professor and guest lecturer in the United States, France, Mexico, and the Dominican Republic. He taught various visual art classes at Parsons' New York campus and led courses in "Intensive Painting and Drawing" for Parsons School of Design in Paris in 1999, 2000 and 2001. In 2014 he was a guest lecturer and critic at the graduate program of Herberger Institute for Design and the Arts at Arizona State University. Lukanov also collaborated on various arts-in-education projects in New York. He was a consultant visual artist doing sculpture and painting murals with NYC Department of Education Special Programs and his students' work was exhibited at the Staten Island Children's Museum.

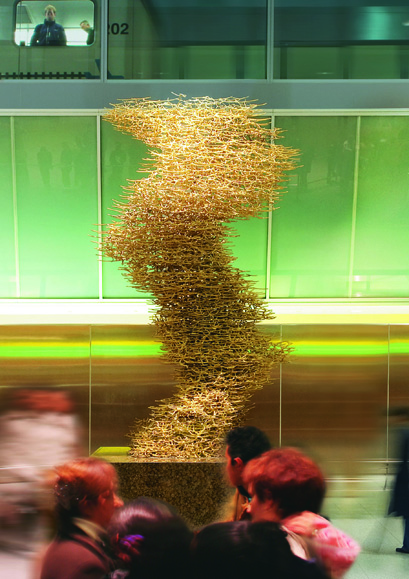
Light to Sky 2006, 15 ft, lost lost-wax cast JFK-IAT Terminal 4 Arrivals, New York

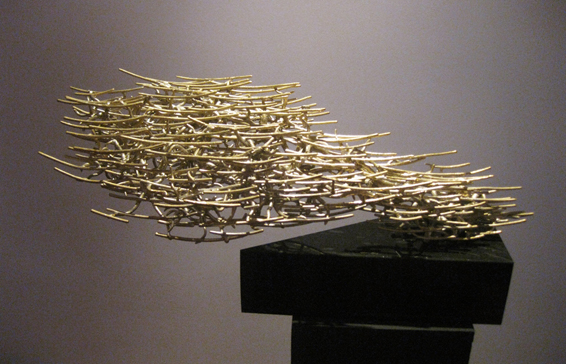
Balance of Time 2012, bronze singular lost-wax cast with no welding

== Activities ==
Created the monumental sculpture "Outside Time" for renovated JFK's Terminal 4. The signature piece is the core part of a three-work public sculpture project, commissioned to Lukanov by JFK IAT in December 2012. The piece is 90% airborne even if it is significantly inclined. The steel and aluminum sculptural work is comprised by some 600 elements as well as 1000 ft of tubing, all hand-bent and assembled by the author.

Commissioned and executed in the lost-wax technique in 2006, "Light to Sky" is a major public art sculpture project at International Arrivals, Terminal 4, at Kennedy Airport, New York. "Light to Sky" is at the top of the annual editorial review of leading US magazine "Art in America" for the 20 most important public art projects in the United States for 2006.

Dimitar Lukanov was awarded Pollock-Krasner Foundation grant for 2011.

2007 – "Silent Wave" inaugurates Yue-Sai Kan lifestyle gallery project "House of Yue-Sai" in Shanghai.

In 2006 and 2007 Dimitar was an invited guest-artist by ArtCultureStudio, Geneva, for the Moscow World Art Fair at the Manezh.

Dimitar Lukanov was a member of the Chilean Association of Painters and Sculptors, Santiago, Chile (since 2010).

== Selected exhibitions ==
- 2018-9: Three sculptures, MVGO pedestrian bridge, Amsterdam, NY
- 2010: L'Heritage International Gallery, Moscow 2008: Izbrannoe Gallery, Moscow, Russia
- 2008: Silent Wave, House of Yue-Sai Kan commission, Shanghai, China
- 2006: Light to Sky, sculpture commission, permanent installation, International Air terminal, Terminal 4, John F. Kennedy International Airport, New York
- 2006-7: Moscow International Art Exhibition, Manezh, galerie George de Bartha, Geneva
- 2007: Sculpture, Maison d'Art, Monte Carlo
- 2006: Shanghai International Art Festival Exhibition, Shanghai, China
- 2006-7: Art Loves Design, Sculpture exhibit, NiBa Home, Miami, FL
- 2005: Hodgell Gallery, Sarasota, Forecast Gallery; Holly Hunt, Miami, FL
- 2005: Lo River Arts Gallery, Beacon, NY
- 2003: Sculpture at Ordway, Sculpture/Prints, Washington DC
- 2002: Firewind, Galerie Hopkins & Custot, Paris, France
- 2001: Transparent Volcano, Sculpture, Olivier Mousson Artpluriel, Paris,
- 2001: Salto de Agua, International Sculptural Garden Punta Sur, Isla Mujeres, (permanent installation, Mexican Government commission);
- 2001: Invited Artist, festival de Arte, Expresarte, Mexico City, Mexico
- 2000: Storms, Sculpture, Drawing, Painting, Axel Raben Gallery, New York
- 2000: New Outlooks, New Jersey Center for Visual Arts, Summit, NJ
- 1999: Conversation with Mountains, International Art House Lilia Yakov, Plovdiv
- 1998: Holzhausen Sculptural Park Concept, Neiheim, Germany
- 1998: Sculptural Vectors, York College Art Gallery, Jamaica, Queens, NY
- 1997: Four Invited Artists, Casa de Chavon, Casa de Campo, Dominican Rep.
- 1997: Museo Arquelogico, Altos de Chavon, Casa de Campo, Domini. Rep.
- 1997: WorkSurface Exhibit, American Institute of Architecture, Chicago, IL
- 1996: Lithographs & Other Prints, Maison Francaise, Columbia University, New York

== Additional references ==
- Where a Sculptor Goes to Develop Ideas, Wall Street Journal, June 11, 2015
- Atlanta Office of Cultural Affairs | Dimitar Lukanov
- Iowa Arts Council, Iowa Art in State Buildings Program
- Dimitar Lukanov Sculptures Take Flight at JFK, HamptonsArtHub, 5/1/2014
- This Sculpture Suspends Time And Space At JFK Airport by Sarah Fernandez, Puddingstone Post, 2/28/2014
- JFK Adds New Work of Public Art by Dimitar Lukanov Quest Magazine, 3/27/201
- "Outside Time" A Sculpture Made to Alleviate Stress at JFK Airport’s Terminal 4, by Christopher Inoa, Untappedcities.com, 02/27/2014
- A NYC Art Installation You Have To Actually Be Leaving The City To See, Artiholics, 2/26/2014
- The Moodie Report JFK Airport Terminal 4 marks record year with 17 million travelers, Published: 08/01/15 Source: ©The Moodie Report By Elly Glendenning
- New Installation at JFK’s Terminal 4 Floats Weightlessly in Air, archpaper.com ART, East, Thursday, March 13, 2014 by Henry Melcher
- Металлический воздух Димитара Луканова в аэропорту Джона Кеннеди, Russian Design Hub, March 5, 2014 by Анжелина Вин
- Interior Design China, May 24, 2007
- Art at Airports: Kill Time Viewing Famous and Local Art SeatMaestro, 5/3/2015
- World famous artist visits PS 20 to work with parents and students, May 11, 2015
- Apech.es.tl
- Blog.sina.com
- Blog.sina.com
- New York Daily News, January 15, 2006
- Art in America Magazine, Annual 2006–2007 Museums Galleries Artists, No. 7, Editorial Public Art page 56
- Frame Magazine, China, No. 7, 2009, Editorial Profile, Pages 162 – 175
- Interior Design, China, No. 3, 2007, Pages 96 – 98
- Elle декор россия, май 2007, Persona Elle Decor, Pages 64 – 66
- Casa & Estilo Internacional Magazine, Abril/Mayo 2006, Editorial C&E Arte, Page 36, Miami, FL
- Shanghai Art Fair Catalog May 2006, Maison d'Art Monaco, Shanghai, China
- Mениджър Magazine, No. 1(135), Cофия, януари 2010
- вестник Cтандарт, Cофия, брой 4806, 26 Maй 2006, интервю
