= Eric Nakamura =

Japanese-American publisher & gallerist

Eric Nakamura is a Japanese American magazine publisher, gallerist, and entrepreneur. He is the co-founder of Giant Robot, owner of the Giant Robot store and GR2 Gallery, and curator of the Giant Robot Biennale and other museum exhibitions.

== Early life and education ==
Publisher Nakamura grew up in the Sawtelle, Los Angeles area. He attended Palisades High School and later Santa Monica College, where he'd work with the Palisadian-Post as their only photographer.

Nakamura attended UCLA, graduating in 1993 with a degree in East Asian Studies.

== Career ==
After graduation, Nakamura worked at VideoGames & Computer Entertainment shortly before starting Giant Robot.

In 1994, he founded Giant Robot, which began as a self-published magazine and grew into a widely circulated bi-monthly magazine about Asian pop culture. In 2001, he opened the first Giant Robot store in Los Angeles. The magazine ceased publication in February 2011, but Nakamura continued publication through the curation of several Giant Robot Biennale exhibitions at the Japanese American National Museum, and the SuperAwesome: Art and Giant Robot exhibition at the Oakland Museum of California.

Nakamura opened Asian fusion restaurant gr/eats in 2005. It had an almost seven year run in Sawtelle, Los Angeles, right by their physical Giant Robot store.

In 2024, Nakamura would be a recipient of the Inkpot Award at the annual San Diego Comic Con.
