= David Horvath =

American writer (born 1971)

David Z. Horvath
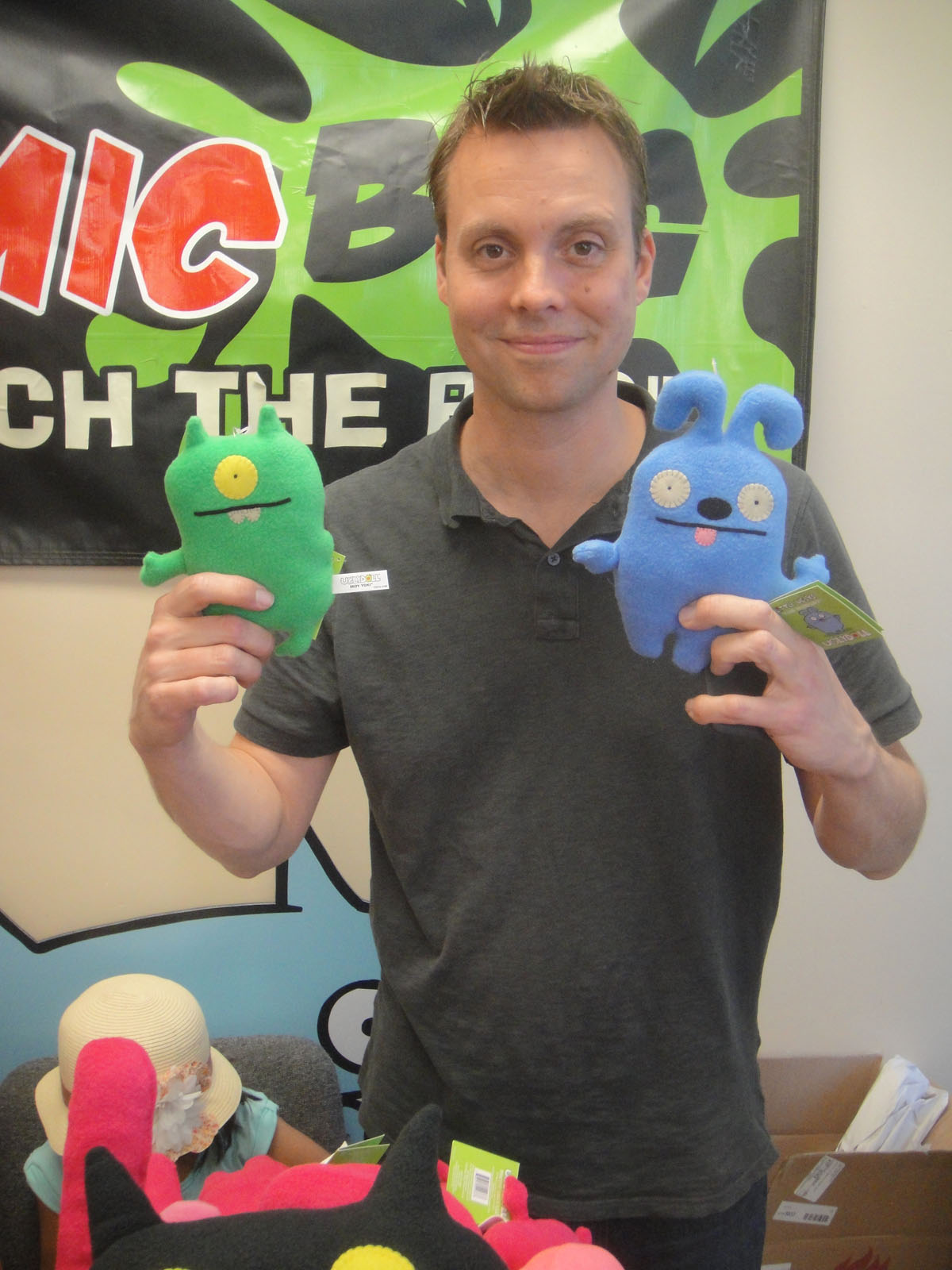
- Born: May 28, 1971 (age 55)
- Occupations: Author; Illustrator
- Known for: Uglydolls
- Spouse: Sun-Min Kim

David Z. Horvath (May 28, 1971) is an American illustrator, comics artist, toy designer and author best known for creating the popular Uglydoll characters as well as the world they inhabit, The Uglyverse, with his wife, Sun-Min Kim. The toy line began in 2001 with a single plush toy called Wage, hand sewn by his romantic and creative partner, Sun-Min Kim for David as a gift, and grew into the brand.

Kim and Horvath were later married. Today they live in Los Angeles and have two kids: a daughter and a son.

Along with a plush Uglydoll line, he is also the author and illustrator of 12 Uglydoll books, including the four "Ugly Guides" and a series of comic books, and the Bossy Bear series of children’s books. His books have been reprinted in Korean, Japanese, and Spanish.

== Education ==
Horvath attended Parsons: The New School For Design.

== Characters ==
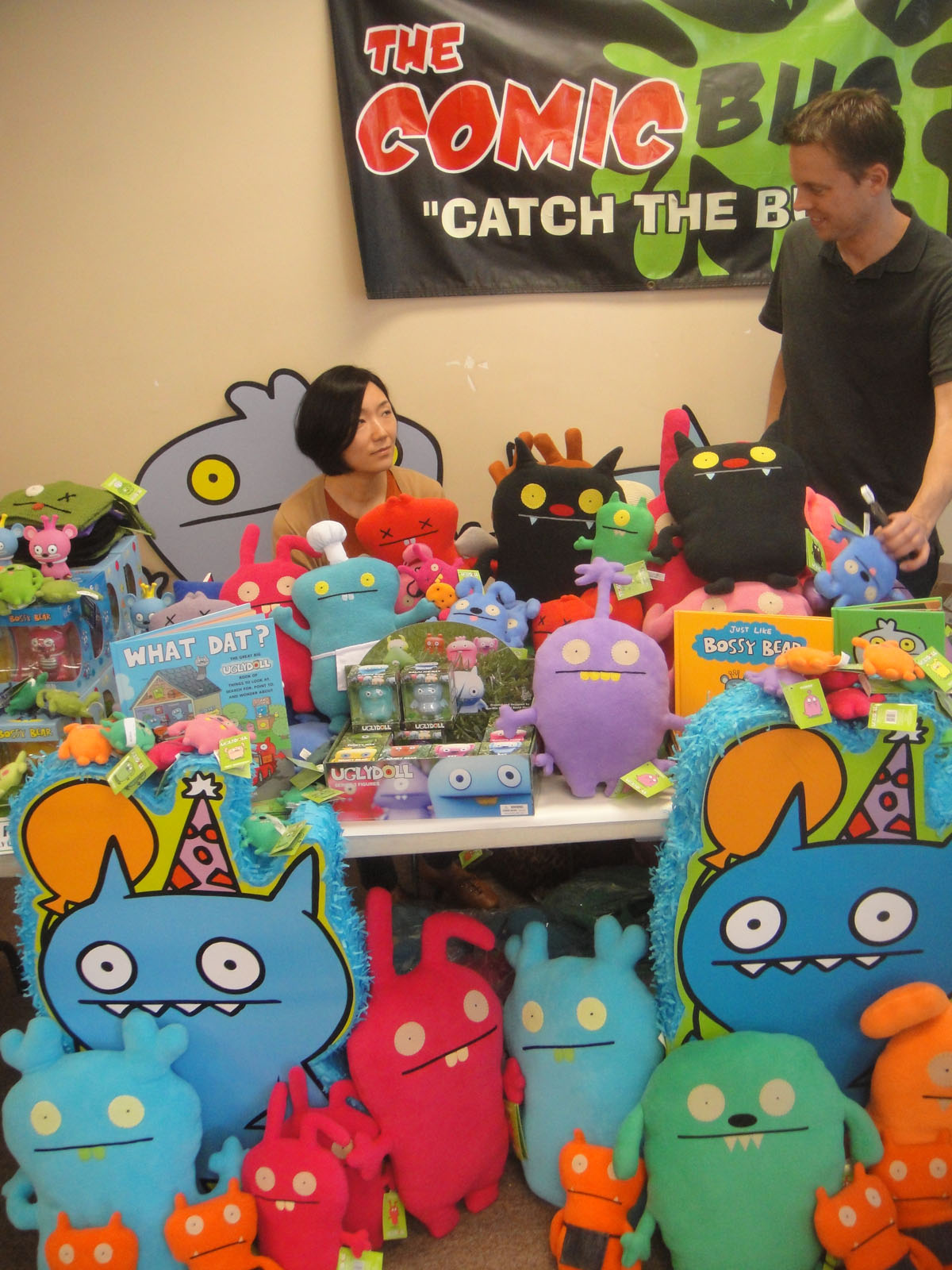
Sun-Min Kim and David Horvath, at the 2012 Free Comic Book Day

David Horvath and Sun-Min Kim are the creators of multiple characters and toy lines including:

- Uglydolls
- Bossy Bear, Bissy Bear, and Turtle
- Crocadoca
- Noupa
- Littlebony
- Choco and Minty
- Roller the Reindeer
- Dunnys with Kidrobot
- Kaiju including:

Mothman
Flatwoods
Chupacabra
Uma
Wage
Ice-Bat

- Super Puncher
- Power Mister
- Pounda and Chu Chu
- My Friend Dave

Noupa is a heroic garbage man who organizes a small underground movement against the evils of Super 7.5 robots in a struggle of nature VS commerce. The Noupa world includes 21 characters. In the early 2000s, Flying Cat produced these 21 characters as vinyl figures which were distributed by Critterbox. Five of the figures were limited releases exclusive to toy shows. Collectors refer to the entire series of characters as "Noupa." The couple also has the intellectual property of Spider Boom, although the latter is a solo project by Kim.

== Adaptations ==
An UglyDolls animated film was released by STX Entertainment on May 3, 2019. The film received negative reviews.

== Bossy Bear TV series ==
In March 2022, a children's 2D-animated series titled Bossy Bear was announced for Nickelodeon. Aimed at preschoolers, the series premiered on March 6, 2023 with an initial 30 episode order.

== Awards ==
- Toy Of The Year Award by Toy Industry Association
- Oppenheim Best Toy Award
- Parent's Choice Approved Award

== Publications ==
- How to Draw Ugly (2006) ISBN 9781560109914
- Bossy Bear (2007) ISBN 9781423103363
- The UglyDoll Ugly Guide #1: To the Uglyverse (2008) ISBN 9780375842757
- The UglyDoll Ugly Guide #2: To Things That Go and Things That Should Go But Don't (2008) ISBN 978-0375843709
- The UglyDoll Ugly Guide #3: To Being Alive and Staying That Way (2009) ISBN 9780375857027
- Just Like Bossy Bear (2009) ISBN 9781423110972
- Chilly Chilly Ice-Bat (2009) ISBN 9780375845079
- 1 2 3 4 U (2009) ISBN 9780375853449
- ABC U Later (2009) ISBN 9780375853432
- The UglyDoll Ugly Guide #4: To Eating Out and Keeping It Down (2010) ISBN 9780375864339
- Ugly Colors (2010) ISBN 9780375857294
- Babo's Cookie Problem (2011) ISBN 9780375854293
- What Dat? (2011) ISBN 9780375864346
- Uglydoll: SHHHHHHH (2013) Comic Book ISBN 9781421557236
- Uglydoll: Eat Dat! (2013) Comic Book
- Uglydoll: Goin' Places (2013) Comic Book ISBN 9781421555225

== Sources ==
- Wall Street Journal Interview
- Vinyl Creep
- Los Angeles Times Article
