= Tim Biskup =

American painter (born 1967)

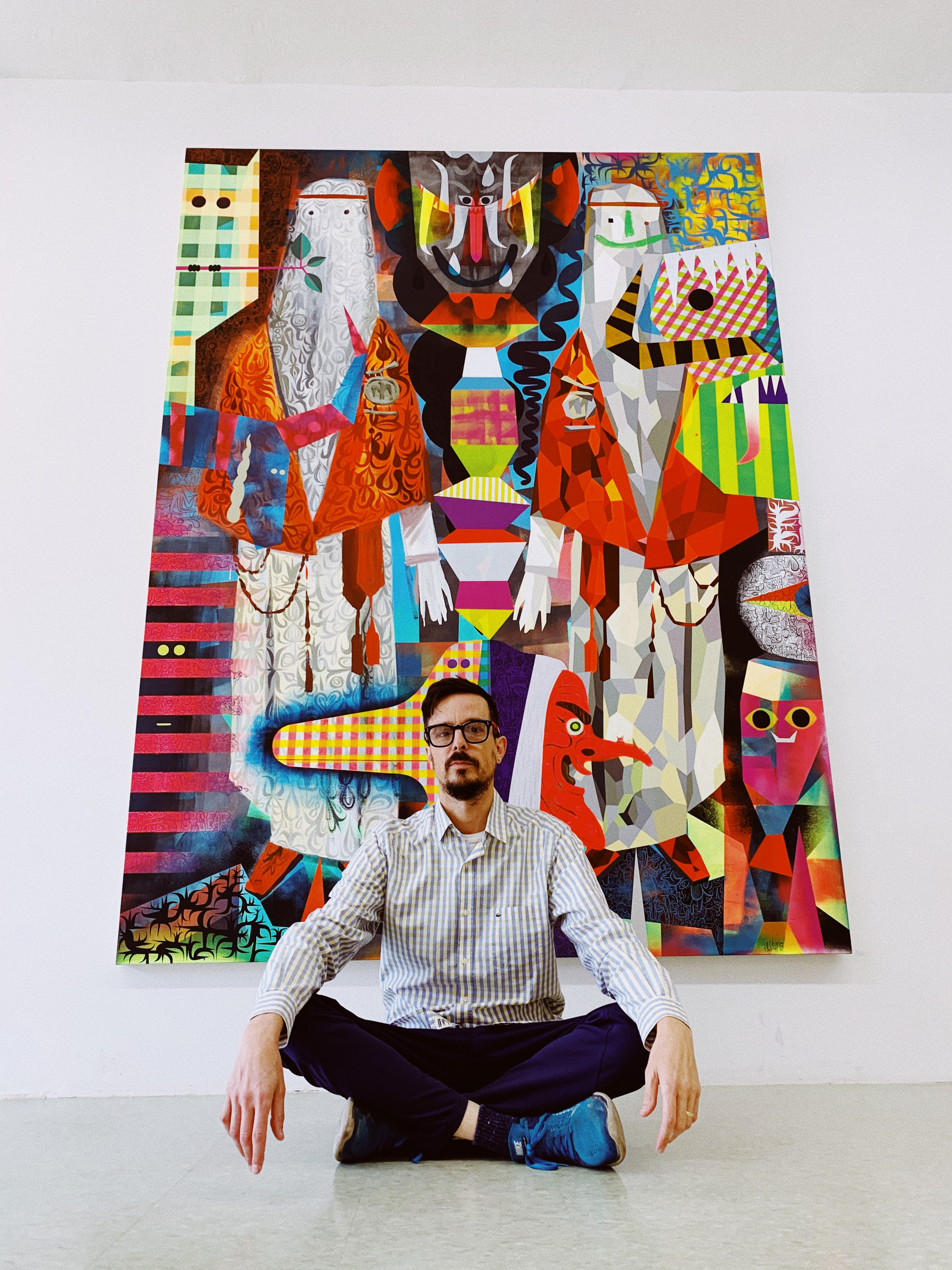
- Born: September 21, 1967 (age 58); Santa Monica, California, U.S.
- Education: Otis College of Art and Design
- Known for: Illustration, product design, painting, sculpture
- Spouse: Seonna Hong (divorced)
- Website: www.timbiskup.com

Tim Biskup (born 1967), is an American visual artist and designer. He is known for illustration, painting, sculpture, and product design.

== Early life and education ==
Tim Biskup was born on September 21, 1967, in Santa Monica, California. He realized he wanted to become an artist when he visited the Centre Pompidou in 1984 with his family. There he was exposed to the works of Roberto Matta, Niki de Saint Phalle, and Jean Tinguely. He enrolled in the Otis College of Art and Design, Fine Art department in 1986 only to drop out in 1988. He stated in an interview that he was frustrated with the fact that there was an excessive emphasis on conceptualizing art, rather learning how to make art.

For a short while, Biskup was interested in joining the animation industry. He joined Frederator Studios. He was part of the innovative crew at producer Fred Seibert's Oh Yeah! Cartoons, first as a background painter, and then, in the second season, as a creator of his own cartoon short, "Freddy Seymour's Amazing Life."

== Career ==
He works with playful and vibrant psychedelic imagery in the pop-design genre that emerged in the late 20th century through such diverse media as silkscreening, textile production, and rotocast vinyl. Biskup was a co-founder of the GAMA-GO clothing line in San Francisco; working alongside Chris Edmundson and Greg Long from 2001 until 2006.

During his Ether Show in the summer of 2007, Biskup displayed works from his self-dubbed Baroque Modernist style based on fear, loss, and pain. In 2012, Juxtapoz commissioned Biskup for its Adult Swim-themed issue's cover art, which was inspired by Tim and Eric Awesome Show, Great Job!.

In 2017, Biskup opened the gallery and project space, Face Guts located in Glassell Park, Los Angeles.

Biskup's 240-page retrospective monograph and autobiography, Tree of Life, was published in October 2019 by Chronicle Books which the LA Weekly described as showcasing "his unique hybrids of flourishes, atmospherics, geometry, gesture, character, figure, flora and fauna, and an intense, luminous, complex and nuanced supersaturated palette."

== Published works ==
- Tree of Life (October 1, 2019) ISBN 978-1452182087
- Art and Design of Gama-Go (Gama Go) by Greg Long, Chris Edmundson, and Tim Biskup (Jun 15, 2007)
- Dark Horse Deluxe Journal: Tim Biskup (Jan 15, 2003) ISBN 978-1569718704
- Tim Biskup's 100 Paintings (Hardcover - April 21, 2004) ISBN 978-1593070519
- The Jackson 500 Volume 1 (Jun 22, 2005) ISBN 978-1593073558
- The Jackson 500 Volume 2 (Jun 28, 2006) ISBN 978-1593075330
- The Jackson 500 Volume 3 (Jul 4, 2007) ISBN 978-1593077778
- The Jackson 500 Volume 4 (Jan 26, 2010) ISBN 978-1593079765

== Products ==
- Tim Biskup's Lucky Stack by Tim Biskup (box set cards - November 30, 2006)
- GAMA-GO Postcard Book by Tim Biskup (unknown binding - April 2004)
