= List of New School people =

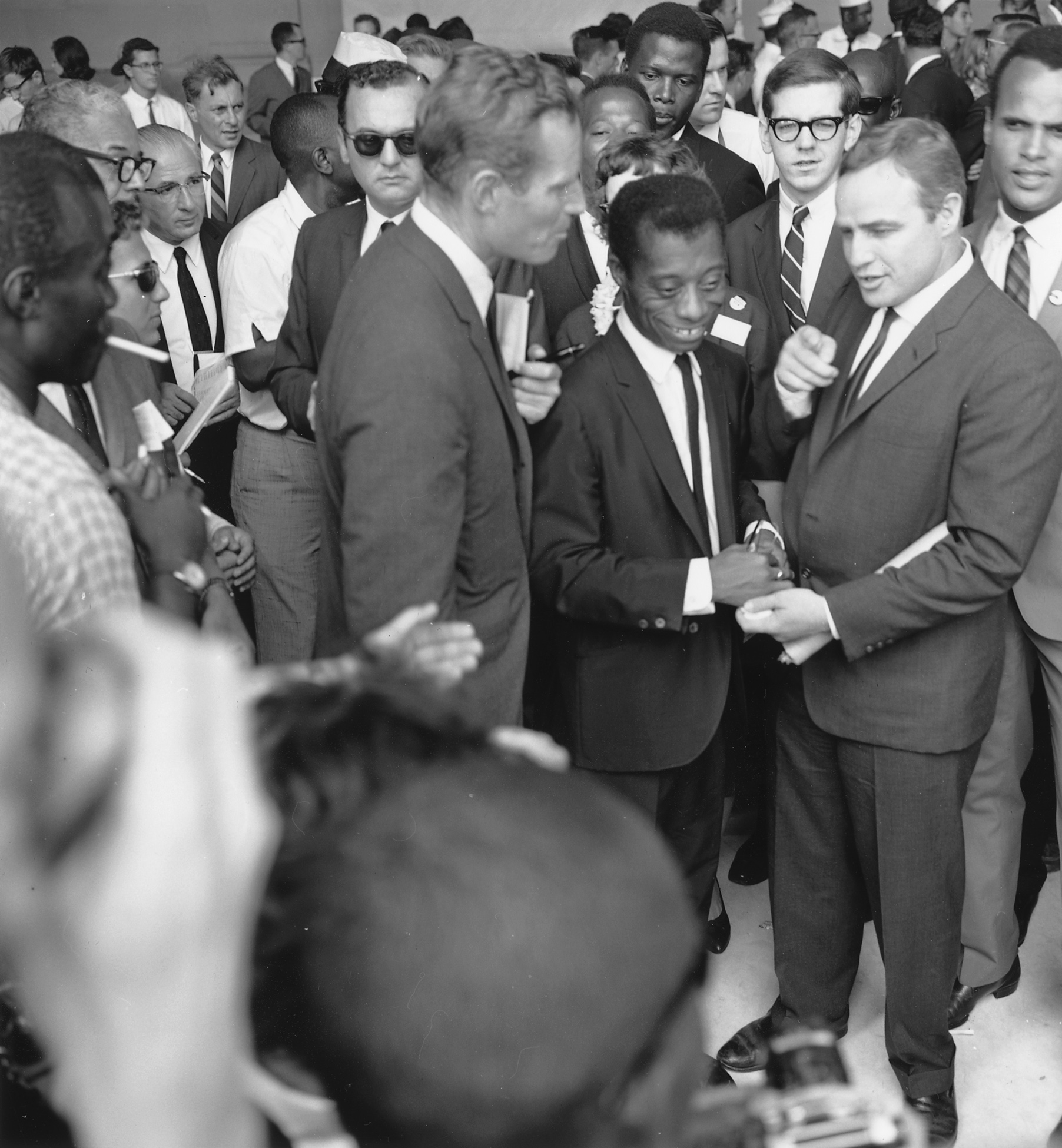
New School alumni (right to left) James Baldwin, Marlon Brando and Harry Belafonte at a civil rights march in 1963

The list of New School people includes notable students, alumni, faculty, administrators and trustees of the New School, a private university in New York City. In 2008, approximately 53,000 living New School alumni resided in more than 112 countries.

== Alumni ==
=== World leaders ===
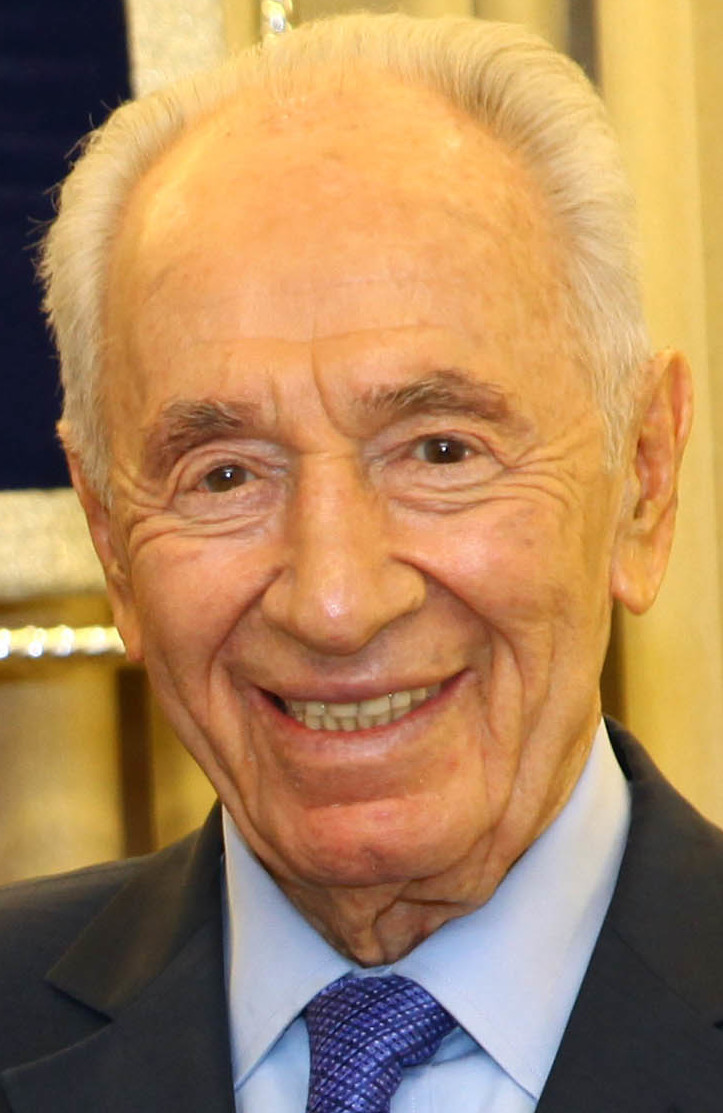
Shimon Peres

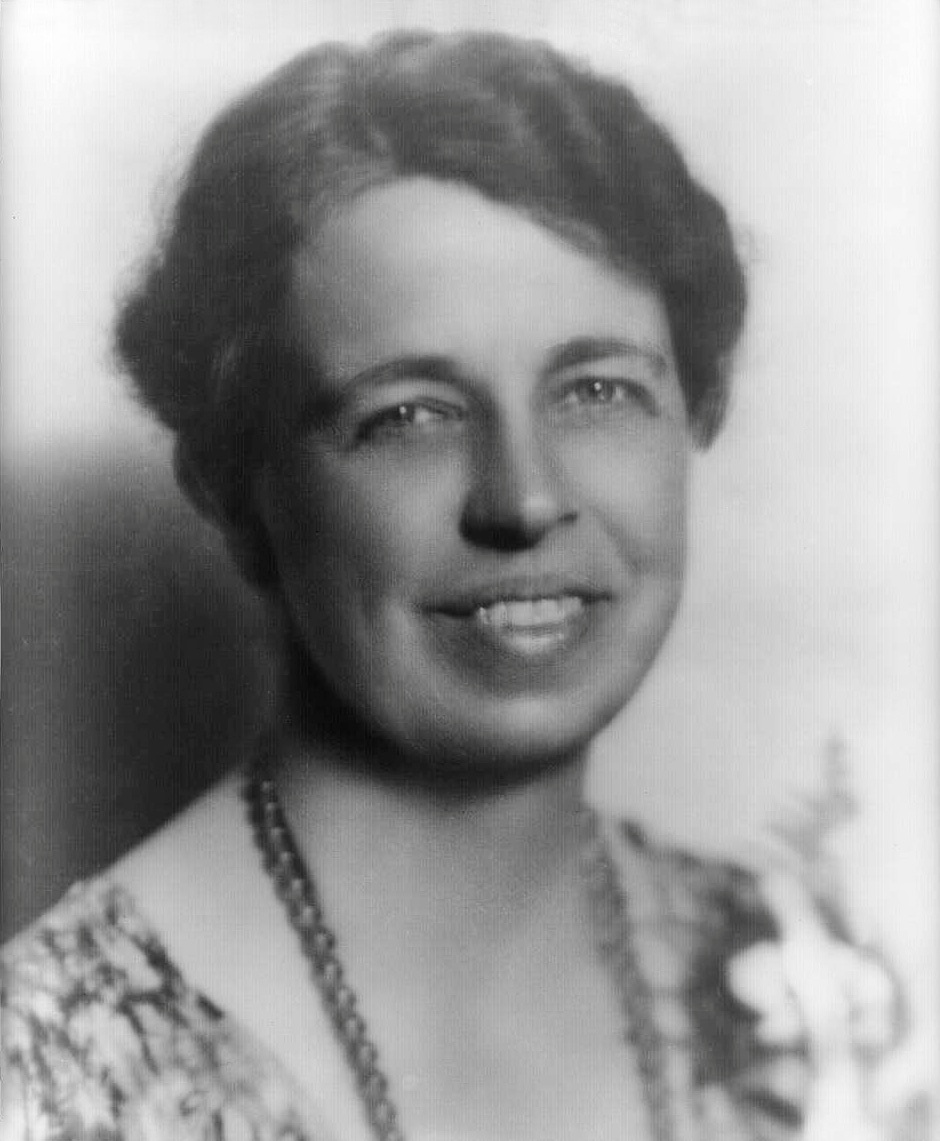
Eleanor Roosevelt

- Hage Geingob, 3rd president of The Republic of Namibia
- Shimon Peres, president of Israel, Nobel Peace Prize recipient
- Eleanor Roosevelt, political activist; First Lady; United Nations Human Rights Prize recipient

=== Academics ===
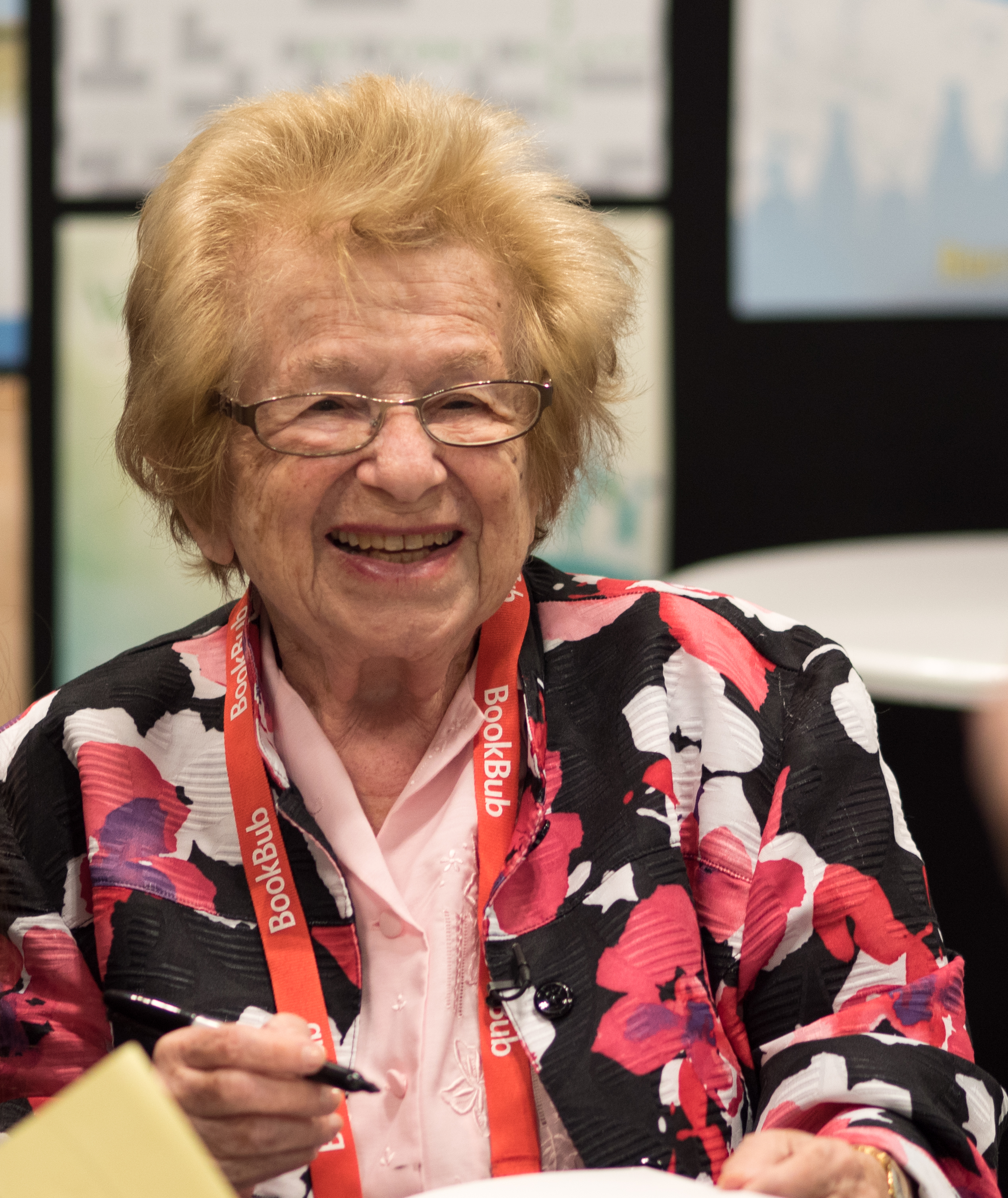
Ruth Westheimer (Dr. Ruth)

- Stanley Aronowitz, B.A., 1968, sociologist
- Nelson Barbosa, Ph.D., economist, ex Brazil's Minister of Finance
- Ruth Benedict, psychological anthropologist, author of Patterns of Culture
- Peter L. Berger, sociologist; co-author of The Social Construction of Reality
- Heather Boushey, Ph.D., economist
- Jean L. Cohen, Ph.D., political theorist
- Barbara A. Cornblatt, Ph.D., M.B.A., psychologist
- Uri Davis, M.A. anthropology, 1973
- Eugene Goossen, art critic and historian
- Richard Grathoff, Ph.D. 1969, sociologist
- Eduard Heimann (1889–1967), economist and social scientist
- Mady Hornig, psychiatrist
- Stephen Kinsella Ph.D., economist
- Abraham Maslow, psychologist, a founder of Humanistic Psychology
- Kevin Mattson, historian and political analyst
- George E. McCarthy, M.A., Ph.D., sociologist
- Sidney Mintz, anthropologist
- Franco Modigliani, Soc. Sci. D., economist; 1985 Nobel Prize in Economics winner
- Sara Mokuria, teacher and activist
- Richard Noll, clinical psychologist and writer
- Ira Progoff, Ph.D. psychology, psychotherapist
- Louis-Philippe Rochon, Ph.D., economist
- Franklin Delano Roosevelt, III, Ph.D., economist
- Steven Seidman, sociologist
- Michael Wenger, M.A., Zen priest, dean of Buddhist Studies, San Francisco Zen Center
- Ruth Westheimer, M.A. sociology, 1959, the first famous sex therapist, born Karola Siegel; known as "Dr. Ruth", German-American, also talk show host, author, professor, Holocaust survivor, and former Haganah sniper
- Nelson Ikon Wu, M.A. art historian, author of Song Never to End

=== Athletes ===
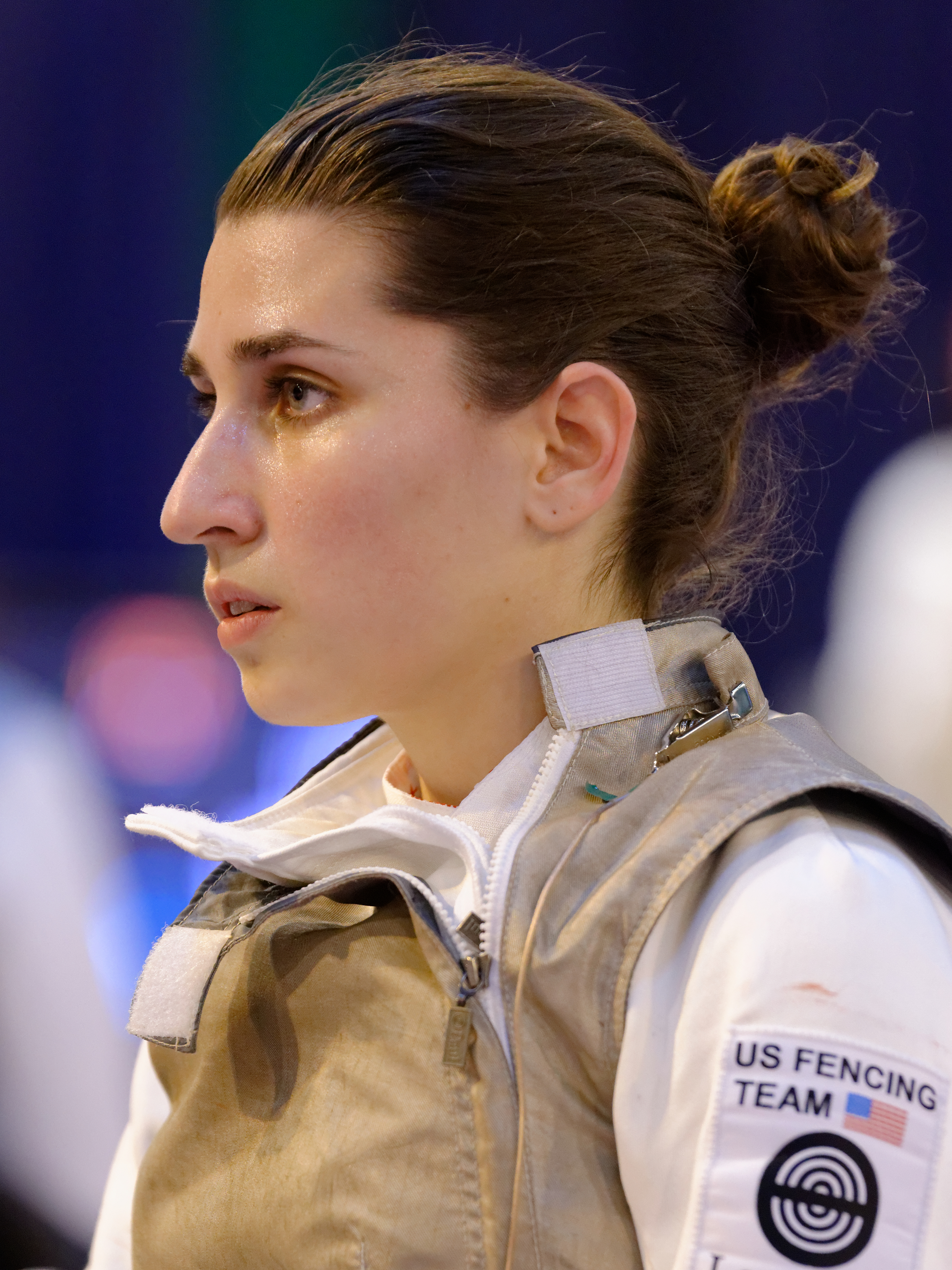
Nicole Ross

- Nate Fish (born 1980), baseball player and coach
- Nicole Ross (born 1989), Olympic foil fencer

=== Businesspeople ===
- Douglas Cliggott, chief investment strategist, JPMorgan Chase
- Stewart Krentzman, president & CEO of Oki Americas, Inc.
- Dolly Lenz, New York real estate agent
- V Pappas, former chief operating officer of TikTok
- Bradford Shellhammer, entrepreneur and designer, founding editor of Queerty
- Brian Willison

=== Writers ===
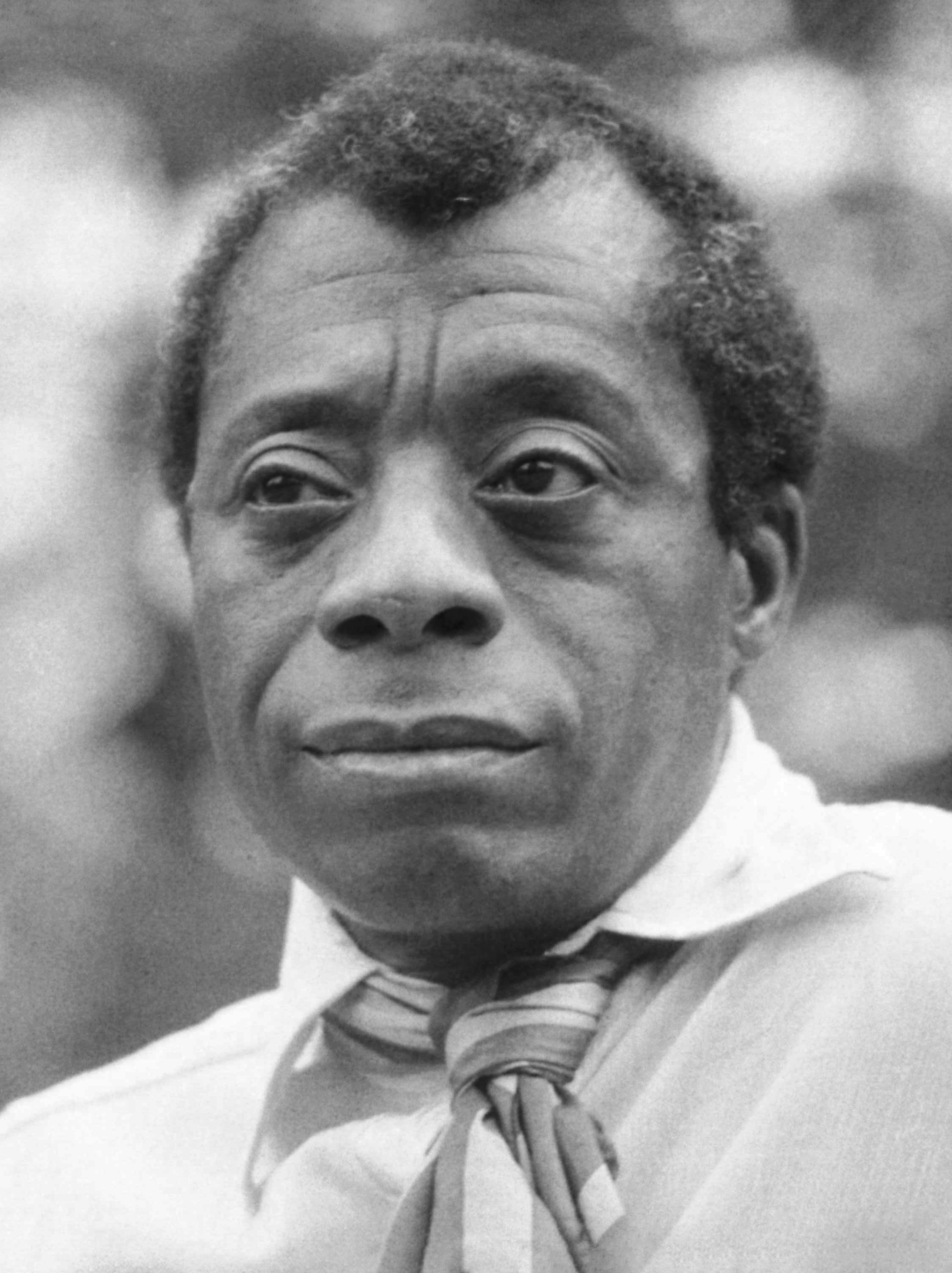
James Baldwin

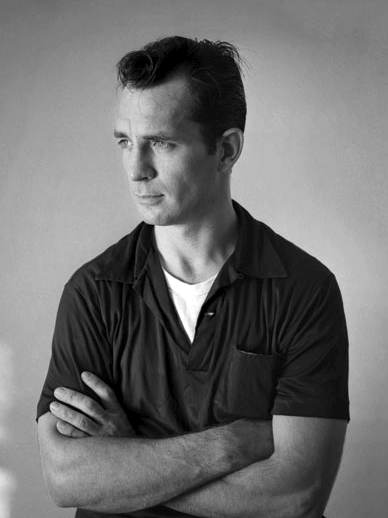
Jack Kerouac

- June Arnold, writer and publisher
- James Baldwin, Go Tell It on the Mountain
- Anatole Broyard, writer, literary critic
- Mike Doughty
- Lorraine Hansberry, playwright, A Raisin in the Sun, youngest Drama Desk Award winner in history
- Andrew Hubner, novelist
- Travis Jeppesen
- Jack Kerouac, On the Road, forerunner of the Beat Generation
- Jamaica Kincaid
- Amy Kurzweil, cartoonist and graphic novelist
- Sam Lansky, author of The Gilded Razor and Broken People
- Paul Levinson, author of The Silk Code, Locus Award winner, Best First Novel, 2000; and The Plot to Save Socrates
- Leandra Medine, author of the blog Man Repeller
- Mario Puzo, author of The Godfather, two-time Academy Award winner, including Best Screenplay
- Brother Sean Sammon, superior general of the Marist Brothers
- William Styron, Sophie's Choice, The Confessions of Nat Turner
- Tennessee Williams, two-time Pulitzer Prize-winning playwright
- Sean Wilsey, author of Oh the Glory of It All

=== Designers ===
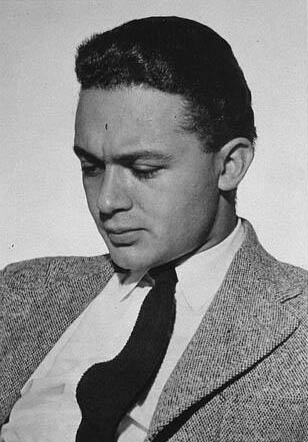
Paul Rand

- Hector Luis Bustamante, actor and graphic designer
- Philippe Cramer, furniture designer
- Burton Miller, costume and fashion designer
- Herbert Muschamp, architectural critic
- Paul Rand (born Peretz Rosenbaum), art director and graphic designer
- Will Wright, creator of The Sims

=== Fashion designers ===
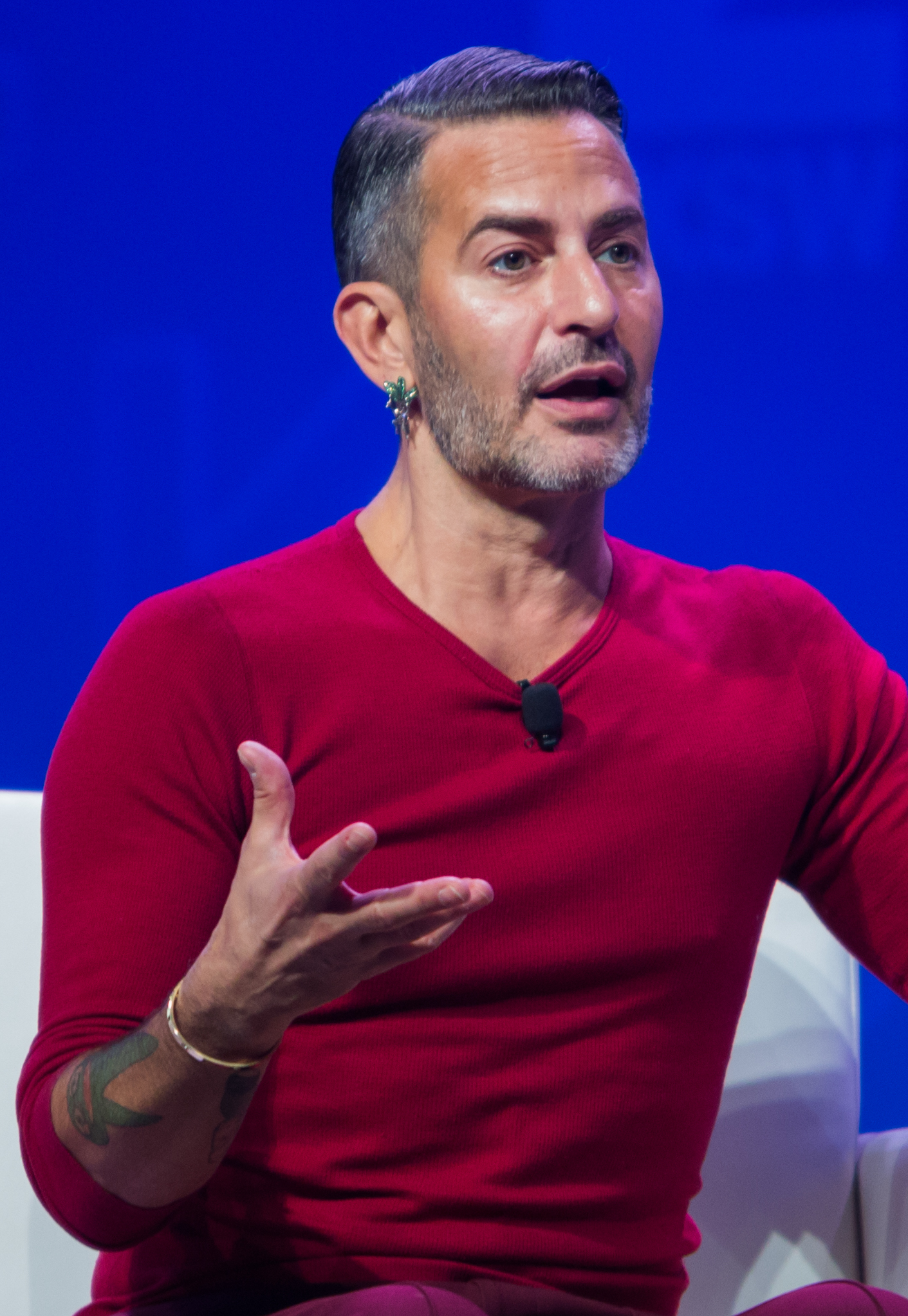
Marc Jacobs

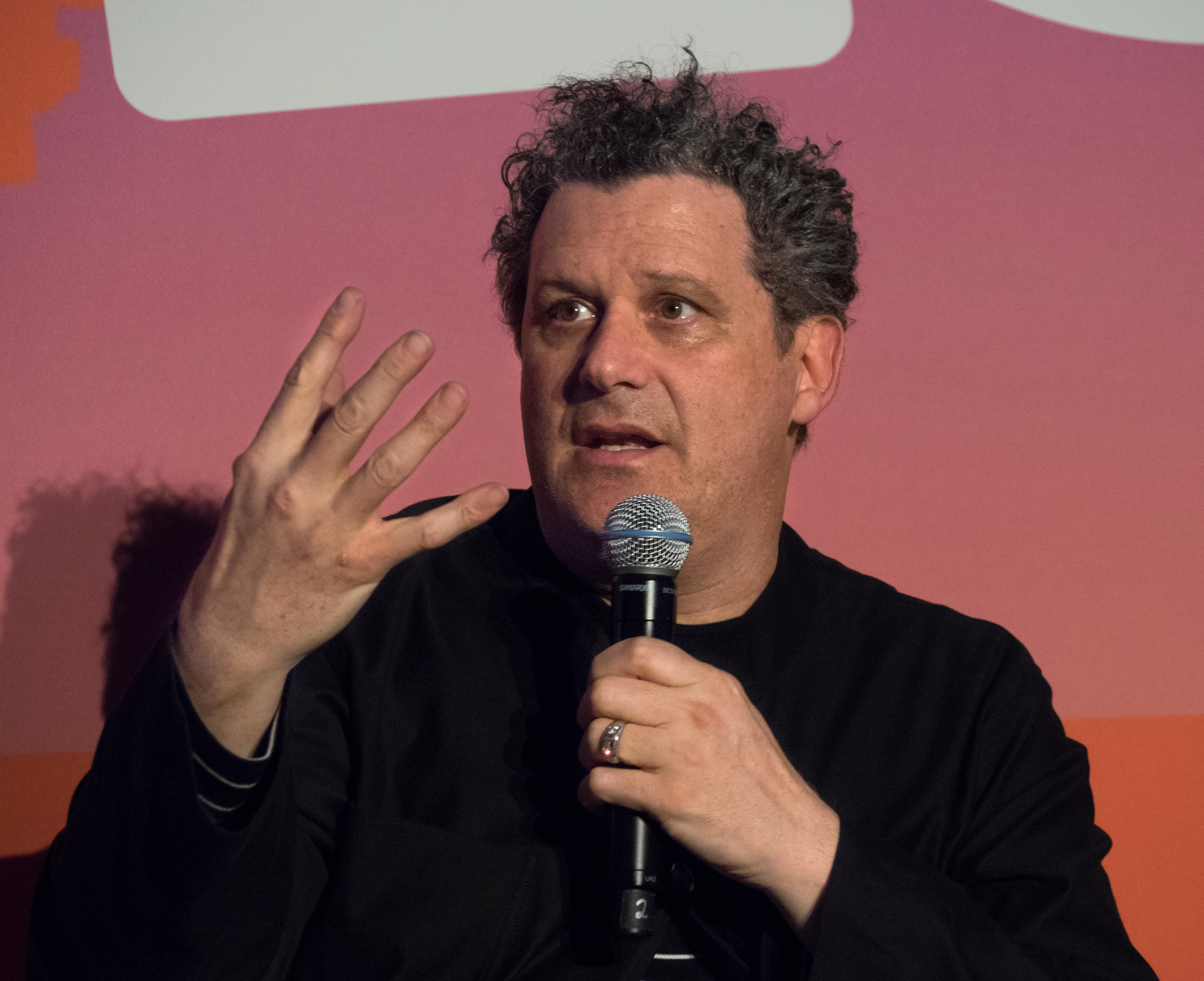
Isaac Mizrahi

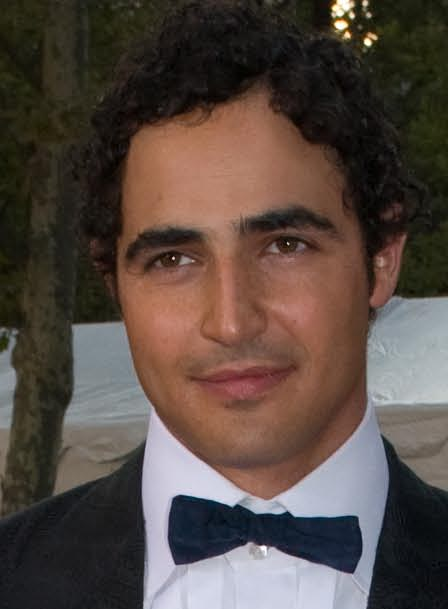
Zac Posen

- Gilbert Adrian, costumer designer
- Bill Blass, President's Committee on the Arts and Humanities member; co-founder of Council of Fashion Designers of America
- Donald Brooks
- Angela Gisela Brown, former New York fashion designer, now known as Princess Angela of Liechtenstein
- Doo-Ri Chung, Swarovski's Perry Ellis Award winner
- Tom Ford, filmmaker and founder of the Tom Ford brand
- Prabal Gurung
- Lazaro Hernandez
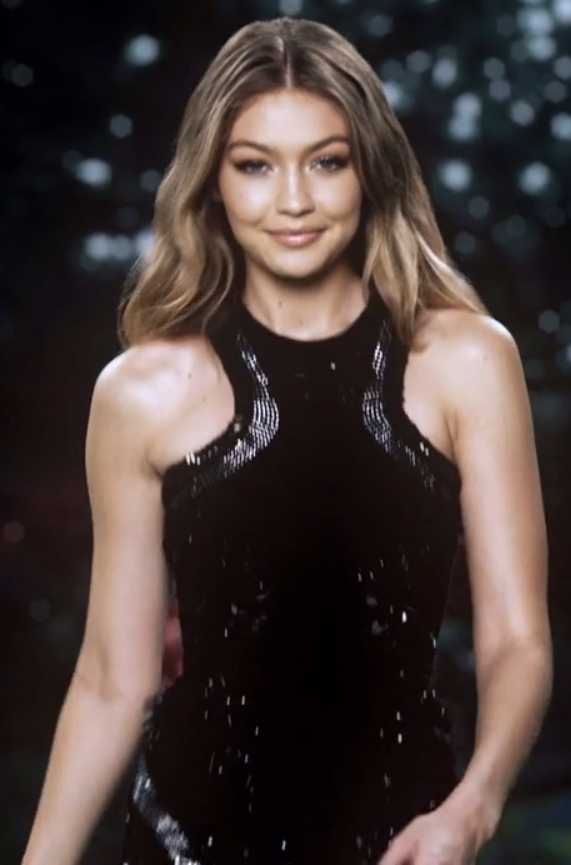
- Gigi Hadid
  Marc Jacobs, fashion designer
- Elois Jenssen, costume designer for I Love Lucy
- Kevin Johnn, appeared on Project Runway
- Donna Karan, creator of the DKNY label
- Reed Krakoff, creative director of Tiffany & Co.
- Derek Lam
- Jillian Lewis, appeared on Project Runway
- Jenna Lyons
- Claire McCardell
- Raul Melgoza, fashion designer, former CE at LUCA LUCA
- Isaac Mizrahi, four-time CDFA award winner
- Sarah Phillips
- Zac Posen, fashion designer
- Patrick Robinson
- Narciso Rodriguez
- Lela Rose
- Behnaz Sarafpour
- Ebony Short, sewing manager for Baltimore Ravens
- Willi Smith, fashion designer
- Peter Som
- Anna Sui
- Kay Unger
- Carmen Marc Valvo
- Alexander Wang, fashion designer for Michelle Obama and Ivana Trump
- Jason Wu, artist and fashion designer

=== Models ===
- Gigi Hadid

=== Fine artists ===
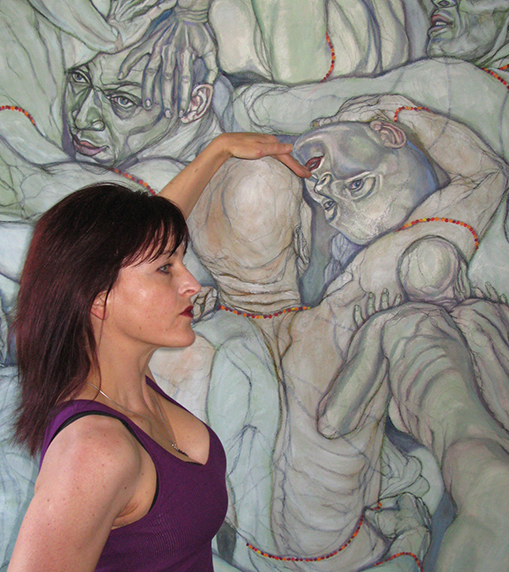
Sol Kjøk

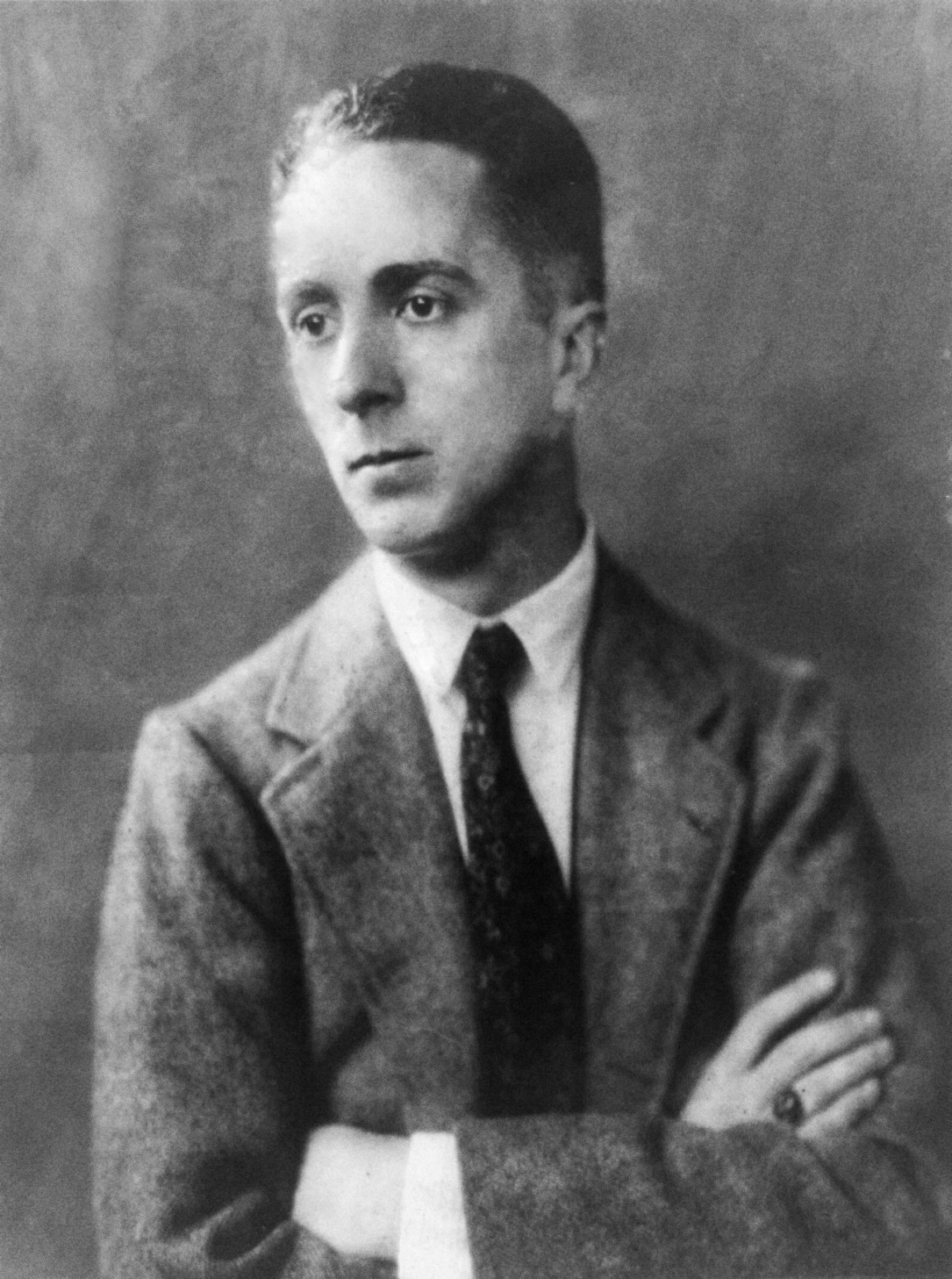
Norman Rockwell

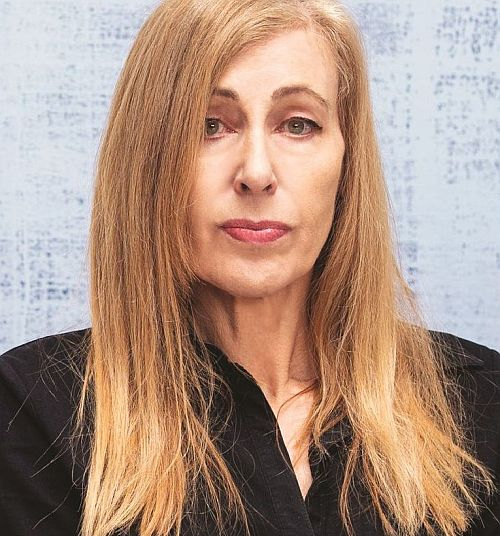
Julie Umerle

- Kevin Appel, painter
- Rosemary Cove, sculptor
- Julio Rosado del Valle, painter
- Stephen Edlich, artist, known for his collages, sculptures, and prints
- Dorathy Farr, painter
- Dan Flavin, lighting artist
- Jane Frank (Jane Schenthal), painter, mixed media artist, sculptor, advertising designer, illustrator
- Adolph Gottlieb, painter
- Julie Harvey, painter
- Edward Hopper, painter
- D Hwang, sculptor and painter
- Jasper Johns, forerunner of pop art and minimalism
- Shirley Kaneda, painter, Guggenheim Fellow, National Endowment for the Arts Fellow
- Sol Kjøk, visual artist
- Shigeko Kubota, vice chairman of Fluxus
- George Maciunas, founding member of Fluxus
- Yucef Merhi, visual artist and new media art pioneer
- Rob Pruitt, sculptor
- Norman Rockwell, painter; Presidential Medal of Freedom winner
- Gavin Spielman, painter and musician
- Roman Turovsky, painter and musician
- Julie Umerle, painter
- Storme Webber, interdisciplinary artist
- Ai Weiwei, filmmaker, installation artist and architectural designer
- Janise Yntema, painter

=== Illustrators and animators ===
- Peter DeSeve, illustrator and character designer
- Julia Gran, graphic designer and illustrator, children's book writer and illustrator
- Bessie Pease Gutmann, magazine and children's book illustrator in the early 1900s
- Hidekaz Himaruya, manga artist (Hetalia: Axis Powers, Chibi-san Date)
- Joel Resnicoff, commercial artist and fashion illustrator
- Brian Wood, graphic novelist, illustrator, designer
- Dan Yaccarino, children's book writer and illustrator

=== Musicians ===
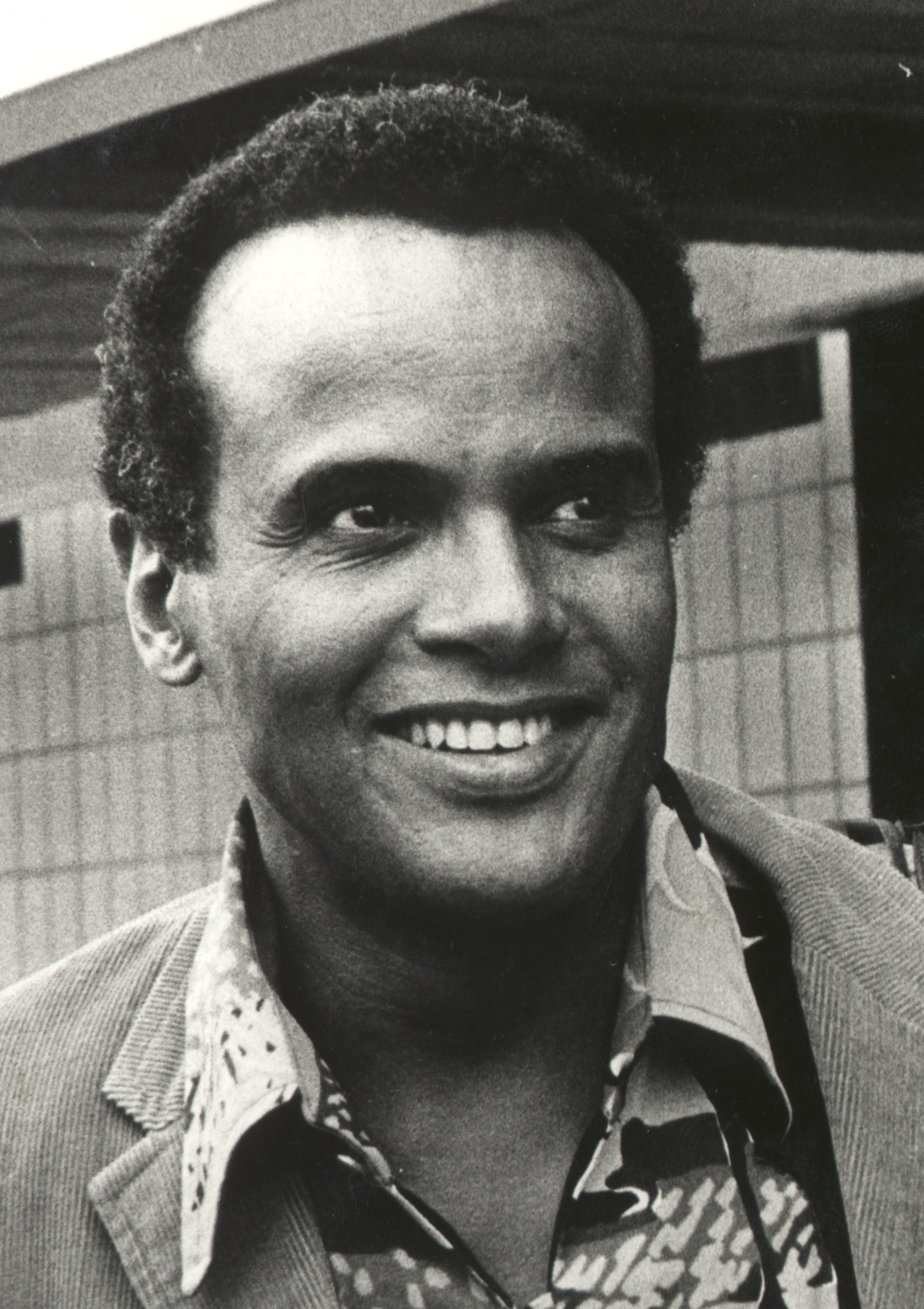
Harry Belafonte

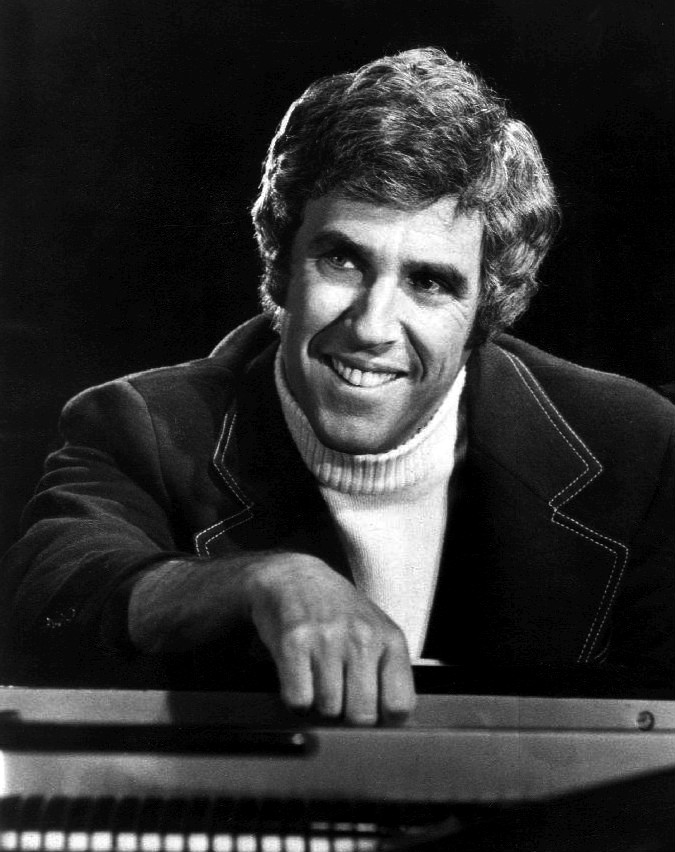
Burt Bacharach

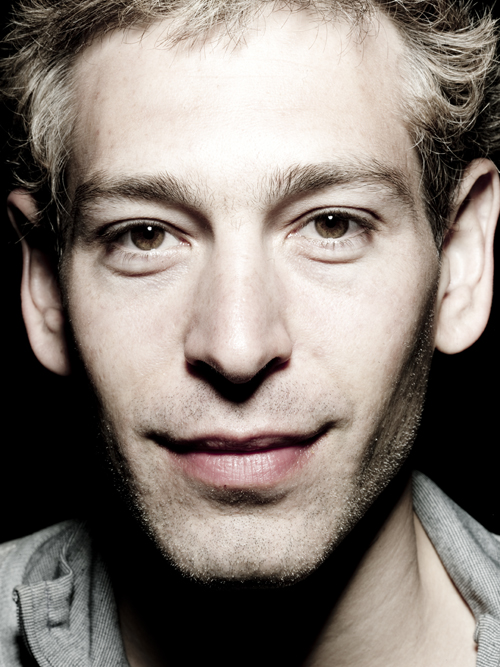
Matisyahu

- Burt Bacharach, composer
- Harry Belafonte, singer
- Michel Camilo, Dominican pianist and composer
- Kelly Chen, Hong Kong singer and actress
- Myung-whun Chung, Korean conductor
- Bethany Cosentino, singer
- Danielle de Niese, Australian-American opera singer (lyric soprano)
- Ani DiFranco, American-Canadian singer-songwriter
- Mike Doughty, B.A. from Lang in poetry
- Bill Evans, pianist and composer
- Robert Glasper, jazz pianist and Grammy-winning R&B artist
- Larry Goldings, jazz pianist and organist
- Richard Goode, pianist
- Larry Harlow, M.A. in Philosophy, salsa pioneer
- Kakie, Filipino singer-songwriter
- Yonghoon Lee, opera singer (tenor)
- Matisyahu (born Matthew Miller), 2002, reggae artist, rapper, and beatboxer
- Brad Mehldau, jazz pianist and composer
- Murray Perahia, pianist
- John Popper, singer/harmonica player for Blues Traveler
- Jake Shears, vocalist
- Alex Skolnick, Trans-Siberian Orchestra, Testament and the Alex Skolnick Trio
- Sufjan Stevens, MFA, creative writing, 2000
- Marcus Strickland, jazz saxophonist
- Roman Turovsky-Savchuk, composer, lutenist and painter
- Wallice, indie pop musician
- Sean Yseult, bassist for White Zombie
- Michael Zager, music producer
- Daniel Zamir, Israeli saxophonist and singer

=== Photographers ===
- David Attie, photographer
- Jill Enfield, photographer
- Ed Feingersh, photojournalist
- Ryan McGinley, photographer
- Steven Meisel, fashion photographer
- Stewart Shining, fashion photographer
- Marion Post Wolcott, photographer

=== Actors, directors, and producers ===
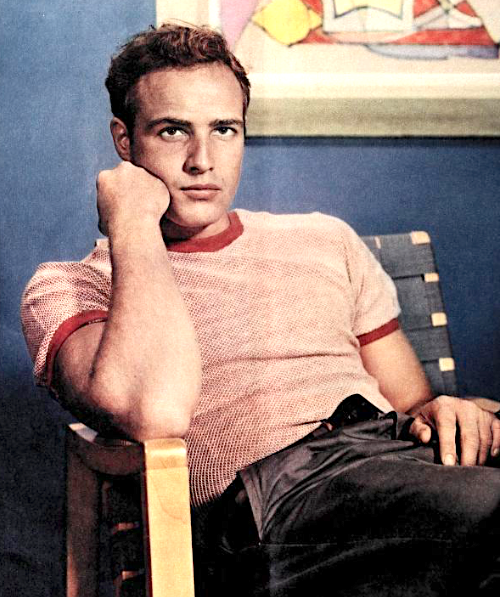
Marlon Brando

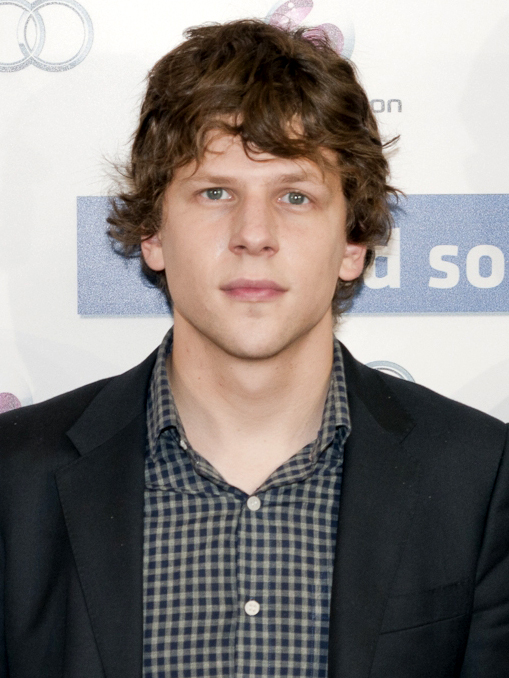
Jesse Eisenberg

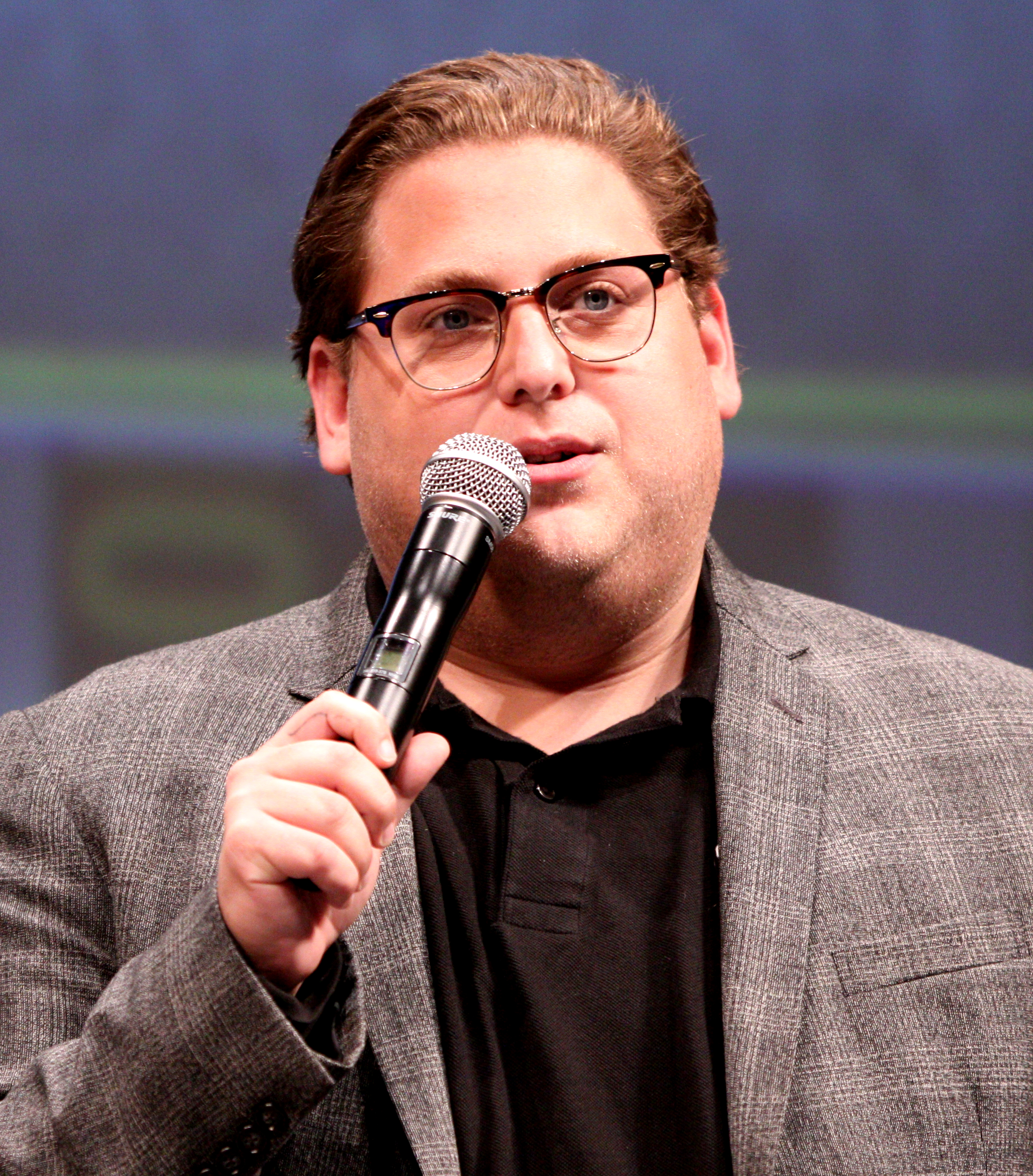
Jonah Hill

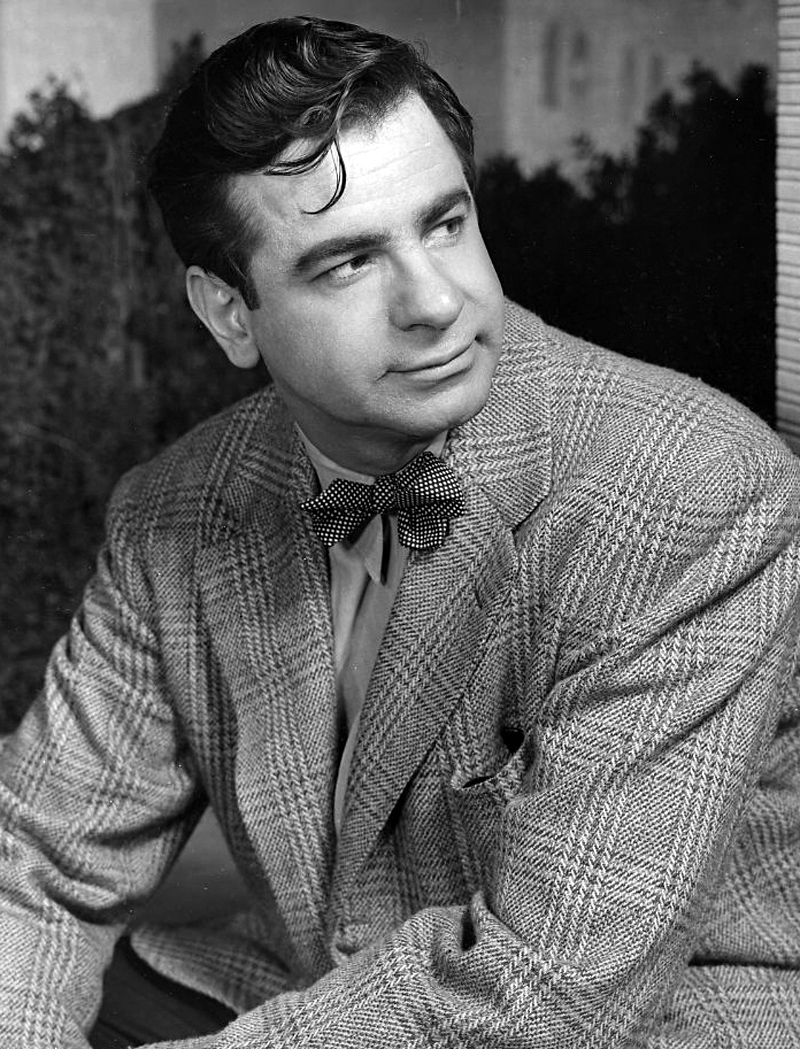
Walter Matthau

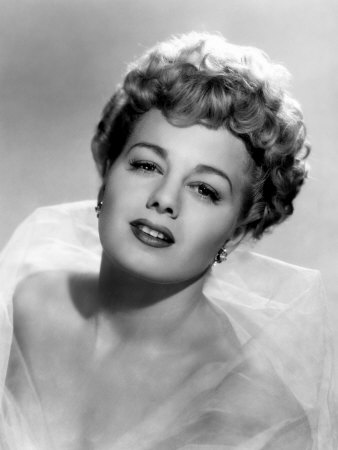
Shelley Winters

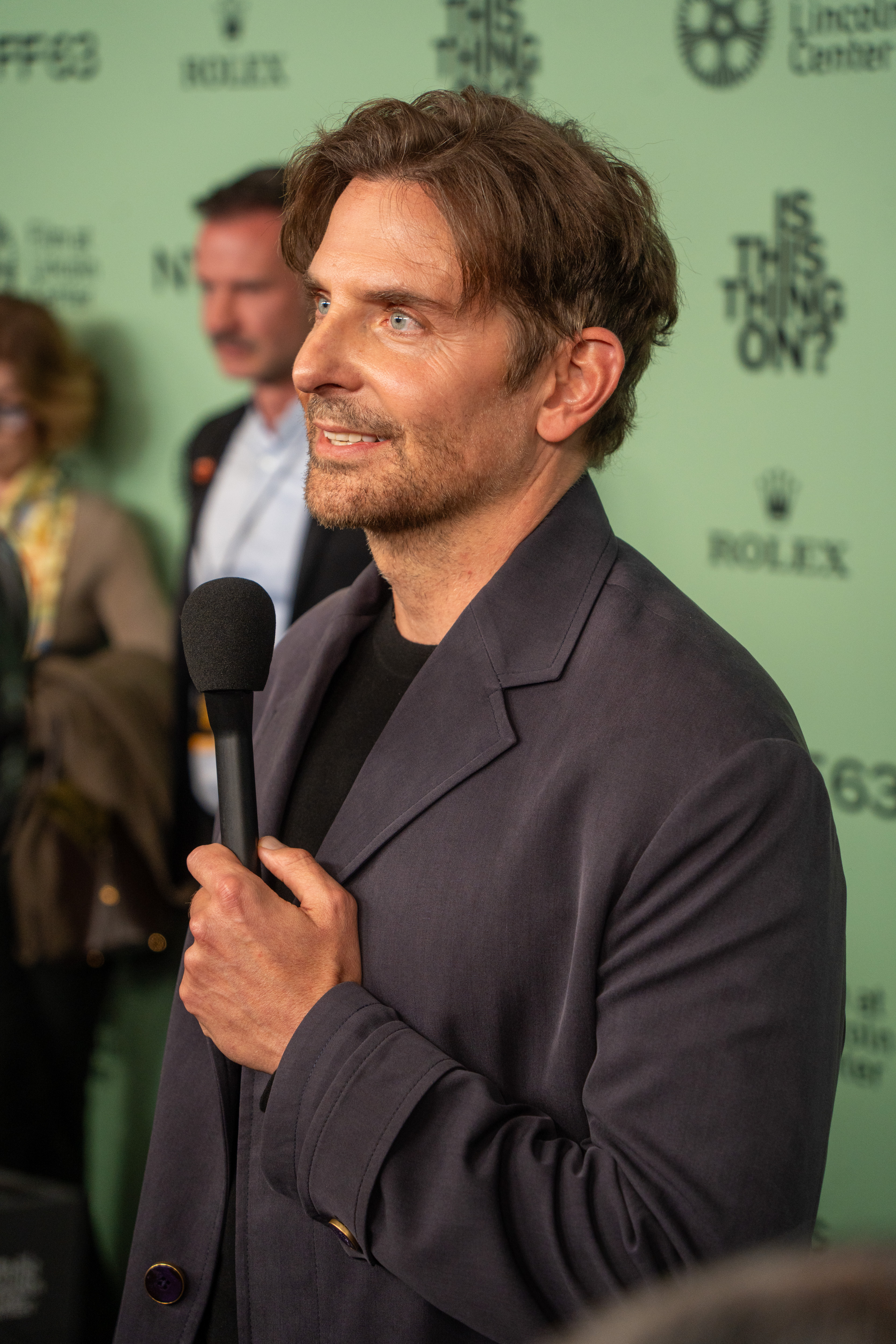
Bradley Cooper

- Beatrice Arthur, theater and television actress, Tony Award winner, star of Maude and The Golden Girls
- Sean Baker, director of The Florida Project
- Harry Belafonte
- Richard ("Dick") Bernstein
- Derrick Borte
- Marlon Brando
- Vinnette Justine Carroll, playwright, actress, and theatre director
- T.V. Carpio, actress and singer
- Bradley Cooper, Academy Award-nominated actor
- Adrian Cronauer
- Tony Curtis
- Paul Dano, Little Miss Sunshine
- Jean de Meuron
- Matt Deitsch, film director and freelance photographer
- Deepti Divakar, Indian model, actress, writer, Femina Miss India World 1981
- Elisa Donovan, Clueless and Sabrina the Teenage Witch
- Jesse Eisenberg, The Social Network
- Tanaz Eshaghian (born 1974), Iranian-born American documentary filmmaker – Be Like Others, Love Crimes of Kabul
- Peter Falk, B.A. political science, Columbo
- Stacy Farber, actress, former Degrassi: The Next Generation cast member
- Ben Gazzara
- Jillian Hervey
- Jonah Hill, Superbad, Academy Award Nominee Wolf of Wall Street, Moneyball
- Harry Hurwitz, film director and artist
- Adam Jasinski, winner of Big Brother 9
- Sun Lee, Miss Korea 2007
- Karen Maine, director and screenwriter, Yes, God, Yes, Starstruck
- Walter Matthau
- Charis Michelsen, actress
- Adam Pally, actor
- Lauren Patten, actress
- Joel Schumacher, film director and producer
- Kevin Smith, Clerks (did not graduate)
- Rod Steiger, On the Waterfront
- Elaine Stritch
- Garrison True, actor
- Shih-Ching Tsou
- Rob Weiss, kicked out of film program
- Shelley Winters
- Rob Zombie (born Robert Cummings), musician, writer and director

=== Politicians ===
- Medea Benjamin, political activist
- Johanna Contreras, acting executive of Ulster County, New York
- William Donohue, sociology, Catholic League president
- Millicent Fenwick, editor, politician, diplomat
- Abraham Foxman, director of Anti-Defamation League
- Alice-Mary Higgins, independent senator and member of the Irish Senate
- Janine Jackson, MA sociology, program director of Fairness and Accuracy in Reporting
- Ellen Johnson, MA political science, president of American Atheists
- Kevin Parker, New York state senator
- Yossi Sarid, M.A. political science, Israeli statesman and left-wing politician
- Tinga Seisay, diplomat, pro-democracy activist
- Vanessa Wruble, co-founder of The Women's March on Washington

== Faculty ==
=== Past ===
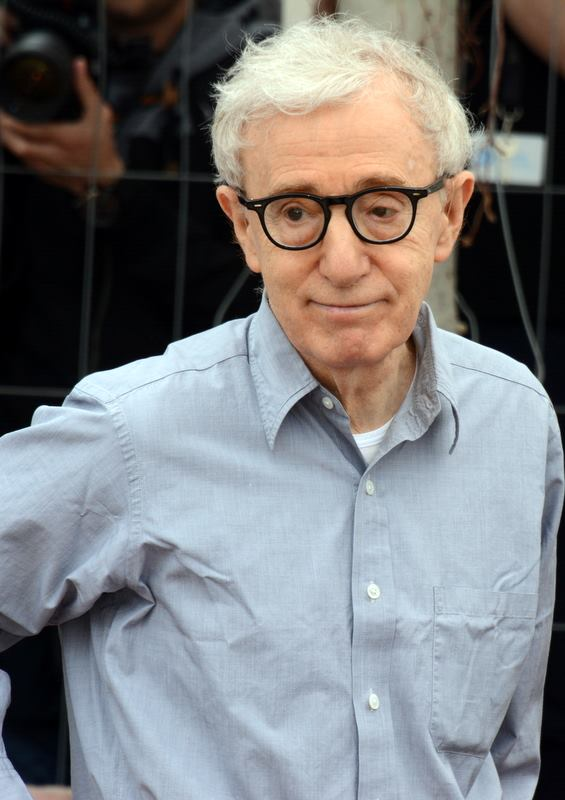
Woody Allen

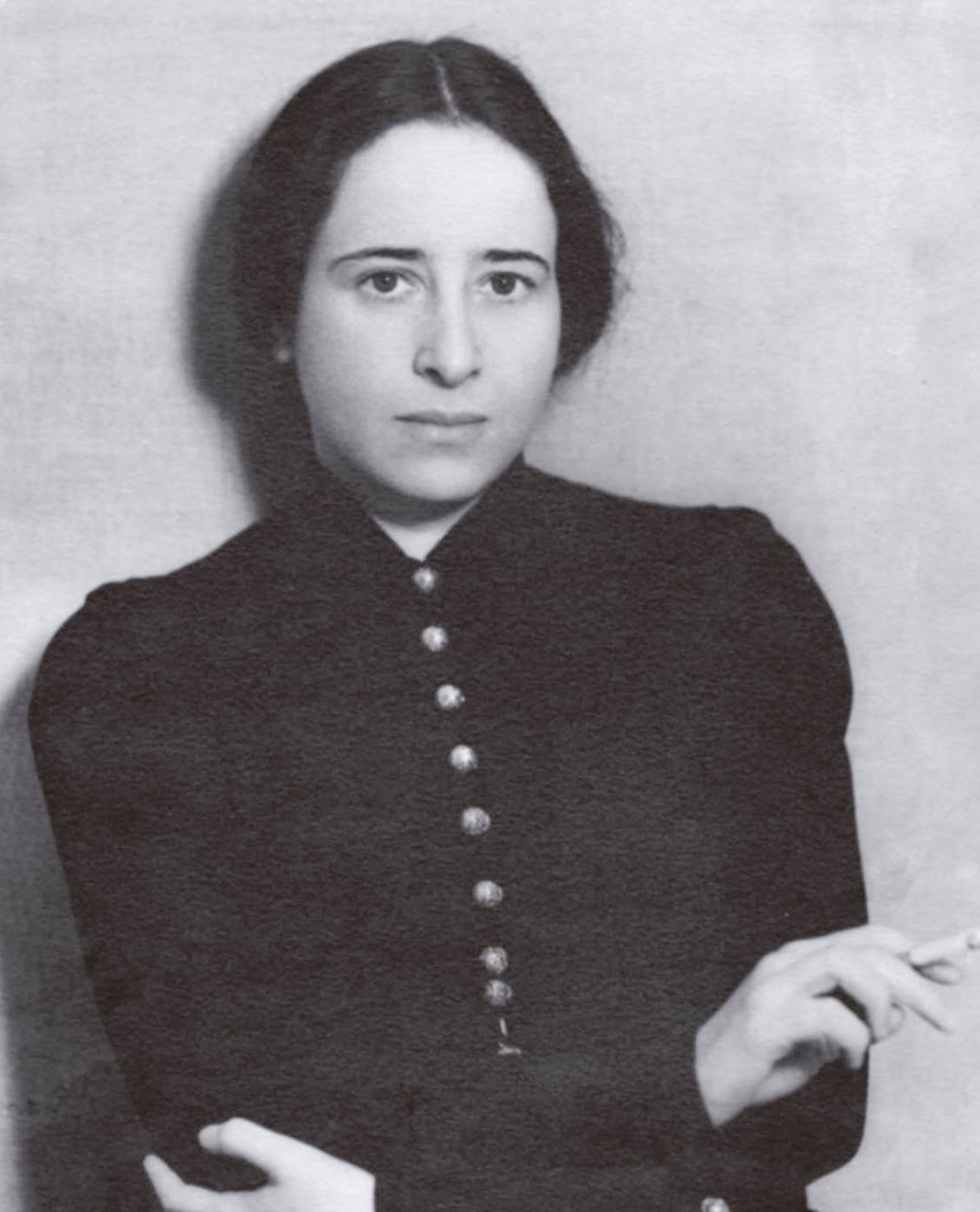
Hannah Arendt

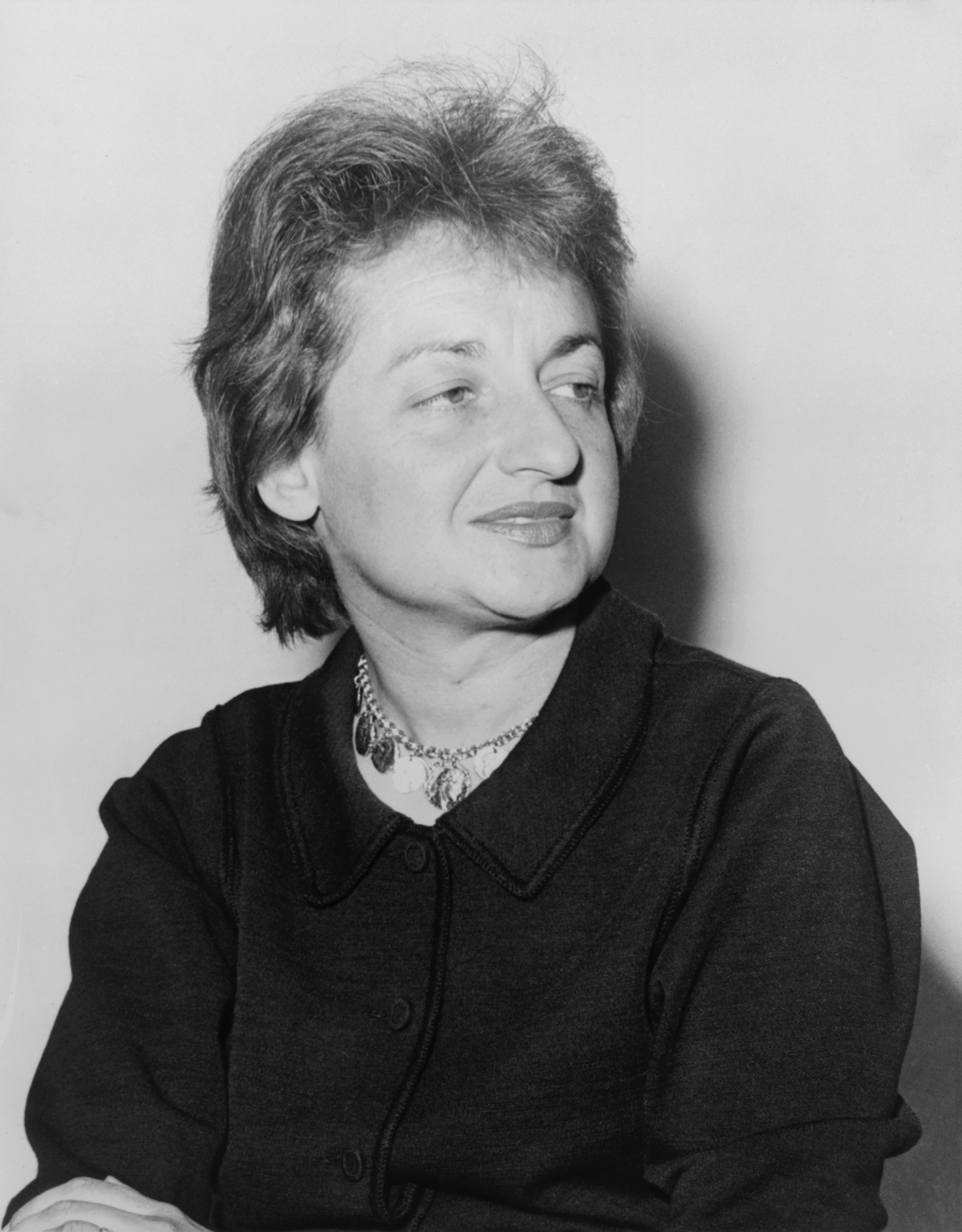
Betty Friedan

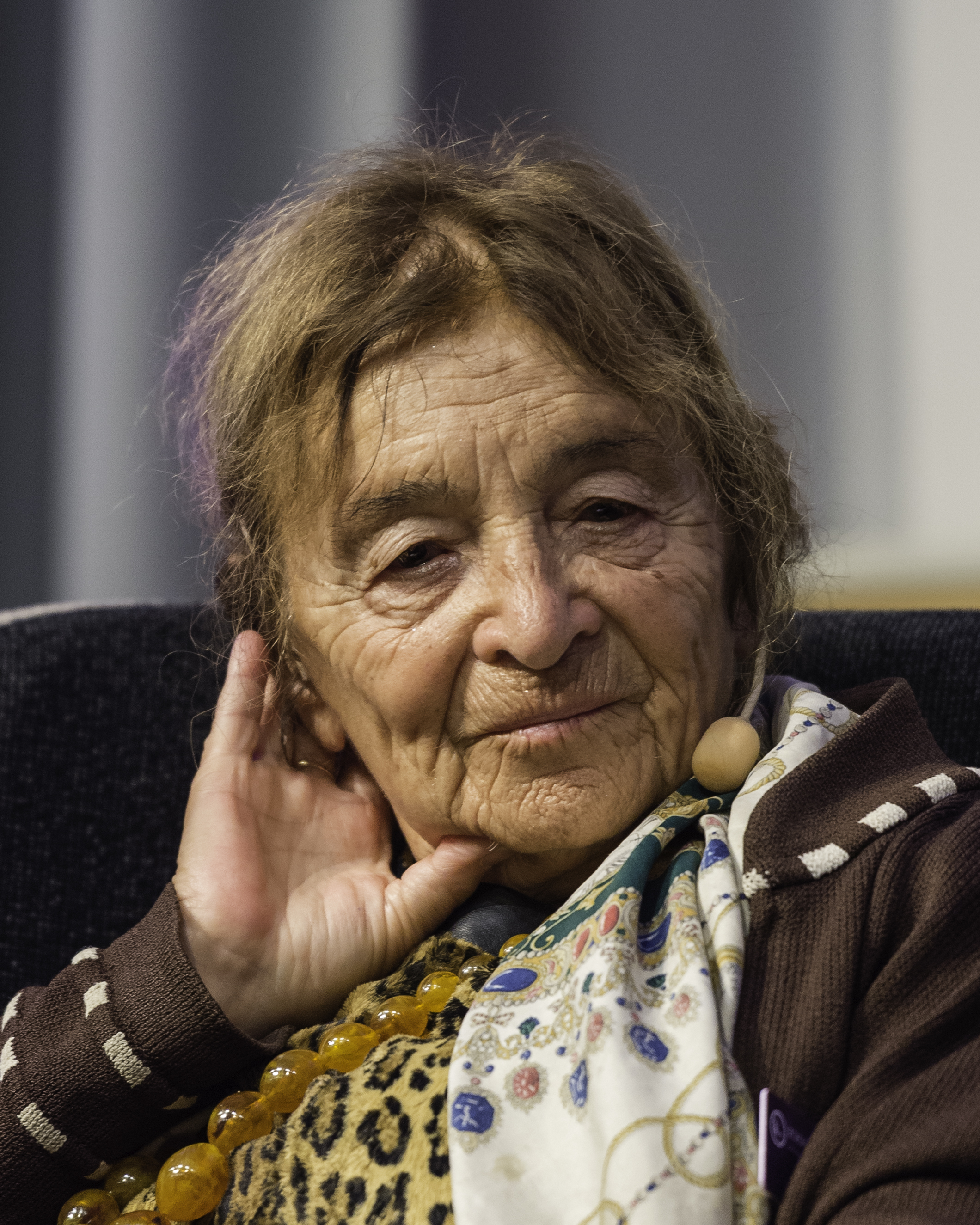
Ágnes Heller

- Janet Abu-Lughod
- Woody Allen
- Hannah Arendt (1906–1975), German-born American political philosopher, author, and Holocaust survivor
- W. H. Auden, British-American poet
- Jason Bateman (born 1969), actor and director
- Seth Benardete
- Eugene Biel-Bienne (1902–1969), Austrian-born American painter
- Franz Boas (1858–1942), German-American anthropologist and ethnomusicologist
- André Breton
- Nathan Brody
- Laurie Halsey Brown
- Richard Brown, film studies educator
- William F. Buckley, Jr.
- Judith Butler
- John Cage
- Edmund Snow Carpenter
- Harry Cleaver
- Hasye Cooperman (1907–1992), American Yiddish poet and literary critic
- Stanley Coren
- Henry Cowell
- Shai Davidai
- Agnes de Lima, journalist, writer, reformer
- Jacques Derrida
- John Dewey
- Stanley Diamond
- W. E. B. Du Bois
- John Eatwell
- Fritz Eichenberg (1901–1990), German-American illustrator and arts educator
- Millicent Fenwick
- Sándor Ferenczi
- Joel Fink, associate dean of Roosevelt University
- Marvin Frankel
- Betty Friedan
- Erich Fromm (1900–1980), German social psychologist, psychoanalyst, sociologist, humanistic philosopher, and democratic socialist
- Robert Frost, poet
- Donna Gaines
- Alexander Goldenweiser
- David Gordon
- Hermann Grab
- Martha Graham
- Joseph Greenberg
- Aron Gurwitsch
- Jürgen Habermas (born 1929), German philosopher and social theorist
- Michael Harner
- Marcia Haufrecht, actress, playwright and director, noted acting teacher and coach
- Werner Hegemann (1881–1936), German-born city planner, architecture critic, and author
- Robert Heilbroner (1919–2005), economist and historian of economic thought
- Ágnes Heller (1929–2019), Hungarian philosopher and lecturer
- Christopher Hitchens
- Eric Hobsbawm
- Karen Horney (née Danielsen; 1885–952), German psychoanalyst
- Michael Hudson (born 1939), economics professor
- Roman Jakobson
- Hans Jonas (1903–1993), German-born American philosopher, the Alvin Johnson Professor of Philosophy at the New School
- Horace Kallen (1882–1974), German-born American philosopher
- Ira Katznelson
- John Maynard Keynes
- Kenneth Koch
- Julia Kristeva
- Ernesto Laclau
- Emil Lederer (1882–1939), German economist and sociologist
- Emanuel Levenson
- Claude Lévi-Strauss (1908–2009), chair of Social Anthropology at the Collège de France, member of the Académie française
- Paul Levinson
- Adolph Lowe (1893–1995), German sociologist and economist
- Ernest Mandel
- Everett Dean Martin
- Bohuslav Martinů
- Margaret Mead
- Jonas Mekas
- N. B. Minkoff (1893–1958), Polish-born American Yiddish poet, newspaper editor, and educator
- Piet Mondrian
- Sidney Morgenbesser
- Lewis Mumford
- David Neiman (1921–2004), Russian-born American scholar in the fields of Biblical Studies and Jewish history
- Reinhold Niebuhr
- Claus Offe (1940–2025), German political sociologist
- Frank O'Hara
- Elsie Clews Parsons
- Cipe Pineles
- Erwin Piscator (1893–1966), German theatre director and producer
- Richard Plant (1910–1998), gay Jewish emigre from Nazi Germany, taught German language and literature
- Eliezer Rafaeli (1926–2018), Israeli founding president of the University of Haifa
- Rayna Rapp, feminist anthropologist
- Adolph L. Reed, Jr. (born 1947), professor emeritus of political science
- Wilhelm Reich (1897–1957), Austrian doctor of medicine and a psychoanalyst
- Herman Rose, professional pseudonym of Herman Rappaport (1909–2007), painter and artist
- Justus Rosenberg (1921–2021), Free City of Danzig-born literature professor
- Bertrand Russell
- Paul Ryan
- Jeremy D. Safran (1952–2018), Canadian-born American clinical psychologist, psychoanalyst, lecturer, and psychotherapy researcher
- Albert Salomon (1891–1966), German-born American sociologist
- Meyer Schapiro (1904–1996), Lithuanian-born American art historian
- Alfred Schutz (1899–1959), Austrian philosopher and social phenomenologist
- Ali Shayegan (1903–1981), Iranian politician
- Benjamin Shwadran (1907–2001), Mandatory Palestine-born Israeli author and professor of Middle Eastern studies
- Leo Strauss (1899–1973), German-American political philosopher and classicist
- Sekou Sundiata
- Paul Sweezy
- G.M. Tamás
- Charles Tilly
- Louis Vaczek (1913–1983), Hungarian-Canadian-American novelist and science writer
- Thorstein Veblen
- Thomas Vietorisz
- Max Wertheimer (1880–1943), Austro-Hungarian psychologist
- Frank Lloyd Wright (1867–1959), architect, designer, writer, and educator
- Abraham Yahuda (1877–1951), Palestinian Jew, polymath, teacher, writer, researcher, linguist, and collector of rare documents
- Michael Zager
- Slavoj Žižek

=== Present ===
- Lani Adeoye, designer
- Robert Antoni
- Andrew Arato
- Jonathan Bach
- Richard Barone
- Jay Bernstein
- Jane Ira Bloom
- Susan Cheever
- Michael Cohen
- Alice Crary
- Simon Critchley
- Siddhartha Deb
- Faisal Devji
- Federico Finchelstein (born 1975), Argentine historian and chair of the history department at the New School
- Nancy Fraser
- Sakiko Fukuda-Parr
- Mary Gaitskill
- Paul Goldberger
- Elana Greenfield, playwright and short story writer
- Nina L. Khrushcheva
- Marcel Kinsbourne
- Ron Leibman
- David Levithan
- Lana Lin
- Arun Luthra
- Vladan Nikolic
- Frank J. Oteri
- Pippin Parker
- Austin Pendleton
- Frank Pugliese
- John Reed
- Miguel Robles-Durán
- Anwar Shaikh
- Christopher Shinn
- Arthur Storch
- Rory Stuart
- Eugene Thacker
- Scott Thornbury
- McKenzie Wark
- Renée T. White, sociologist
- Maya Wiley
- Reggie Workman

=== Dorothy H. Hirshon Directors-in-Residence (for Film and Media Studies) ===
- 2021: Sam Pollard
- 2020: Mary Harron
- 2019: Raoul Peck
- 2018: Sean Baker
- 2017: Jon Alpert and Keiko Tsuno
- 2014: Toni Dove
- 2013: Lynn Hershman Leeson and Benh Zeitlin
- 2012: Ramin Bahrani
- 2011: Guy Maddin
- 2010: Haile Gerima
- 2009: Jim Stark
- 2008: Cynthia Wade
- 2007: John Cameron Mitchell
- 2005: Laurie Anderson
- 2004: John Waters
- 2003: D.A. Pennebaker and Chris Hegedus
