= List of pansexual people =

This is a list of people who identify as pansexual and who are the subjects of articles on the English Wikipedia.

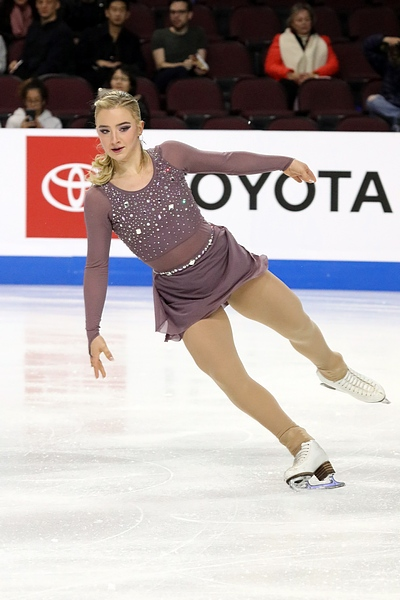
Figure skater, Amber Glenn

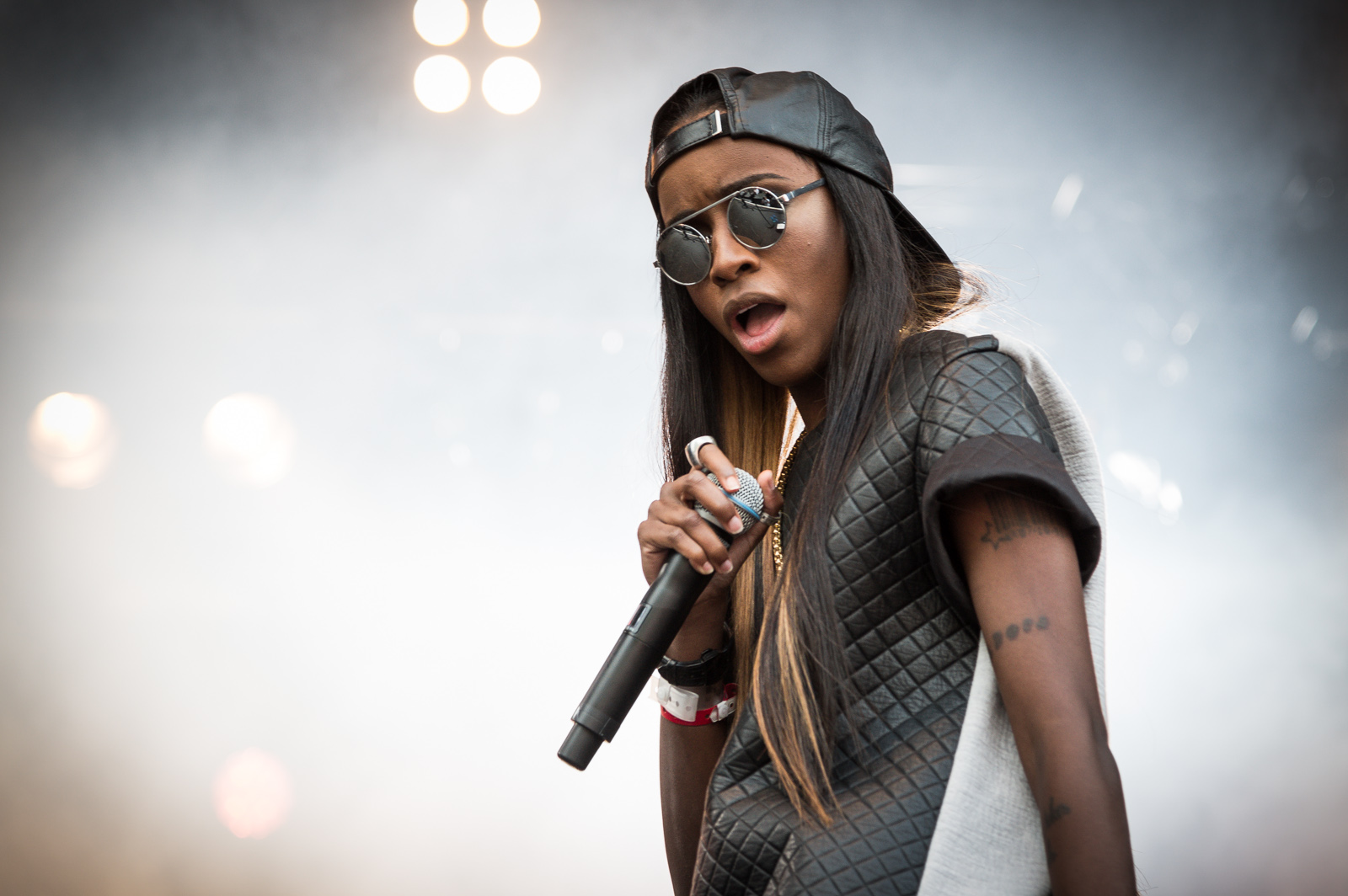
Rapper, Angel Haze

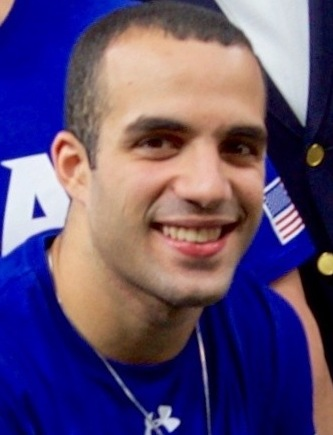
Former gymnast, Danell Leyva

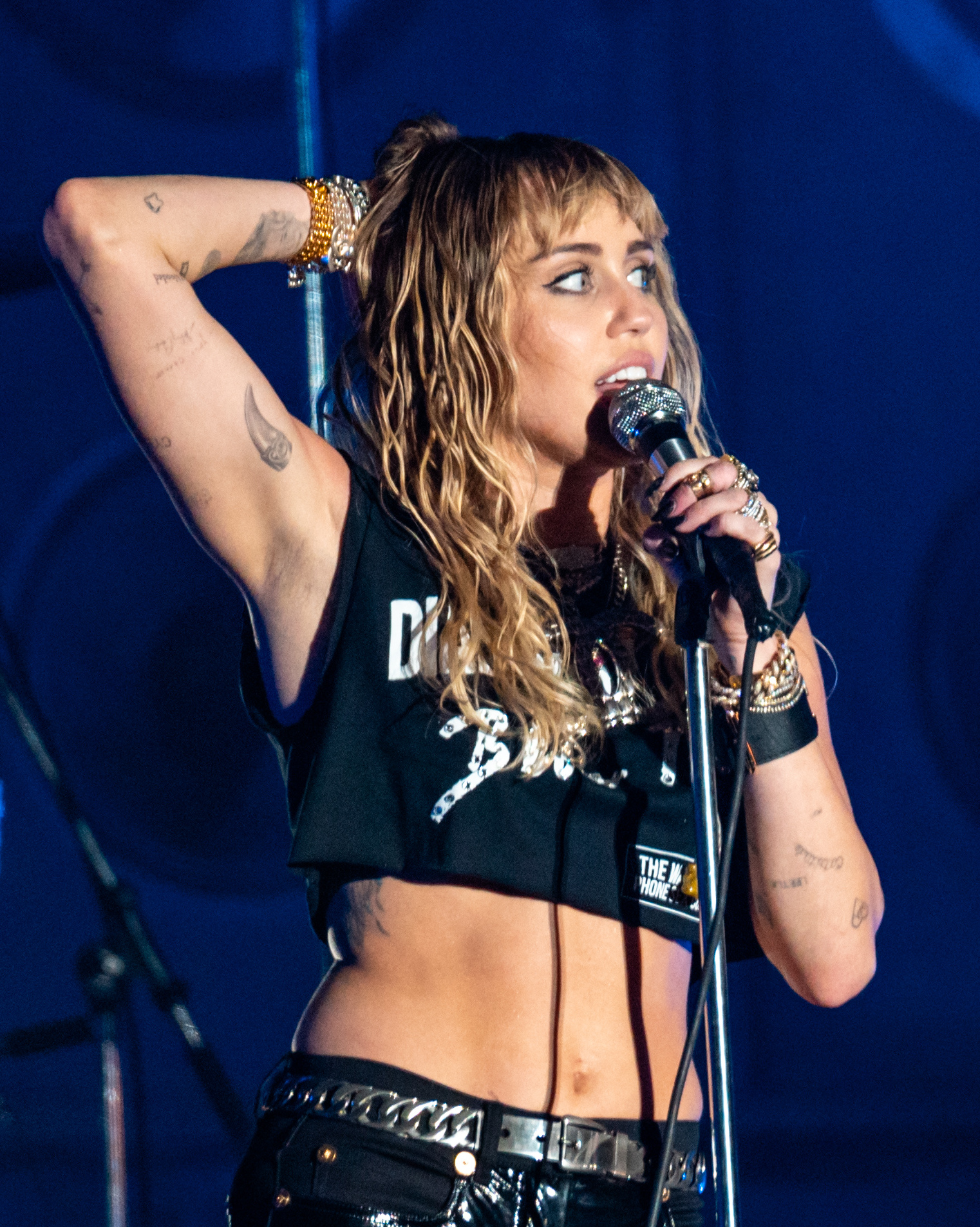
Singer-songwriter and actress, Miley Cyrus

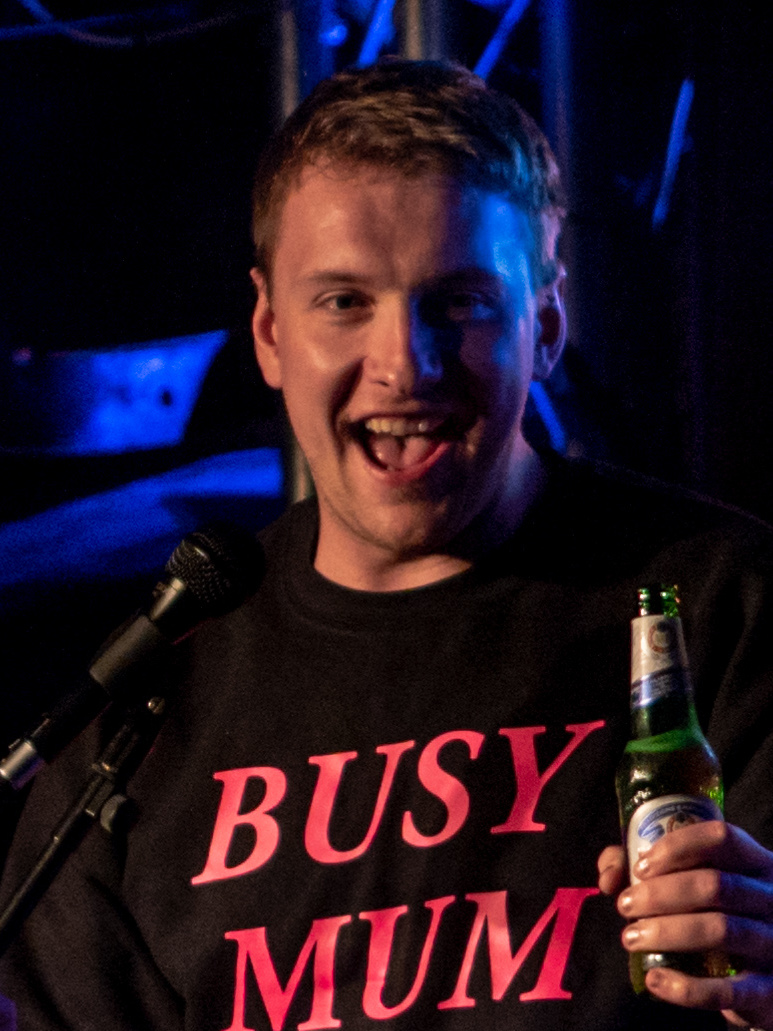
Comedian, painter and television presenter, Joe Lycett

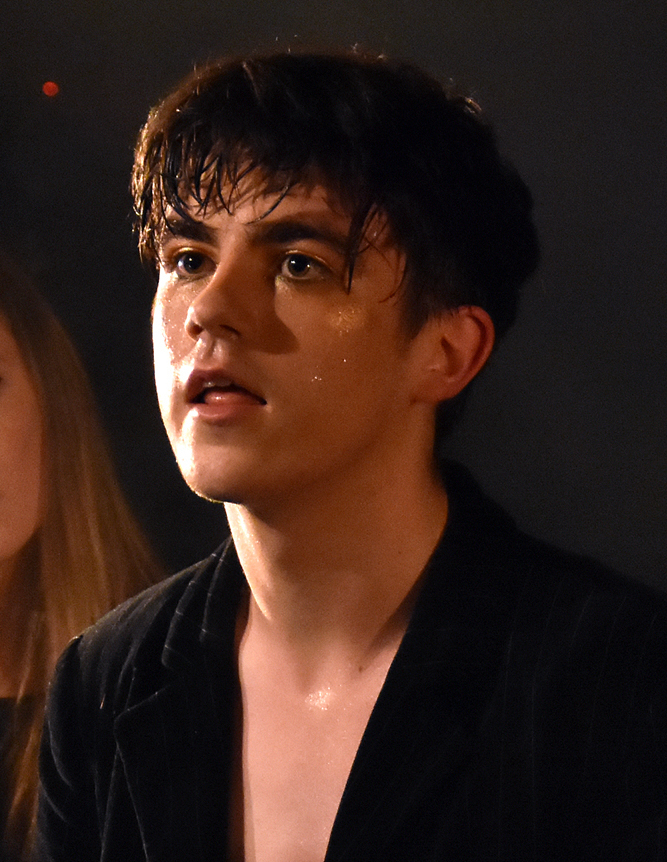
Singer-songwriter, Declan McKenna

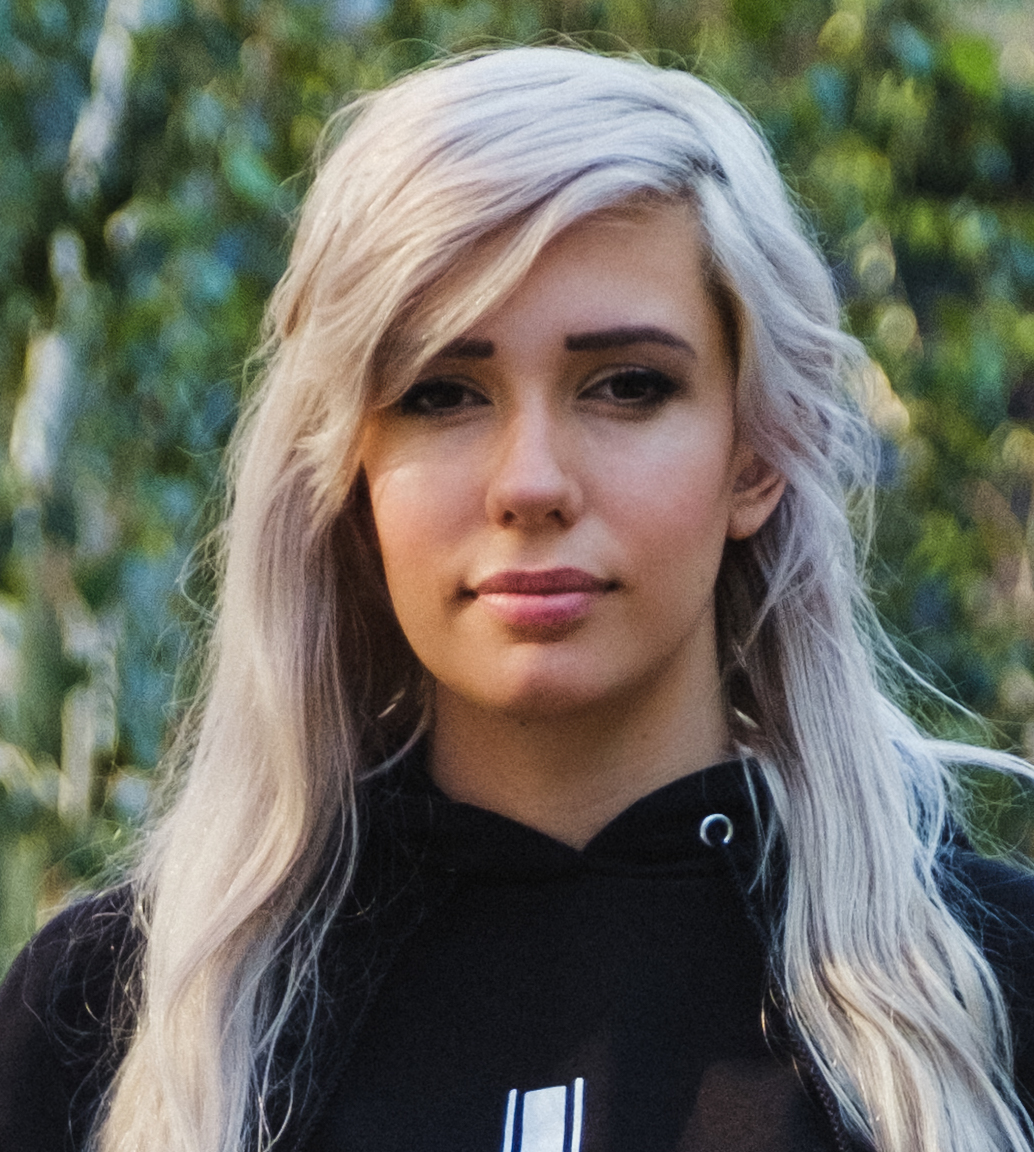
Video game writer and former journalist, Alanah Pearce

Name	Birth and death dates	Nationality	Comments	Reference
Courtney Act	Born 1982	Australian	Drag performer, singer	
Adeem the Artist	Born 1988	American	Singer	
Chen Aharoni	Born 1990	Israeli	Singer-songwriter, musician and television presenter	
Gillian Anderson	Born 1968	American	Actress and writer	
Sophie Anderson (actress)	1987–2023	English	Pornographic actress and internet personality	
Angèle (singer)	Born 1995	Belgian	Singer-songwriter	
Shiki Aoki	Born 1990	Japanese	Actor, voice actor, model, fashion designer	
Nadia Alexander	Born 1994	American	Actress	
Ashnikko	Born 1996	American	Singer-songwriter, rapper	
Madison Bailey	Born 1999	American	Actress	
Ivan Baron	Born 1999	Brazilian	Educator, disability rights activist	
Gian Bernardino	born 2001	Filipino	Singer-songwriter, actor, lead vocalist of Cup of Joe	
Alex Bertie	Born 1995	British	YouTuber, author, graphic designer	
Nayland Blake	Born 1960	American	Artist	
Bob the Drag Queen	Born 1987	American	Drag performer	
Jetty Bones	Born 1992	American	Singer-songwriter	
Boyfriend	Born 1988	American	Rapper, songwriter, producer, and performance artist	
Wayne Brady	Born 1972	American	Television personality, comedian, actor, and singer	
Brooke Candy	Born 1989	American	Rapper	
Ashly Burch	Born 1990	American	Voice actress, singer, writer	
Nicolas Cantu	Born 2003	American	Actor, voice actor, YouTuber	
Greta Christina	Born 1961	American	Blogger, speaker, and author	
Christine and the Queens	Born 1988	French	Singer-songwriter, pianist	
Rin Chupeco		Chinese Filipino	Writer	
Miley Cyrus	Born 1992	American	Singer-songwriter and actress	
Solo Darling	Born 1987	American	Professional wrestler	
Cara Delevingne	Born 1992	British	Model, actress and singer	
Carla Denyer	Born 1985	British	Politician. Self-describes as "bisexual or pansexual".	
Asia Kate Dillion	Born 1984	American	Actor	
Joanna Drozda	Born 1980	Polish	Actress, director	
Brita Filter	Born 1985	American	Drag queen	
Julia Fox	Born 1990	American	Actress, model, and media personality	
Reynaldo Gianecchini	Born 1972	Brazilian	Actor, model	
Preta Gil	Born 1974	Brazilian	Singer, television presenter, actress, businesswoman	
Girli	Born 1997	English	Singer-songwriter	
Caroline Giuliani	Born 1989	American	Filmmaker, political activist, writer	
Lily Gladstone	Born 1986	American	Actress	
Amber Glenn	Born 1999	American	Figure skater	
Mary González	Born 1983	American	Member of the Texas House of Representatives; became the first openly pansexual elected official in the United States in 2012	
Gigi Gorgeous	Born 1992	Canadian	YouTuber, socialite, actress and model	
Gottmik	Born 1997	American	Drag performer, make-up artist	
Laci Green	Born 1989	American	YouTuber	
Emily Hampshire	Born 1981	Canadian	Actress, singer	
Dalton Harris	Born 1991	Jamaican	Singer	
Kimberly Hart-Simpson	Born 1987	British/Welsh	Actress and businesswoman	
Sophie B. Hawkins	Born 1964	American	Singer-songwriter	
Angel Haze	Born 1992	American	Rapper and lyricist	
Clara Henry	Born 1994	Swedish	Blogger, comedian, television presenter and author	
Tess Holliday	Born 1985	American	Model, make-up artist, blogger	
Owen Hurcum	Born 1997	British	Politician	
Erika Ishii	Born 1987	American	Voice actor and television presenter	
Feminista Jones	Born 1979	American	Social worker, writer	
Jazz Jennings	Born 2000	American	Reality television personality, LGBTQ rights activist	
Denise Julia	born 2002	Filipino	Singer-songwriter, record producer, model	
Allie Katch	Born 1994	American	Professional wrestler	
Julia Kaye	Born 1998	American	Cartoonist, storyboard artist, and voice actress	
Amita Kuttner	Born 1990	Canadian	Astrophysicist and politician	
Kellyn LaCour-Conant		American	Restoration ecologist	
Ladycat De'Ore	Born 1982	American	Activist, drag performer	
Paige Layle	Born 2000	Canadian	Activist and eyelash technician	
Terra Lawson-Remer	Born 1978	American	Politician	
Paola Lázaro	Born 1994	Puerto Rican	Actress and dramatic playwright	
Lisa-Jayne Lewis	Born 1977	English	Broadcaster and commentator	
Danell Leyva	Born 1997	American	Gymnast	
Demi Lovato	Born 1992	American	Singer and actor	
Joe Lycett	Born 1988	British	Comedian	
Chella Man	Born 1998	American	Activist, YouTuber, artist, model, actor, writer	
Arienne Mandi	Born 1994	American	Actress	
Seanan McGuire	Born 1977	American	Author, filker	
Maria McKee	Born 1964	American	Singer-songwriter	
Declan McKenna	Born 1998	British	Singer, LGBT+ rights advocate, political activist	
Jena Malone	Born 1984	American	Actress	
Janelle Monáe	Born 1985	American	Singer-songwriter, rapper, record producer, actress, model	
Layla Moran	Born 1982	British	Member of House of Commons of the United Kingdom and in 2020 became the first UK parliamentarian to openly state their pansexuality	
Alanis Morissette	Born 1974	Canadian and American	Singer-songwriter	
Natasha Negovanlis	Born 1990	Canadian	Actress, singer	
Regina Orozco	Born 1964	Mexican	Actress and singer	
V Pappas	Born 1978/1979	Australian-American	Businessperson, former COO of TikTok	
Alanah Pearce	Born 1993	Australian	Writer, journalist	
Sarah Peters	Born 1987	American	Politician and environmental engineer	
Laurie Penny	Born 1986	English	Journalist and writer	
Griffon Ramsey	Born 1980	American	Artist	
Angel Rivera	Born 1997	Mexican-American	Pornographic actor and content creator	
Renato Russo	1960–1996	Brazilian	Singer-songwriter	
Patruni Sastry	Born 1992	Indian	Dancer, drag performer and actor	
Rina Sawayama	Born 1990	Japanese	Singer, musician	
Serguei	1933–2019	Brazilian	Singer, composer, artist	
Greg Smith	Born 1996	Canadian	Curler	
Tyler Spencer	Born 1972	American	Singer-songwriter, musician, author	
Caitlin Stasey	Born 1990	Australian	Actress	
James Stephanie Sterling	Born 1984	American	Journalist, YouTuber, video game critic	
Chris Stuckmann	Born 1988	American	Author, YouTuber, film critic, filmmaker	
Tove Styrke	Born 1992	Swedish	Singer-songwriter	
Bella Thorne	Born 1997	American	Actress, singer and writer	
Nadya Tolokonnikova	Born 1989	Russian	Activist, conceptual artist, musician	
Brendon Urie	Born 1987	American	Actor, musician, lead singer of Panic! at the Disco	
Katarina Waters	Born 1980	American	Wrestler, actress	
Dreya Weber	Born 1961	American	Actress, producer and aerialist	
Rebekah Weatherspoon		American	Author, romance novelist	
Mae Whitman	Born 1988	American	Actress, singer	
Adam Yosef	Born 1981	British	Journalist, photojournalist and political activist	
Yungblud	Born 1997	British	Singer-songwriter, actor	

== See also ==
- Lists of LGBT people
