= The Center on Colfax =

LGBTQ community center in Denver, Colorado

- Predecessor: Gay Coalition of Denver, Unity, Gay Community Center of Colorado
- Formation: 1976
- Type: Nonprofit
- Purpose: Community center for LGBTQ people
- Headquarters: 1301 E. Colfax Ave.
- Website: lgbtqcolorado.org

The Center on Colfax is a nonprofit organization that runs an LGBTQ community center in Denver, Colorado. The Center serves the LGBTQ community by providing programs and services, including mental health support, historical preservation, and community building.

== History ==
=== 1970s ===
The Center on Colfax was founded in 1976 and grew out of the advocacy work of the Gay Coalition of Denver (GCD). GCD held the "City Council Revolt" in 1973, which resulted in the Denver City Council repealing four discriminatory laws. The founders of GCD, were Gerald "Jerry" Gerash, Lynn Tamlan, Mary Sassatelli, Jane Dundee, and Terry Mangan. They met in apartments and members' homes at first before they got an official home.

The GCD office closed after a year in 1974 due to lack of funds. As Gerash wrote, “Still, some of GCD’s services and activities continued through the initiative of volunteers working from their homes, and through community meetings and events.” On October 24, 1974, GCD prevailed in its June 1973 lawsuit to halt discriminatory harassment of gays by police; plaintiffs were represented by Gerash, Daniel Bremer, Paul Hunter, Henry Toy, Milo Gonser, Kathy Bonham, William Reynard, and Kent Miller. With this success Gerash felt it was time to bring nine different gay groups together under one umbrella, proposing Unity as the name and the establishment of a gay community center. For a first meeting in early April 1975, Gerash drafted a four-point General Statement of Purpose, the last of which was “To work for the establishment of a Community Center for Gay People.” The twenty or so attendees from the nine groups voted unanimously to create Unity and the center.

The Gay Community Center of Colorado was incorporated in 1976. The Center officially opened in August 1977. To be more inclusive, the organization changed to the Gay, Lesbian, Bisexual, and Transgender Community Center of Colorado, and was eventually shortened to The Center.

The first Denver Pride Parade was also in 1975, and The Center was one of the original founders and producers.

=== 1980s ===
With the rise of the HIV/AIDS epidemic, The Center became more necessary than ever. The Center founded the Colorado AIDS Project in 1983. Original founders included Bob Engel, Donna Cecere, Tim Timmons, and Phil Nash, and Dave Holbrook was the original coordinator. The Colorado AIDS Project separated from The Center to become its own organization in 1984.

The Center published the Colorado Gay and Lesbian News from 1981 to 1984.

=== 1990s ===
Anti-gay sentiment in Colorado rose in the 1990s. In 1992, voters passed Amendment 2, which rescinded rights for LGBTQ people. Colorado Legal Initiatives Project (CLIP), which was the foundation for today’s Legal & Advocacy Program. The Supreme Court overturned Amendment 2 in 1996.

The Center started to receive support from the Gill Foundation.

The Center started an anti-violence campaign that eventually became independent, the Colorado Anti-Violence Project.

Lavender University and Rainbow Alley were community education programs started in the 1990s.

After 1989, The Center took over running the Denver PrideFest and it became the event that has continued into the 21st century. In 1990, the official attendance of Pridefest was 5000 people. In 1991, over 15,000 people attended, and in 1992, after Amendment 2 passed, over 30,000 people attended.

=== 2000s and today ===
In the 1980s, Services and Advocacy for GLBT Elders (SAGE) of the Rockies began to support elders.

In 2008, a transgender woman named Angie Zapata was murdered in Greeley, Colorado. This was followed by a wave of local LGBTQ activism.

In 2010, The Center moved to its current location in Capitol Hill.

== Rainbow Alley ==
Rainbow Alley is the youth program at the Center for youth ages 10-17, providing events, activities, and other resources for LGBTQ+ kids and their allies. These activities include art nights, drop-ins, and cooking classes among others. The program began with an age range of 12-21 in response to the growing number of youth present at the Denver PrideFest. Starting in 2007, the Center provided Youth Alley, a space at PrideFest with games, booths, and resources geared towards young LGBTQ+ folks. As Ashley Schoenbauer (communication and marketing manager as of June 2025) has described, Rainbow Alley provides a space for LGBTQ+ youth to feel loved and accepted. The program also hosts large events, like the annual Queer Prom, allowing youth more opportunities to feel welcomed in spaces from which they may have felt excluded. In recent years, Rainbow Alley has also held Pre-Pride parties during the day for folks to make signs, enjoy snacks, and be in community before city wide pride festivities begin. Rainbow Alley has also partnered with larger community centers, like the Denver Center for the Performing Arts, which included an original musical production of One Heart, United, written and performed by youth ages 11-21. In 2020, the program was also being supported by the local monthly drag performances organized by drag queen Jessica L’Whor titled, Drag for All Ages.

In 2024, after Donald Trump’s second presidential election win, Colorado’s LGBTQ+ community expressed the fear that was spreading across the nation particularly in relation to talks about cutting access to gender affirming care and healthcare. Trans and other gender diverse people especially sought support from centers and programs like Rainbow Alley, which Rex Fuller, CEO of The Center on Colfax, observed had experienced an increased number of gender-diverse participants. This fear among LGBTQ+ communities is particularly concerning and, for many, is the primary reason programs like Rainbow Alley are considered critical. As LGBTQ+ youth centers are underfunded, the sustainability of these programs has been shown to positively impact this currently targeted community.

== Colorado LGBTQ History Project ==
The Center established the Colorado LGBTQ History Project, which collects and preserves oral history from community members in the Denver area. The Terry Mangan Memorial Library holds over 2000 volumes of LGBTQ material, making it the largest library of LGBTQ material in the state.

== Awards ==
The Center hosts local awards such as the Pride in Business Award and the Visionary Award.

== Award Members ==
1. Ladycat De'Ore
