= Ali Shayegan =

Iranian politician

- علی شایگان
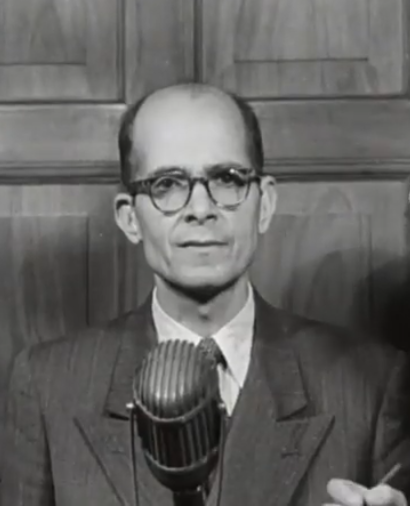
- Shayegan as Iran's envoy to the International Court of Justice hearing for Anglo-Iranian Oil Co. case, June 1951

Member of the Parliament
- In office 27 April 1952 – 16 August 1953
- Constituency: Tehran
- In office 25 April 1950 – 19 February 1952
- Constituency: Tehran

Minister of Culture
- In office 19 October 1946 – 10 December 1947
- Prime Minister: Ahmad Qavam

Personal details
- Born: 1 March 1903 Shiraz, Iran
- Died: 10 May 1981 (aged 78) Westwood, New Jersey, United States
- Resting place: Behesht-e Zahra
- Party: National Front (1949–1981); Democrat Party (1946–1948)
- Spouse: Badri Sheybani
- Children: Ahmad Shayegan, Hamid Shayegan, Maryam Shayegan, Leyli Shayegan
- Education: School of Political Science; Lyon University; University of Paris

Ali Shayegan (Persian: علی شایگان, romanized: ʿAli Šāygān; March 1, 1903 – May 15, 1981), was an Iranian politician and an opponent of Shah Mohammad Reza Pahlavi and lived in political exile in New York and New Jersey from 1958. Shayegan, one of the leaders of the National Front of Iran, was also a Member of Parliament, the Minister of Education and a close aide to Prime Minister Mohammed Mossadegh, whose government was overthrown by army officers loyal to the Shah in 1953 in a coup d'état orchestrated by the CIA. Following the coup, Hossein Fatemi, also a leader in the National Front and close associate of Shayegan was executed. Shayegan was initially sentenced to life imprisonment and then to ten years. After three years he was exiled to Europe and later came to America. He organized the Iranian National Front in Exile in New York in the late 1950s and helped in the formation of the Confederation of Iranian Students.

While in exile, he taught at the New School of Social Research in New York City and at Fairleigh Dickinson University in Teaneck, New Jersey. After the fall of the Shah in 1979, Shayegan returned to Iran and was mentioned as a possible candidate for the Presidency. He declined any nominations and took a stand against the Islamic Republic. In 1981, he returned to the United States, where he died shortly thereafter. A resident of River Edge, New Jersey, he died at the Pascack Valley Hospital in Westwood, New Jersey, after suffering a stroke, and his body was moved to Tehran to be buried.
