= Ladycat De'Ore =

American LGBTQ+ activist and drag queen

Vette Sternbeck (born 1977 or 1978), better known by her (Note: Sternbeck uses she/her and they/them pronouns. This article uses she/her for consistency.) drag name Ladycat De'Ore, is an American LGBTQ+ activist and drag queen based in Colorado. She has been active since the 1990s, with a particular focus on the rights of Black transgender women.

== Personal life ==
Sternbeck was born in Brooklyn, New York. Her father is from Trinidad and Tobago and her mother is from Barbados. Her aunt and niece are both lesbians.

Sternbeck is Black and pansexual.

== Career ==
Sternbeck has been active in activism since the implementation of "don't ask, don't tell" in the 1990s. She has worked as a mentor for LGBTQ+ youth for Rainbow Alley at the Center on Colfax, an LGBTQ+ nonprofit. She is involved with LGBTQ+ advocacy organizations in Colorado such as the Imperial Court of the Rocky Mountain Empire and One Colorado.

Sternbeck is also a drag performer. The name Ladycat was developed based on her high school's mascot.

== See also ==
- List of pansexual people
