= V Pappas =

Australian-American business executive

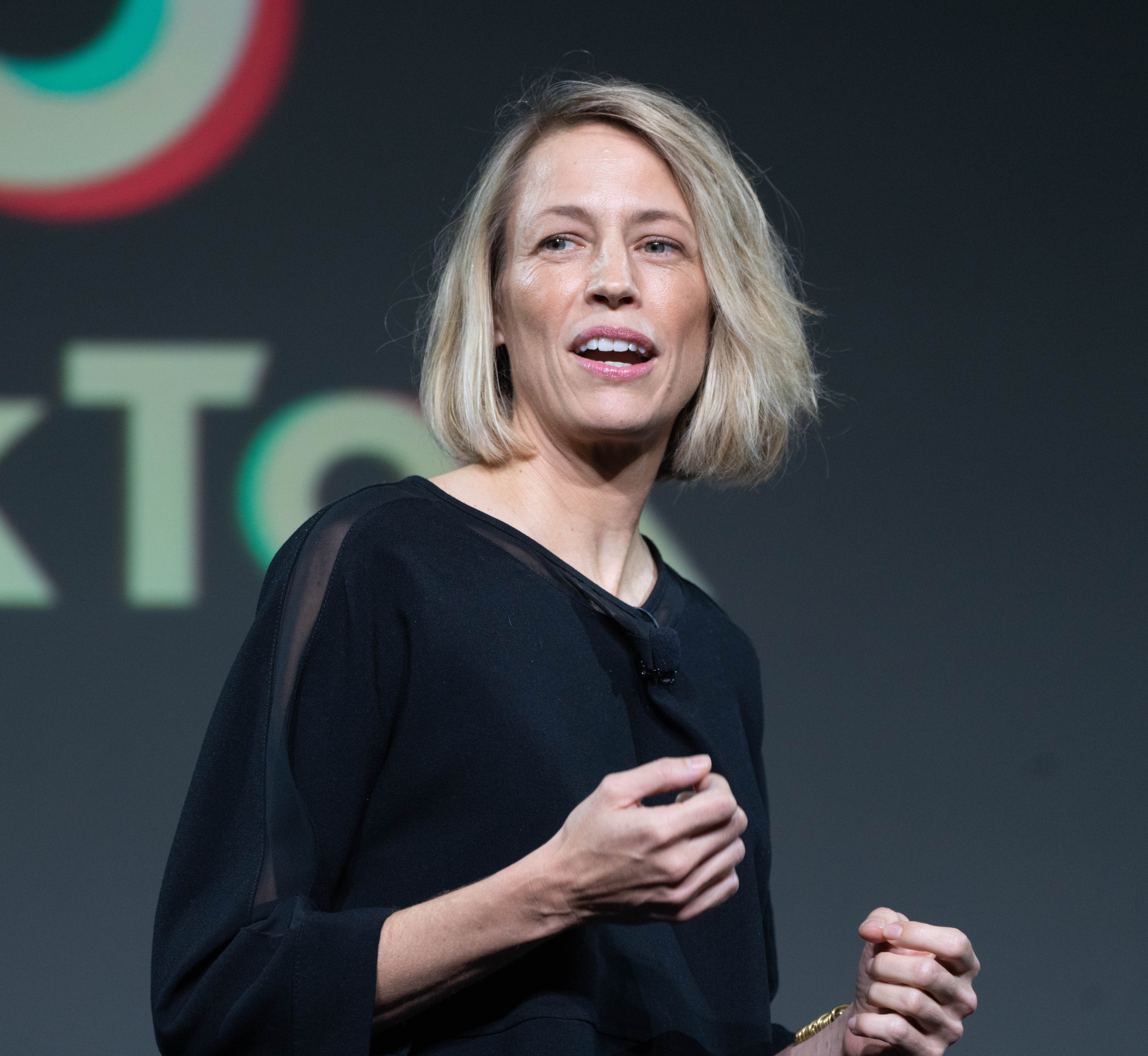
- Pappas in 2022
- Born: Vanessa Pappas; 1978 or 1979 (age 46–47); Darwin, Northern Territory, Australia
- Education: University of Queensland; The New School
- Board member of: Paley Center for Media; Simon & Schuster
- Children: 2

V Pappas (born c. 1978), also known as Vanessa Pappas, is an Australian-American business executive who was the chief operating officer (COO) at TikTok. Pappas previously held executive positions at Next New Networks and YouTube, and has served on the board of directors of Simon & Schuster and the board of trustees of the Paley Center for Media.

== Early life and education ==
Vanessa Pappas was born in 1978 or 1979 in Darwin, Northern Territory, and raised in Brisbane, Queensland. Their father is Greek. After receiving their first computer at approximately age 10–12, Pappas began learning basic coding in high school.

They lived in Australia until the age of 20. They earned Master of Arts degrees in media from the University of Queensland in Brisbane and The New School in New York City, graduating from the latter in 2007.

== Career ==
Early in their career, Pappas was the director of entertainment programming for Next New Networks, starting in 2007. The company was acquired by YouTube in 2011. Pappas became YouTube's first head of audience development, and later the global head of creative insights. They also created the YouTube Creator Playbook, described as a blueprint for how to be successful on YouTube. Pappas was with YouTube for approximately eight years.

Pappas first joined TikTok parent company ByteDance as a strategic advisor in 2018 according to Linkedin, and became TikTok's general manager for the U.S. one month later. In July 2019, Pappas was promoted to the role of general manager for North America, Australia, and New Zealand. Pappas was appointed TikTok's interim global head in August 2020, taking over the lead role at the company after U.S. President Donald Trump had issued an executive order to ban TikTok. Pappas was a vocal opponent against the threat of the ban. In 2021, Pappas was appointed chief operating officer (COO), a role Pappas held until they stepped down in 2023. During their tenure, Pappas was seen as a public face for TikTok in the U.S., and represented the company at a U.S. Senate hearing in late 2022. They also helped launch TikTok's Content Advisory Council and Creator Diversity Collective to address issues related to online safety and diversity, respectively. Pappas continued to advise TikTok after resigning from the role of COO.

== Recognition ==
Pappas was included in Bloomberg's 50 Most Influential list in 2021, as well as Vogue Australia's list of 21 "Australian women who defined 2021". They were also named Digital Executive of the Year by Adweek in 2021, and included in Fortune's 2022 list of the most powerful women. Pappas was included in Los Angeles Business Journal's LA500 list in 2022 and 2023, and ranked second on Fast Company's Queer 50 list of "LGBTQ women and nonbinary innovators in business and tech".

== Board service ==
Pappas has served on the board of directors of Simon & Schuster, as well as the board of trustees of the Paley Center for Media.

== Personal life ==
After leaving Australia, Pappas lived in London, England, for four years, then moved to the U.S. They lived in New York City while working at YouTube, and relocated to Los Angeles to work for TikTok.

Pappas identifies as "being both a woman and non-binary". They came out as non-binary in 2023, and use the pronouns they/them and she/her. Pappas is pansexual and married with two children.

== See also ==
- List of New School people
- List of pansexual people
- List of people from Darwin
- List of people with non-binary gender identities
- List of University of Queensland people
