= Gay Coalition of Denver =

- Successor: Gay Community Center of Colorado, The Center on Colfax
- Established: 1972
- Founder: Gerald "Jerry" Gerash, Lynn Tamlin, Mary Sassatelli, Jane Dundee, and Terry Mangan.
- Dissolved: 1977
- Purpose: Gay liberation

The Gay Coalition of Denver (1972-1977) was a gay liberation organization founded in Denver, Colorado. GCD was central for the gay community, and offered services like doctor referrals, counseling, and a phone hotline. They led the City Council Revolt in October 1973, in which the Denver City Council repealed Denver laws that targeted the gay community.

== Foundation ==
In 1972, the Gay Coalition of Denver (GCD) was founded by five members in order to fight back against police harassment.

The original founders were Gerald "Jerry" Gerash, Lynn Tamlin, Mary Sassatelli, Jane Dundee, and Terry Mangan. The group was non-hierarchical, and rotating chairs provided leadership. They met in apartments to plan legal strategy to address police harassment and raids on gay bars. Their first headquarters was at 1454 or 1460 Pennsylvania St. Some of the members had experience in social movements for Black civil rights, women's rights and anti-Vietnam war actions, but most people had never been to a political meeting or participated in a demonstration before.

GCD acted as a community center, since there were very few locations outside bathhouses and bars where the LGBTQ community could meet. GCD had a coffee house called Approaching Lavender, which was housed by Denver Free University.

The GCD developed committees to address issues, including political and legal committees. These focused on the harassment of gays by the Denver Police Department. DPD targeted the gay community through raiding gay bars and arresting people for dancing or kissing or for "lewd and lascivious" behavior. Additionally, police officers approached gay men and initiated sexual conversations, then arrested the target once they agreed to go home with them. Vice Squad leader Captain Jerry Kennedy was named as one who was particularly adamant.

In 1972, Colorado repealed its sodomy laws, but the city of Denver retained its laws and cops continued to target gays.

== "Johnny Cash Special" ==
In January or February 1973, the Denver Police Department introduced a large tour bus with a marquee that read "Johnny Cash Special." The bus drove around downtown Denver in the popular gay cruising areas. The driver stood outside to invite targets to get on the bus for free Johnny Cash concert tickets. Once inside, the driver solicited the target, and once they acquiesced, uniformed policemen jumped out and arrested the target. Police commanded the targets to lay quietly in the back so that they could repeat the process, which would continue until the bus was full enough to go back to the police station.

Between January and March, 380 gay men were arrested in this operation. Simply agreeing to a proposition made by an officer was grounds for arrest on "making a lewd offer." Records showed that 100% of arrests for lewdness were gay men, and 99% were not initiated by the public, but by police.

== Denver City Council Revolt ==
After the "Johnny Cash Special" was publicized, the Gay Coalition of Denver members began a campaign to repeal the criminal code. They published leaflets, hosted lectures, held press conferences, called councilmen, and sent speakers to various schools and universities. Their goal was to repeal four city ordinances: Lewd Act, Loitering for Sexual Deviant Purposes, Renting a Room for Sexual Deviant Purposes, and an Anti-Drag law.

In 1973, GCD sued the city of Denver and organized a protest at City Council. The civil lawsuit allowed GCD discovery that included the court records showing police were targeting gay men in a discriminatory manner.

On October 23, 1973, GCD members and 300 community members attended the Denver City Council meeting. Their goal was to overturn four laws that targeted the gay community: laws against loitering, cross-dressing, police entrapment, and renting out rooms for "sexual deviant purpose." 36 people signed up to speak at the meeting. The chamber was standing room only, and protesters waited for hours for the meeting to begin. The City Council president Robert Koch was opposed to the protest. He only gave them 30 minutes to speak, and after applause for the first speaker, threatened dismissal to anyone who disrupted the meeting with arrest and detention using the three Sheriff buses waiting outside.

The council became more receptive to the speakers as the meeting went on, especially as they saw the statistics. Two councilors, Irving Hook and Elvin Caldwell, advocated to extend the meeting until 1 A.M. so that everyone could speak.

At the next City Council meeting on November 12, the council repealed two of the four laws, and at the next meeting on November 19, they repealed the final two.

This was a landmark moment for the LGBTQ community, as the first time the community formed a group and convinced a city to repeal anti-gay laws.

In 1974, Gerash won the lawsuit against the city. The court determined that police cannot enforce laws discriminating against gay people, and the police appointed a liaison to the GCD. This was the first LGBTQ+ police liaison in the state.

== Legacy ==
The momentum from the City Council revolt mobilized the gay community. After the City Council revolt, Dale Bently, owner of a San Francisco bathhouse, gave seed money to Gerash to continue the work of the GCD. Their offices were in a house owned by the First Unitarian Society of Denver. In 1975, Gerash used the seed money and brought together eight gay and lesbian groups across the city to form a new group called Unity. By 1977, there were 39 groups associated with the Gay Community Center of Colorado, which is now The Center on Colfax.

In 2023, Gerash made a documentary about the City Council Revolt called Gay Revolt at Denver City Council and the Beginnings of an Organized Gay Community.
