= Benjamin Shwadran =

Israeli academic

- בנימין שוואדראן
- Born: 1907; Old City of Jerusalem
- Died: 2001 (aged 93–94)
- Education: The Hebrew University of Jerusalem; Clark University
- Scientific career
- Fields: Middle Eastern Studies
- Workplaces: New School for Social Research, Dropsie College, Yeshiva University, Hofstra University, Tel Aviv University, and The Hebrew University of Jerusalem

Benjamin Shwadran (Hebrew: בנימין שוואדראן; 1907 – 2001) was an author and professor of Middle Eastern studies. He was born in the Old City of Jerusalem. Shwadran went to the United States in 1927 and completed his studies at Clark University in Worcester, Massachusetts, where he received a doctorate in 1945. Shwadran first taught Middle Eastern studies at the New School for Social Research in New York, and then as professor of Middle Eastern studies and director of the Middle East Institute at Dropsie College and Yeshiva University. Shwadran then taught as a professor of political science at Hofstra University. In 1973, he retired to Jerusalem, and continued to teach as a professor of modern Middle East history at Tel Aviv University and The Hebrew University of Jerusalem.

His major books include The Middle East, Oil, and the Great Powers (1955, 1959, and 1973), Jordan, A State of Tension (1959; The University of Chicago Press), The Power Struggle in Iraq (1960), and Middle East Oil Crises since 1973 (1986).
