= Lani Adeoye =

Nigerian designer

- Born: Nigeria
- Education: McGill University (Commerce), Parsons School of Design
- Occupations: Designer; former Strategy Consultant
- Known for: Founder of Studio Lani; first African winner of SaloneSatellite competition
- Awards: SaloneSatellite Award (2022)
- Website: studiolani.com

Lani Adeoye is a Nigerian-Canadian interdisciplinary designer. She became the first African designer to win the SaloneSatellite competition. Her work has been featured in Elle Décor, Wallpaper, Azure and Architectural Digest. She was also named in Elle Décor’s 2020 list of "Women of the World: 75 Global Female Designers.

She is the founder of Studio Lani, a design practice known for its work across design disciplines, including sculpture, furniture, lighting, fashion, and assistance devices.

Her works have been acquired by Vitra Design Museum, the Montreal Museum of Fine Arts and Die Neue Sammlung. She is also a visiting professor at Parsons – The New School of Design.

== Career ==
She founded Studio Lani, an artisanal-driven studio focused on Designing Craft Futures. The studio draws inspiration from the tapestry of West African cultural heritage.

In addition to her studio work she is also an adjunct professor at Parsons. Before Parsons, Adeoye attended McGill University in Canada where he studied commerce. After graduation, she joined the global consulting firm Accenture as a Strategy Consultant where she used her triple concentration in information systems, strategy and marketing.

=== Works ===
One of Adeoye's works is the RemX Walker, a sculptural, asymmetrical walker designed to challenge the clinical aesthetics of traditional mobility aids. Inspired by her grandfather's experience with conventional walkers, Adeoye sought to create a functional and dignified design, winning the First Prize in Milan's 2022 SaloneSatellite: "Designing for Our Future Selves" competition.

In addition to the RemX Walker, Adeoye’s EKAABO Collection debuted at Salone del Mobile in Milan in 2022. Her collection featured ighting and furniture pieces incorporating various traditional Nigerian materials such as Aso-oke, bronze, and woven leather, reimagined with contemporary design sensibilities.

Adeoye’s work has also included the Talking Stools collection, which draws inspiration from the West African talking drums and re imagines traditional floor matts as upholstery fabric. She collaborates with artisans, including women matt weaving communities, to preserve sustainable traditional crafts and translate them to contemporary designs.

She has also served as a Juror for many awards including Dezeen Awards in 2023, IF Design in 2024 and 2025.

=== Awards and recognition ===
Her work has been featured in publications, including Architectural Digest, Elle Décor, Wallpaper, and The New York Times. Adeoye was also named in Elle Décor’s 2020 list of "Women of the World: 75 Global Female Designers Worth Celebrating.

And she has been published in publications including three books by Phaidon: Designed For Life, Woman Made and 1000 Design Classics and Designing Design Education’ by the IF Design Foundation.

Several of Adeoye’s works have been acquired by institutions, including the Vitra Design Museum in Germany, the Montreal Museum of Fine Arts in Canada, and Die Neue Sammlung in Munich, Germany.

=== Design approach ===
Adeoye’s design approach focuses on sustainability and the integration of traditional West African craft techniques with contemporary design practices. Adeoye's work often incorporates materials and methods influenced by everyday life in Nigeria, including elements such as the intricate hairstyling techniques found in Lagos. Drawing on her Nigerian heritage, she reinterprets traditional materials and techniques in contemporary forms, with the goal of broadening the understanding of West African design in modern contexts.
