= Rosemary Cove =

American sculptor

- Born: January 11, 1936 (age 90); New York City
- Education: Parsons
- Known for: Sculptor
- Awards: Ford Foundation Grant, National Endowment for the Arts, New York State Council for the Arts Grant

Rosemary Cove is an American sculptor. She was born on January 11, 1936, in New York City.

Rosemary Cove is best known for her work with Corten Steel, clay and wax. She also creates painting and collage. Her subject is primarily the female form. Cove has received a Ford Foundation Grant, National Endowment for the Arts Residency Grant, New York State Council for the Arts Grant, and National Endowment for the Arts Invitational Residency. In 2005, the Ann Norton Sculpture Gardens held a major retrospective of Rosemary Cove’s sculpture and collage.

Rosemary Cove lives and works in New York City.
