= Louis Vaczek =

Hungarian-Canadian-American novelist and science writer (1913–1983)

Louis Vaczek (16 November 1913 – 30 September 1983) was a Hungarian-Canadian-American author who published several novels in the 1950s and 1960s and who was also a science writer and editor as well as a teacher.

== Early life, education, and early career ==
Vaczek was born in Budapest, when it was part of the Austro-Hungarian Empire, in 1913. He was the son of Louis and Johanna Szvoboda Vaczek and he had a younger sister Joan. The father was a diplomat for Hungary, and so the family moved around a lot. They lived in Sopron in Western Hungary for a while after World War I, and then in the United States for a period in the early-mid 1920s when the father was assigned to the Hungarian Consulate in Cleveland, Ohio. After that, the father was posted to the Hungarian Consulate General in Montréal in Canada: accordingly Vaczek spent the remainder of his childhood years there, years considered formative.

He attended McGill University in Montréal, where he studied chemistry, graduating from there in 1935, with a B.Sc. degree. He also became a naturalized Canadian citizen in 1935. Also in 1935, his father was transferred from Montreal to Egypt, and Vaczek followed to the Middle East, where in Egypt he worked as a manager in a chemicals factory and where in Saudi Arabia he served as a government relations staffer for Standard Oil and as a director for the company of the British Arabist Harry St John Philby. His sister Joan also moved to Egypt; she would publish a novel of her own with an Egyptian setting and would be married for a while to the writer Robert Arthur Jr., before settling in the United States for the balance of her life. Vaczek himself stayed in the Middle East through 1941.

== Military service, marriage and family ==
With World War II underway, Vaczek enlisted in the Royal Canadian Air Force in 1942. A pilot, he served as a flight instructor within Canada.

Also in 1942, he married Katharine Pfeiffer (1921–2004), a New Yorker who had graduated from Sarah Lawrence College. They would have two children, both born in the 1950s, but would divorce in 1958.

== Writing and teaching career ==
=== Early novels ===
Following Vaczek's discharge from the RCAF, Vaczek and his wife lived in a log cabin in the Canadian North Woods during much of 1946. Then in parts of the year 1947, Vaczek studied journalism at Carleton College in Ottawa. During those studies he became interested in the history of settlers in the North Woods and Hudson Bay. The couple then moved to Paris, France for a period, while Vaczek began a career as a writer.

Vaczek's debut novel, River and Empty Sea (1950), was a work of historical fiction, a 17th-century account of a sieur on an expedition into Hudson Bay and who found himself in a search for greater meaning. In order to increase the realism of the portrayal, Vaczek took a canoe trip over the protagonist's route and also studied the records of 17th century Jesuits at Columbia University in New York. River and Empty Sea was praised by reviewers for its verisimilitude although there was concern that the pace of the work was slow.

Vaczek subsequently immigrated to the United States. By 1951, Vaczek and his wife were living in the Gramercy Park neighborhood of Manhattan in New York.

In contrast, Vaczek's second novel, The Frightened Dove, published in 1951 under the pseudonym Peter Hardin, was a tale of intrigue set in the aftermath of World War II with much of the action taking place in Montreal. A paperback edition was released the following year, with alluring if misleading cover art.

=== Editor and teacher ===
From 1965 to 1972, Vaczek was a senior science editor for the Encyclopædia Britannica, where he was in charge of the creation of entries concerning the physical sciences. Earlier, he had worked as a science editor for the Grolier Encyclopedia and at the The American Heritage Dictionary.

Vaczek was a longtime teacher at the The New School for Social Research in New York, working there from 1958 to 1965 and again from 1980 to 1983. Courses he taught there in his first stint included "Introduction to Chemistry" and "Short Story Workshop". During his second stint, classes he taught included "Fiction Workshop". In between, he taught at Roosevelt University in Chicago, from the years 1967 to 1979. Other places he taught at in the New York area included Bennett College and the preparatory Scarborough Day School and Barnard School for Boys.

Vaczek died of leukemia, at age 69, in New York on September 30, 1983.

== Works ==
- River and Empty Sea (Thomas Allen Limited, 1950) [in the United States by Houghton Mifflin, 1950]
- The Frightened Dove (Charles Scribner's Sons, 1951) [paperback Bantam Books, 1952] [under pseudonym Peter Hardin]
- The Hidden Grave (Harper, 1955) [paperback Dell, 1956] [under pseudonym Peter Hardin]
- The Golden Calf (William Sloane Associates, 1956)
- The Troubadour (William Sloane Associates, 1960)
- The Enjoyment of Chemistry (Viking Press, 1964) [softcover, Penguin Books, 1968]
- Travelers in Ancient Lands: A Portrait of the Middle East, 1839–1919 (New York Graphic Society, 1981) [co-author with Gail Buckland]
