= Sofubi =

Japanese style of art toy

Sofubi (ソフビ) is a type of Japanese toy made from soft vinyl that first began to be produced in the 1950s and 1960s, typically being modeled after popular kaiju and tokusatsu series of the time period. In the 1990s, sofubi shifted to largely being a type of art toy associated with street fashion brands in Ura-Harajuku. These designer sofubi toys are primarily made by independent artists in limited quantities and sold to collectors at exhibitions around the world.

== Description ==
Sofubi toys are made from often brightly-colored PVC, and tend to be made in a variety of different sizes. While they can be based on all kinds of things, particularly common subjects include kaiju, tokusatsu, and figures from Japanese mythology such as yōkai and the maneki-neko. They are differentiated from other PVC toys by the culture surrounding them – as opposed to mass-produced toys, sofubi figures are often made by individual artisans in limited quantities. Some toys have special gimmicks, such as glitter or phosphorescence. Some companies specialize in "retro-style" sofubi toys.

== History ==
Sofubi began to rise in popularity in Japan following World War II due to the affordability compared to that of other materials such as wood or tin. The first soft vinyl doll to be manufactured in Japan is believed to be Masudaya's 1953 milk-drinking doll. In that same year, the United States banned the use of flammable celluloid materials in products, which led to many Japanese toy companies that exported to the US switching to soft vinyl.

As kaiju rose in the 1960s, sofubi figures began to experience a popularity boom as well, with many toys at the time being modeled after kaiju such as Godzilla, and tokusatsu series like Ultraman. In 1966, the company Marusan Shōten, known for making tin toys in the 1950s, first released their soft vinyl kaiju figures to line up with the recent popularity of Ultra Q. In the mid-1970s, the kaiju boom began to die down, and with it, so did sofubi's popularity. However, in the 1980s, people who had grown up with sofubi kaiju toys began to collect them as vintage items, causing demand for sofubi to grow once more, with Marusan beginning to sell reproductions of their '60s and '70s sofubi toys – aided by television programs about antique appraisal that began to show old sofubi toys being valued at high prices.

Designer sofubi started to emerge in the 1990s, largely being instigated by men's street fashion brands in Ura-Harajuku that would sell the toys, such as Bounty Hunter. They would take on a collectible status within urban culture, similarly to other items such as sneakers. Independent sofubi continued to increase in popularity into the 2000s, taking influence from street style trends from the US West Coast, and the art toy movement in Hong Kong.

Overseas interest in sofubi began to rise in the 2010s, with Marusan noting an increase in 2017. The company began to do business internationally, telling DEEPTOKYO Magazine about an event they attended in Taiwan, and pop-up shops they had recently done in Mexico and the United Kingdom. In 2014, Medicom Toy launched their Vinyl Artist Gacha series, which consists of smaller, mass-produced versions of popular sofubi artists' designs, distributed through gashapon machines and blind boxes.

== Culture ==
Sofubi has become a subcultural movement in Japan, typically being primarily made for adult collectors rather than as children's playthings. The movement has drawn inspiration from various sources, including ero guro nansensu, graffiti, shunga, tattoos, Lowbrow art, Superflat, and folk toys such as kokeshi. Social media connections are important in sofubi circles, as fans use these platforms to show off their collections and artists use them to announce new products and what events they'll be attending. While being interviewed for a Tokyo Weekender article, popular sofubi artist Izumonster explains, "If you want to know how to buy them, follow everyone’s accounts". The limited releases of sofubi toys have significantly contributed to their popularity with collectors. The culture is highly collaborative – independent artists are often assisted in production and distrubtion by larger companies such as Medicom Toy, which was founded in 1996 and primarily produces sofubi. Sofubi toys have a significant female following, with notable artists in the subculture such as Konatsu, Chiba, and Kaori Hinata being female themselves. Some sofubi production companies are family businesses. Sofubi is also collected and produced in other countries, including the United States, France, and especially other Asian countries such as Hong Kong and Taiwan. Sofubi creators and fans gather at conventions and events around the world such as the Taipei Toy Festival and the London Toy Fair in order to sell, trade, and show off limited edition sofubi. In Japan, sofubi is often sold at events like the art expo Design Festa and the anime figure-centric event Wonder Festival. One of the biggest events for sofubi collectors is Super Fest, which usually has a dedicated area for sofubi.

Like sneakers, sofubi toys are sometimes viewed as investments and "flipped" by online resellers. The rise in second-hand sales and flipping culture is a topic of concern among sofubi artists, who have tried to take measures to prioritize selling to collectors over resellers. Toy designer Candie Bolton tells The Japan Times: "In general it’s frowned upon to see a toy (at a resale shop) because it means the person who bought it doesn’t really want it."
