= Art toy =

Toys created by artists as collectibles

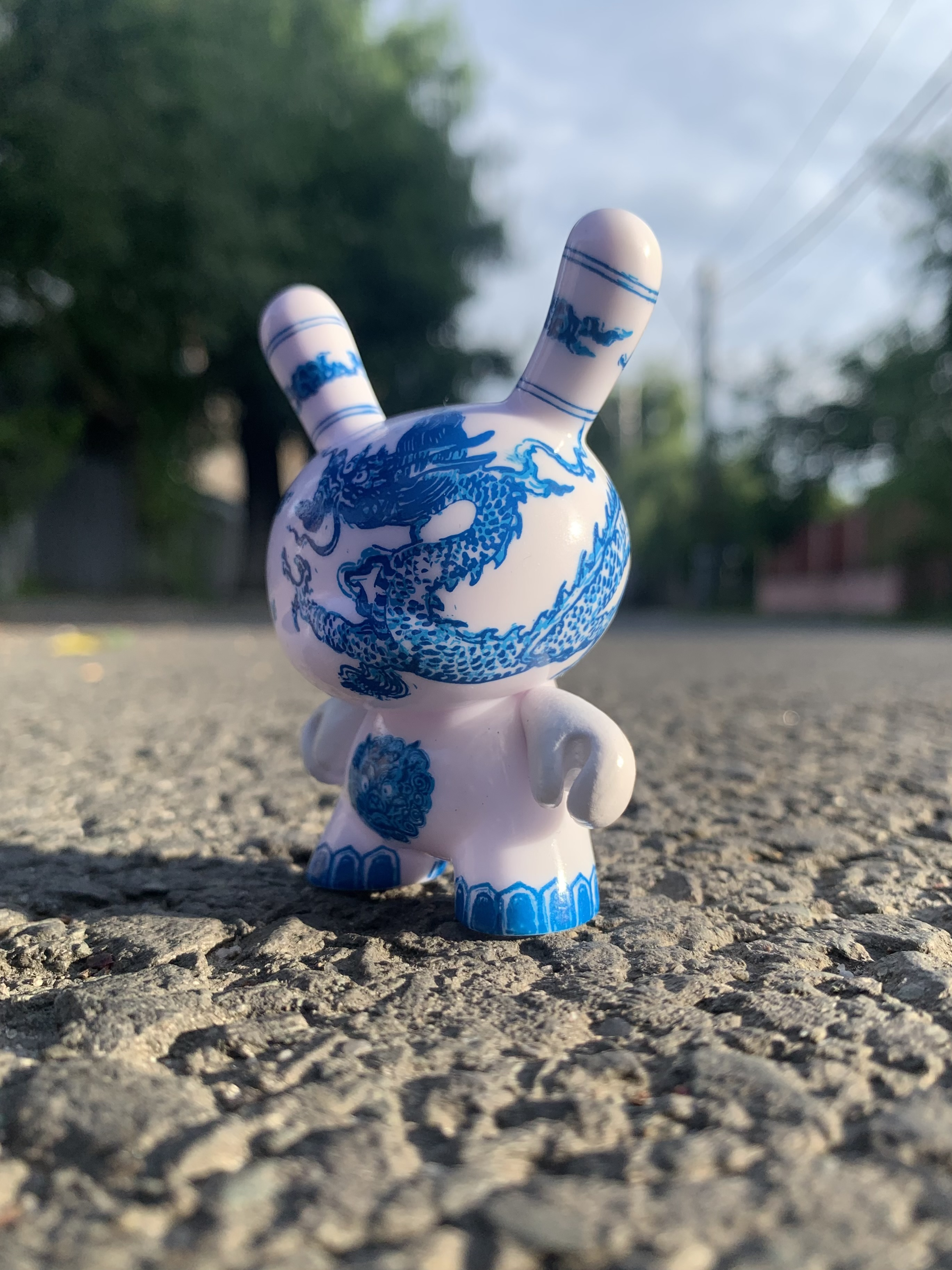
Dunny vinyl figure, part of a series produced by the Metropolitan Museum of Art, which portrays a dragon embroidered on a silk brocade door valance and side panels (Chinese, 17th-18th century) in the collection of the museum

Art toys, also called designer toys, are toys and collectibles created by artists and designers that are either self-produced or made by small, independent toy companies, typically in very limited editions. Artists use a variety of materials, such as ABS plastic, vinyl, wood, metal, latex, plush, and resin. Creators often have backgrounds in graphic design, illustration, or fine art, but many accomplished toy artists are self-taught. The first art toys appeared in the 1990s in Hong Kong and Japan. By the early 2000s, the majority of art toys were based upon characters created by popular Lowbrow artists, linking the two movements.

In his book Vinyl Will Kill!, illustrator Jeremyville, in Sydney, claims that the cultural phenomenon of designer toys began when Hong Kong–based artist Michael Lau took his customized G.I. Joe figures to a local toy show. He had reworked them "into urban hip-hop characters, wearing cool streetwear labels and accessories." Initially known as "urban vinyl", the accepted term soon became "designer toys".

== Overview ==
Kid Hunter and BxH Skull-Kun, released by Bounty Hunter (Harajuku, Japan Tokyo) in 1997 are the earliest examples of designer toys created by Hikaru Iwanaga.

A typical example of designer toys are the Qee series, produced in Hong Kong by Toy2R. The standard size of Qee figures is 2" high, but 8" and 16" figures are also produced. Qees vary in their design, usually with the same basic body type, but with head sculpts that may be of a bear, a cat, a dog, a monkey, or a rabbit. Variations of the Qee are the Toyer with a head that resembles a cartoon skull; the Knuckle Bear, which was created by Japanese character designer Touma, and resembles a graffiti-style caricature of an anthropomorphized bear; and the Qee Egg, a bird's egg with arms and legs. Blank Qees are produced in 2" and 8" sizes; these figures may be of any Qee sculpt, but are packaged unpainted, as do-it-yourself pieces. Each piece is designed by an artist and carries its own aesthetic theme. Each 2" figure is packaged with an optional keychain attachment.

Another example of designer toys is the Dunny series, produced by the American company Kidrobot. Dunny figures may be considered the Western counterpart of the Chinese Qee and the Japanese Bearbrick. Dunny are a series of figures that resemble anthropomorphized rabbits in a cartoon style (a design originally illustrated by graffiti, stencil, and comic artists) which are produced as 3", 8", and 20" figures. There is a variation of the Dunny figure called a Munny, which resembles a monkey, and is only sold as an unpainted do-it-yourself piece. Some creators of designer toys are Hong Kong–based Michael Lau, credited with the establishment of the Urban Vinyl movement; Devilrobots, a five-person design team from Japan, known for their television character named TO-FU Oyako; Mexican artists Carlos & Ernesto East "The Beast Brothers" which are known for their Dia de muertos and Aztec influences; American concert poster artist Frank Kozik's Mongers series and Labbit character; and British illustrator James Jarvis's cast of characters, produced as vinyl figures of varying sizes.

Most vinyl toys are produced in factories in China, though some designers have shifted production to Japan where higher quality materials such as clear vinyl are used. Designer toys are rarely produced in the United States due to environmental restrictions on vinyl production; some exceptions are resin and plush toys.

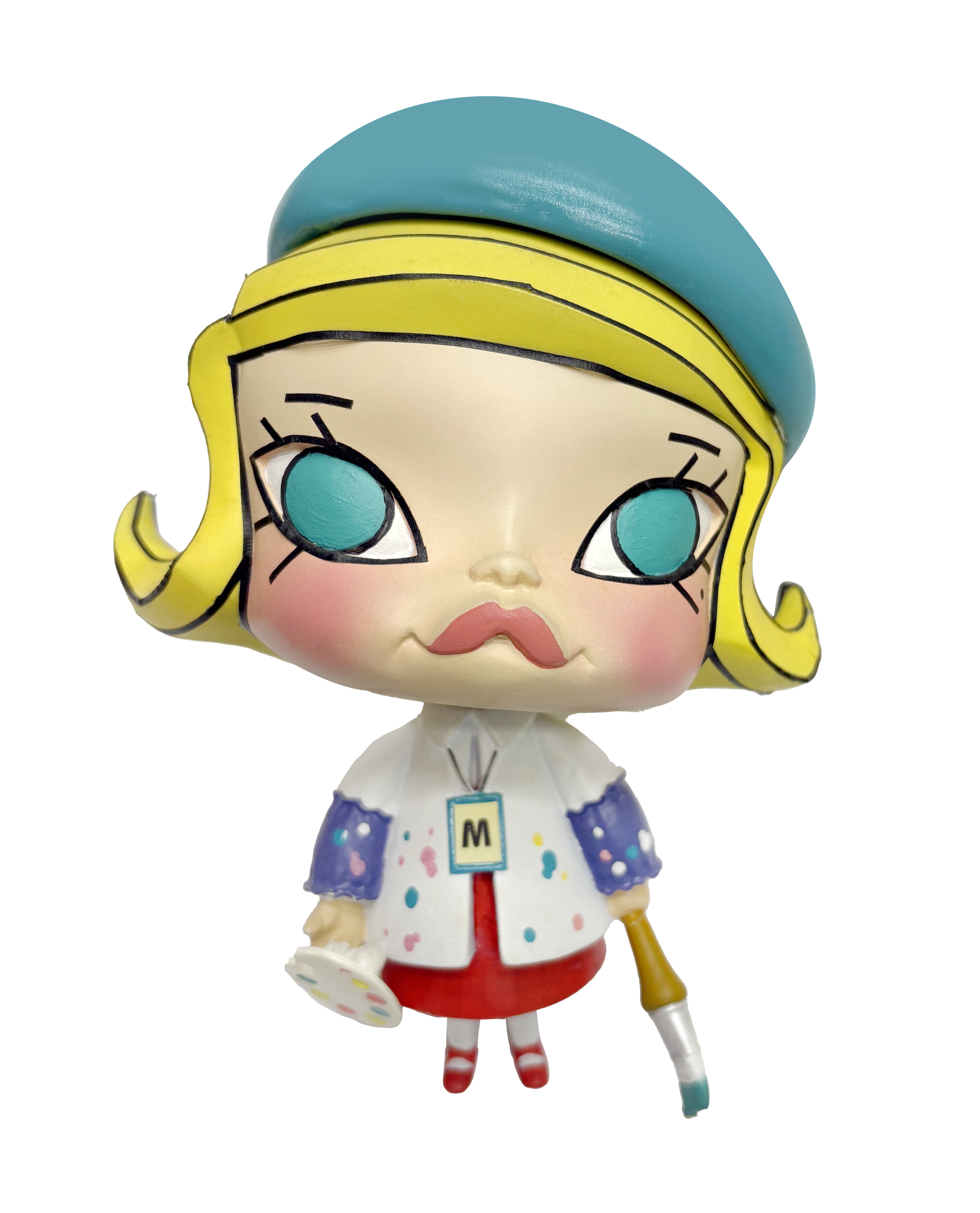
Art toy figurine named Molly

== Urban vinyl ==
Urban vinyl is a type of designer toy, featuring action figures in particular which are usually made of vinyl. Although the term is sometimes used interchangeably with the term designer toy, it is more accurately used as a modifier: not all designer toys can be considered urban vinyl, while urban vinyl figures are necessarily designer toys, by virtue of how they are produced. Like designer toys in general, urban vinyl figures feature original designs, small production numbers, and are marketed to collectors, predominantly adults.

What sets "urban" designer toys apart from general "designer" or "art" toys, is the subject matter. Anything dealing with graffiti, hip-hop, rap or other subjects typically tied to an urban environment.

The urban vinyl trend was initiated by artist Eric So & Michael Lau, who first created urban vinyl figures in Hong Kong in the late 1990s. Early designer toy creators include New York artist Ron English. Other creators of urban vinyl figures are Japanese artist and designer Takashi Murakami whose work has been exhibited in the Museum of Contemporary Art, Tokyo, and the Museum of Fine Arts, Boston, Australian designer Nathan Jurevicius's Scarygirl, based on characters from his comic of the same name, and produced in conjunction with Hong Kong company Flyingcat, and former graffiti artist KAWS.

Urban vinyl figures are designed primarily by illustrators, graffiti artists, musicians and DJs from urban areas in Asia (especially Japan and Hong Kong), North America (especially the United States), and Europe.

An offshoot of hip hop and youth-oriented popular culture, urban vinyl often depicts real-life figures from Asian and American culture, particularly artists who perform in a hip-hop or related styles. Two examples are Lau's depiction of the LMF rappers from Hong Kong, and figures based on the members of the virtual electronic band Gorillaz, produced by Jamie Hewlett and made by Kidrobot.

Urban vinyl is commonly designated as either Eastern Vinyl, including anything designed and produced in Asia or Australia, or Western Vinyl, encompassing pieces which are designed and produced in North America, South America, or Europe. Urban vinyl figures have become collectible items. Rare pieces may sell for hundreds or even thousands of dollars.

== Resin toys ==
Some artists create their toys using synthetic resin material and resin casting. After casting the resin toy receives adjustments in its details, sometimes being superficially cast on some parts. The toy can be finished using automotive paint by aerosol and sometimes receives a varnished layer above the dry painting.

The process of making resin toys is more labor-intensive and time-consuming than industrialized vinyl toy production, which in most of cases are made identical and in large quantities. But resin casting allows artists to produce toys in small numbers. Most vinyl factories will only produce toys in large series. Resin toys have become a way for less established artists to produce a toy without the large financial investment required to produce a vinyl toy. Unlike most vinyl toys, resin toys are usually sculpted, cast, and painted by a single artist as shown in the book "We are indie Toys" by HarperCollins ISBN 9780062293435.

== Designer plush ==
Designer plush, a subcategory of designer toys, are soft, stuffed dolls created in limited quantities by artists and designers. Common designs include anthropomorphized animals or fantastic human likenesses, although designer plush dolls often feature entirely unique character designs. Designer plush dolls are usually given names and personas, with their distinctive personalities described on their tags or in booklets included in their packaging.

One producer of designer plush is Friends With You, a commercial art and design collective based in Miami, Florida. Their work is characterized by a cute yet bizarre aesthetic, and exhibits a hand-made quality, even in pieces that are machine-made. In addition to their plush dolls, Friends With You also create modular wood toys, and motion graphics for companies such as Sony, MTV, Nike, and Columbia Records.

Another brand of designer plush are Uglydolls, created by independent toy designers David Horvath and Sun-Min Kim under the label Pretty Ugly. Their first products were 12" plush dolls based on drawings by David Horvath, and handmade by Sun-Min Kim. Pretty Ugly has also produced 7" versions of their character designs, called Little Uglys, 24" versions called Giant Uglys, 4" miniatures intended for use as keychains, and in a departure from the plush medium, 7" Vinyl Uglys. Ugly Dolls have been featured in motion pictures like Zarthura and in major specialty stores.

== Designer consumer electronics ==
A recent addition to the world of vinyl toys, designer consumer electronics is a subcategory started by mimoco, whose mimobot Art Toy Flash Drives proved that there was a market for Urban Vinyl products with a purpose. Like other platform art toys, there have been mimobot designs by a wide variety of artists, including Mori Chack, Sket One and Jon Burgerman. The appeal of designer consumer electronics in flash memory form tends to be the addition of a digital canvas, allowing affiliated artists to create much more in-depth characters, complete with animations, music, etc.

Designer consumer electronics are not limited to mimobots; in 2007, Medicom brought out a Be@rbrick USB flash drive.

== See also ==
- Disney Vinylmation
- Funko Pop!
- Gashapon
- Sofubi
- Model figure
- Treeson
- Kidrobot
- Kaws
