= Wednesday Campanella =

Japanese musical band

Wednesday Campanella 水曜日のカンパネラ
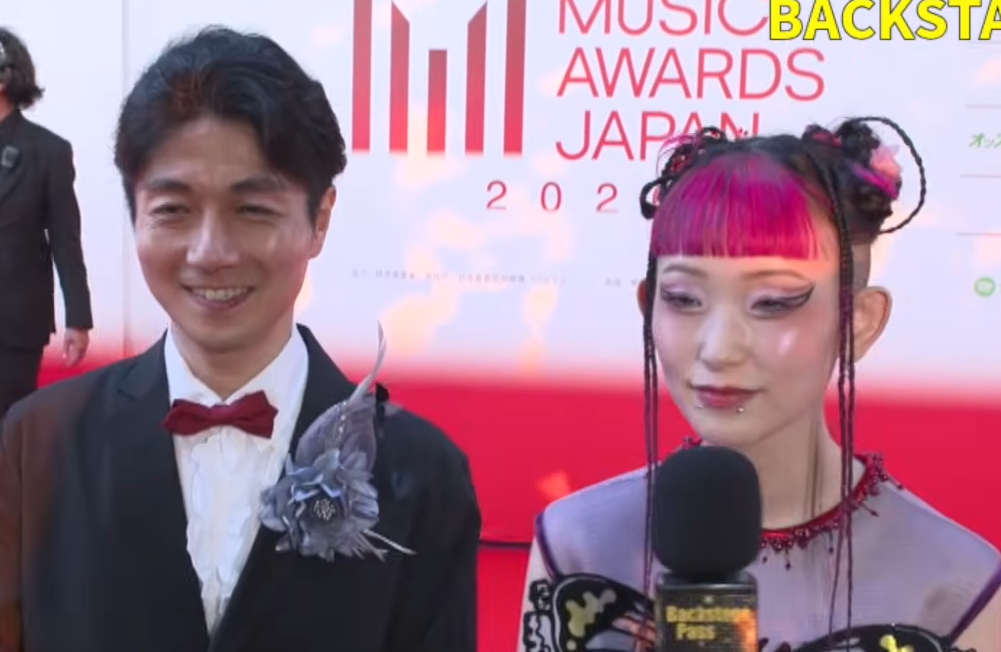
- Wednesday Campanella at the 2026 Music Awards Japan

Background information
- Also known as: Wednesday Campanella, Suiyōbi no Campanella
- Origin: Tokyo, Japan
- Genres: Electronic; EDM; J-pop; hip hop; house
- Years active: 2012—present
- Labels: Warner Music Japan, Tsubasa Records
- Members: Utaha; Kenmochi Hidefumi; Dir.F
- Past members: KOM_I
- Website: wed-camp.com

Wednesday Campanella (水曜日のカンパネラ, Suiyōbi no Kampanera) is a Japanese music group formed in 2012 combining musical genres such as EDM, J-pop, and hip hop into a unique stylistic blend. The lyrics generally follow a theme of famous or mythical people and creatures from history, pop culture, or various cultural folklore, while tangentially touching on the song's subject through the use of clever word play and creative interpretation. From 2013 until 2021, the trio consisted of KOM_I, Kenmochi Hidefumi, and Dir.F. KOM_I departed in September 2021, with new vocalist Utaha joining the group.

== History ==
=== Formation ===
In 2011, Dir.F and Kenmochi first met at Design Festa Tokyo. As a manager at Tsubasa Records label, Dir.F wanted to launch a new music project with provisional female members, while Kenmochi wanted to produce new music differing from his instrumental music under Nujabes's Hydeout Productions label after the 3.11 Disaster in Japan. The two decided to form a group and named the project ‘’Suiyōbi no Campanella’’. In 2012, Dir.F met KOM_I at a mutual videographer friend’s house party, and he invited her to join the group. KOM_I had no prior music experience until she joined and was still a high school student. Originally, Kenmochi and Dir.F envisioned the group as a trio of girls, but this idea was later abandoned. However, for their initial demo, a second female vocalist appears on the songs, but she is not credited or identified. The second vocalist would leave shortly after for unknown reasons, leaving KOM_I as the sole vocalist for the group. She was originally chosen because Kenmochi liked the mismatch between her voice and the house and hip hop-oriented music that he was producing for the group.

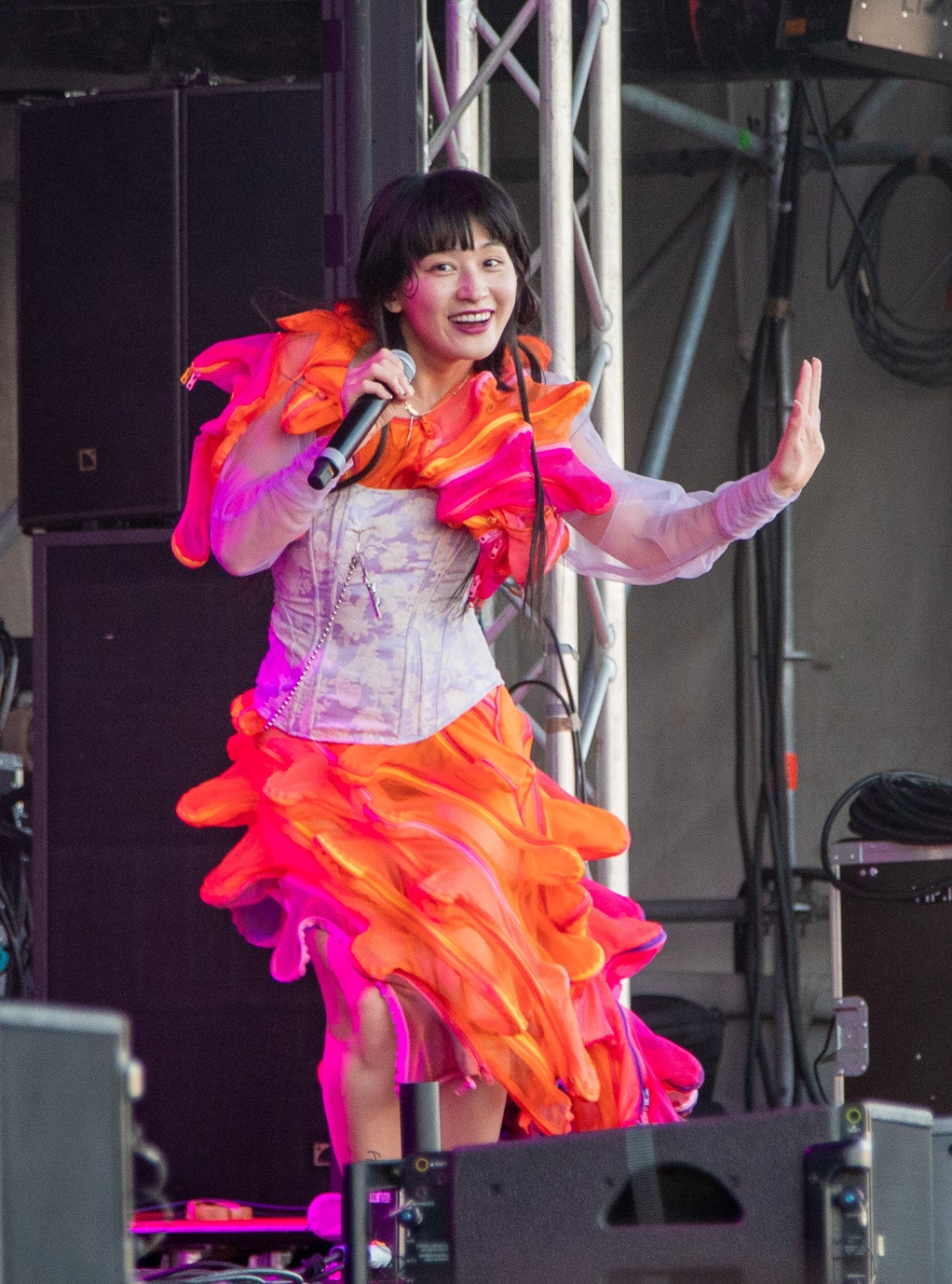
Former lead singer KOM_I performing at Primavera Sound in 2019

=== Career ===
The group uploaded its first two songs, "Oz" and "Kūkai", on YouTube in July 2012. Their debut demo release Suiyōbi no Campanella Demo 1 was sold at Design Festa Tokyo Autumn in November of the same year.

On March 11, 2013, KOM_I held her first live performances alone representing the group. It took place at Shimokitazawa ERA, a nightclub in Tokyo.

Their first mini-album entitled Crawl to Sakaagari (クロールと逆上がり) was released in May 2013. It was exclusively sold at Village Vanguard Shimokitazawa.

In September 2013, the group was invited to the Ringo Ongakusai Festival, a popular festival for Japanese musicians. KOM_I performed in several shows with "Ringo-ame Man," an apple candy-headed character. The following month, their second mini-album Rashomon (羅生門) was released and sold exclusively at Tower Records.

In March 2014, the group's third mini-album, Cinema Jack ("シネマジャック"), was released. The group conducted serial web interviews with online music store OTOTOY to promote the release of the album. Later in 2015, OTOTY would release an exclusive collaborative song from the group with Yuki Kawamura.

On August 5, 2014, the group debuted their most successful single to date "Momotarō" on J-Wave radio for their fourth mini album, Watashi wo Onigashima ni Tsuretette (私を鬼が島に連れてって, "Take me to Onigashima Island"), which was released on 5 November 2014 in die-cut CD edition.

In 2015, they released their first EP, Triathlon. Unlike the group's previous releases, the EP is the first to feature outside producers including Oorutaichi (who would later produce the entirety of "Yakushima Treasure" in 2019) and OBKR from the duo N.O.R.K. Later that year, the group's first full album, Zipangu, was released cementing their unique stylistic blend of genres. The album featured the song "Shakushain", which became a minor hit and featured a music video with stop-motion and other creative cinematographic tricks filmed across Sapporo, as the song's lyrics also revolved around attractions in Hokkaido. The album saw the group as quick and quirky up-and-comers on the fringes of the Japanese mainstream, resulting in more creative videos and commercial tie-ins, such as the song "Ra" with Nissin curry, "Medusa" with PARCO department stores, and "Nishi Tamao" with a Casio Trackformer XW-PD1.

In March 2016, KOM_I announced that their next album would be released around June at their first American show at SXSW in Austin, Texas. The mini-album entitled UMA, conceptually based upon unknown mythical animals, was released on 22 June 2016 under Warner Music Japan, their major label debut. Another American show followed in San Francisco, as well as part of Tyler, the Creator's Camp Flog Gnaw Carnival festival in Los Angeles. More international concerts were performed in Taipei, Hong Kong, Reims, and Kraków.

The single, SUPERKID, was released as a teaser for their first full album with the major label Warner, entitled SUPERMAN in 2017. A performance at the Nippon Budokan in March 2017 marked the group's largest show and highest budget production to date, along with a Blu-Ray released in July 2017. SUPERMAN featured one of the group's more well-known hits "Ikkyū-san" as well as singles "Aladdin" and "Sakamoto Ryōma".

After the release of SUPERMAN, the group began to stagger their new song releases that would later be largely collected the following year on theirGalapagos EP. KOM_I also collaborated with the Japanese Derby for the digital single "Melos", based on the short story Run, Melos!, and a live streaming concert entitled "Time to Play". Another follow-up release, entitled "Ei Sei", was made for a real-life adventure game based upon the Kingdom manga, which simultaneously took place across multiple prefectures. The song received a widespread digital release in June 2017. Throughout this time, both KOM_I and Kenmochi were weekly hosts of the Wednesday night broadcasting for J-Wave's Spark Radio program with frequent guests and discussion.

2018 marked a year when the group began collaborating more with Western musicians. They released two songs with the French band Moodoïd, "Langage" which appears on Moodoïd's Cité Champagne album and "Matryoshka" which appeared on the group's 2018 Galapagos EP. Later in the year, they were featured on Scottish band Chvrches's single, "Out Of My Head". In April 2018, the group scored the soundtrack for the film Neko wa Daku Mono (猫は抱くもの), which Kenmochi largely produced instrumentals with a few songs featuring KOM_I on vocals.

In April 2019, the Yakushima Treasure EP was released. The material was a radical departure for listener's used to the usual production and sound from previous releases. Previous collaborator Oourtaichi produced the entire album and Kenmochi did not have a hand in it. The sound was much more influenced by traditional Japanese music and soundscapes. A promotional mini-documentary was available via YouTube Premium to launch the album and give context to it. Touring was minimal for the EP but featured KOM_I and Oorutaichi in costume, with KOM_I performing vocals and Oorutaichi digitally manipulating them on the fly. The tour also featured very few previous songs from the group except for "Utah" off the Triathalon EP, "The Sand Castle" off the Galapagos EP, and "A Cat Called Yellow" from the Neko wa Daku Mono soundtrack. During this time, Kenmochi resumed work on his solo career after a long hiatus by releasing 沸騰 沸く ~Footwork〜, an album focused on original juke and footwork music. As the group's activity slowed, Kenmochi continued sound production for other artists, commercials, and releasing a follow-up EP in June 2020 entitled たぶん沸く〜TOWN WORK〜.

In September 2021, it was announced that KOM_I would leave the group, while Dir.F recruited new vocalist Utaha to start a second chapter of the group. KOM_I departed as she wanted to pursue different interests more in line with the sound from Yakushima Treasure, and wanted to allow Wednesday Campanella to return to Kenmochi and Dir.F's vision. She continues to perform solo and plans to continue recording under the name Yakushima Treasure with Oorutaichi.

In October 2021, Utaha made her debut by performing at the Shibuya PARCO and the release of the songs "Alice" and "Buckingham". The group has resumed touring around Japan and in February 2022, they released two more songs and videos for "Maneki Neko" and "Edison".

== Members ==
- Kenmochi Hidefumi (釼持英郁 or ケンモチヒデフミ) - music, lyrics - born August 2, 1981, in Shinagawa.
- Utaha (詩羽) - performer and singer, born on August 9, 2001, in Tokyo
- Dir.F.(ディレクター・エフ, Yasuhiro Fukunaga) - director, utility man

=== Former members ===
- KOM_I (コムアイ, Komuai, Misaki Koshi) - performer, singer - born July 22, 1992, in Kanagawa.

== Name ==
The name Suiyōbi no Campanella is in reference to their usual rehearsal meeting day of Suiyōbi (Wednesday). For their international debut at the SXSW festival in Austin, they adopted the English moniker online, "Wednesday Campanella", which they continued to use in San Francisco for their 2016 J-Pop Summit show and in 2017, at Le Magnifique Society Festival show in Reims, France. KOM_I's name is taken from a shortening of her first and last name.

== Live performances ==
KOM_I appears alone on stage, at events and at promotional occasions. She took karaoke-style live. The live performances are known for KOM_I's high energy performances which makes extensive use of the audience, props, and the entire venue space. She often goes into the crowd, climbs ladders and platforms, and crowdsurfs in a zorb ball for the song "Momotarō". The zorb is meant to represent the peach in which Momotarō was found in according to the Japanese folklore.

During the large performance at the Nippon Budokan in March 2017, both Kenmochi and Dir.F joined KOM_I for a final encore to sing "Dracula".

== Music ==
Kenmochi is mainly in charge of music production, composing, arranging, and songwriting. The names of songs are ones of famous people such as Napoleon, Ryoma Sakamoto and the Wright Brothers. 2017's SUPERMAN expounded on this concept with the idea of larger-than-life people such as Genghis Khan, Aladdin, Kamehameha, and more. In addition, each song refers to historical events, great people, or moments in popular culture. Furthermore, Kenmochi's lyrics seem to sound meaningless, but the soundtrack maker intentionally writes the lyrics in that way. Many songs feature puns or play on words confusing to non-Japanese speakers. KOM_I said that she wants her listeners to enjoy her comical lyrics without thinking of "meaning" of the lyrics.

Previously KOM_I only acted as the group's vocalist, but she began to participate in the production process with Rashomon. KOM_I began to write lyrics for the 2016 release, UMA. However, Kenmochi returned to writing all lyrics and arrangements for 2017's SUPERMAN.

== Discography ==
- Zipangu (2015)
- Superman (2017)
