= Bearbrick =

Japanese collectible toy

- Bearbrick logo
- Type: Collectible art toy
- Inception: 2001
- Manufacturer: MediCom Toy Incorporated
- Website: http://www.bearbrick.com

Bearbrick (rendered BE@RBRICK) is a brand of collectible designer toys designed and produced by the Japanese company MediCom Toy Incorporated. The name is derived from the fact that the figure is a cartoon-style representation of a bear and that it is a variation of MediCom's Kubrick design. The at sign in the place of the letter a is a visual device that is a part of the Bearbrick brand, and as such, a trademark of MediCom Toy.

The figure is an anthropomorphized bear with an extremely simplified form and a pot belly. Each plastic figure features nine parts (widely referred to as tools in the toy industry): head, torso, hips, arms, hands, and legs; These nine tools allow eight points of articulation: swivel head, swivel waist, ball joint arms, swivel wrists, and ball joint legs.

== Releases ==
The first figure was released 27 May 2001 as a free gift to visitors of the World Character Convention 12 in Tokyo. Since then Bearbricks have been released in several different sizes using a variety of materials, including wood, felt, and glow-in-the-dark plastic.

The standard size is seven centimeters high, and these figures are referred to as 100% Bearbricks. Other Bearbricks are named for their size relative to the standard: 50% are four centimeters high, 70% are five centimeters high, 400% are 28 centimeters high, and 1000% are 70 centimeters high. A 200% size chogokin Bearbrick has also been produced standing 14 centimeters tall. A 150% size "Bearbrick Light" has also been produced in 2012, standing 10.5 centimeters tall with a key chain on its head.

For the 100% size, they have four different styles; the SEVEN ANS 200000000 parts which can all be separated; an 'unbreakable' 100%, launched from Series 14 in 2007; a new kind of 'BB bearbrick', launched for kids in 2008, on which all the parts cannot be separated, but the look is a bit different with four screws on the back of the bearbrick.

Bearbricks differ from their predecessor Kubricks, in that each series includes 18 figures in different themes, which are constant from series to series:

- Basic, a solid-color figure with a letter in a second color on its chest; when all nine figures are placed in a row, they spell the word Bearbrick.
- Jellybean, a solid-color figure molded in translucent plastic.
- Pattern, a figure with a patterned deco that may range from polka dots to patterns designed by artist and designer Charles Eames.
- Flag, a figure painted as a nation's flag.
- Horror, a figure with a theme based upon a well-known horror film, or other source in the horror genre.
- SF (an abbreviation of science fiction), a figure with a theme based upon a science fiction source, often a film.
- Cute, a figure which visually represents the concept of cuteness.
- Animal, a figure which depicts an actual animal.
- Artist: two figures, each designed by a visual artist.
- Hero: this category was introduced in series 21, and consists of superheroes from DC Comics.

Bearbricks are most often sold individually in "blind box" assortments, in which figures are packed in small boxes, and the only way to know which particular figure is inside a particular box is to purchase and open the box. The box states the frequency of each figure in percentages: Basic, 14.58 percent; Jellybean, 11.45 percent; Pattern, 11.45 percent; Flag 9.37 percent; Horror, 9.37 percent; SF, 10.41 percent; Cute, 13.54 percent; Animal, 8.33 percent; Hero, 7.29 percent; first Artist, 4.16 percent; and second Artist, 1.04 percent. While many retailers sell Bearbricks in blind boxes, each for the same price, other retailers calculate the frequency of the figures, and sell them at prices that vary accordingly; in this instance, the Basic figure would be the least expensive, as it occurs most often in a case, and the second of the two Artist figures would be the most expensive, as it occurs least often in a case. The figures most valued by collectors are "chase" figures, which are unannounced and not shown in advertisements or on the box alongside other figures in the series.

== Collaborations ==
Many contemporary artists and designers from Asia, Australia, Europe, and North America have designed figures. Designing a Bearbrick figure means creating a design scheme, or deco, for the standard mold. Contributors range from visual artists such as H. R. Giger to illustrators such as Pushead, graffiti artists such as Stash, and fashion designers including Karl Lagerfeld, Vivienne Westwood and Ivana Helsinki. As a result of their limited production, and the participation of artists, Bearbricks are generally considered designer toys.

MediCom also produces Bearbricks outside the regular release schedule of the basic figures. For example, a Kill Bill Bearbrick was created in 2003 as a promotional piece for customers who purchased pre-sale tickets to see the film Kill Bill Volume 2 in Japan. Another Kill Bill Bearbrick, called Murder Bride, was included in the packaging for the Japanese DVD release of Kill Bill Volume 1, released in April 2004. Exclusive pieces such as these are highly sought after and difficult to obtain for collectors outside Japan; they are often purchased on the secondary market, especially online auctions.

Casio has also released a 400% Bearbrick collaboration with the accompany watch, the DW-6900MT-7JR, in conjunction with the G-Shock's 30th Anniversary.

Sports apparel and footwear company Nike, Inc., has also collaborated with Bearbrick to create multiple colorways for the Nike Lunar Force 1, Nike Air Force 1, and Nike SB Dunk.

Sustainable fashion brand PANGAIA, have collaborated with Bearbrick on a collection of hoodies, track pants, T-shirts and bags.

Igloo Inc. IP Pudgy Penguins released a 100% and 400% Pengu themed Be@rbrick

It was revealed that Japanese company Dentsu collaborated with American animation studio DreamWorks Animation to develop a Bearbrick television series for Apple TV+. It was released on March 21, 2025.

== See also ==
- Kubrick
- Designer toys
