= Sket (disambiguation) =

Sket is a British film. Sket may also refer to:

== People ==
- Sket One (born 1970), American artist
- Alen Šket (born 1988), Slovenian volleyball player
- Boris Sket (1936– 2023), Slovenian zoologist

== Other uses ==
- Sket Dance, manga series
- Keisha the Sket, novel
