= Treeson =

Fictional character created by Hong Kong illustrator, Bubi Au Yeung

Treeson and Baby Treeson

Treeson is a fictional character created by Hong Kong illustrator, Bubi Au Yeung. A web comic, vinyl toy, and book have been made about Treeson.

== Story ==
Treeson's birthday is on August 8, 2005. He is a kind creature who was brought up by the trees of a forest. Discovered by a boy named Ren, the two face their past through their friendship and adventures.

Stories about Treeson are available in two languages: Mandarin Chinese and English. The writing language is extremely simple and children-oriented. Most of the pages are only accompanied with one line of text. There are currently five different stories about Treeson: Main story (Treeson & Ren), Broken heart story, Firefly story, Urban story, and Before and After. The stories can be read online.

=== Treeson's friends ===
- Ren: Ren is a very small person, and his best friend is a small cart, which help him haul all his stuff. He always carries a backpack when he goes out.
- Newspaper Boy: Newspaper Boy like to roll up newspapers into the shape of a baguette and deliver them to all the families in the area like a fresh breakfast.
- Circle Boy: Circle boy loves drawing circles and dots. He believes the world is like a concentric circle, where everything is the extension of a dot.
- PinB: PinB is a needle cushion who wants to be a chef.

== Toys ==
The designer toys are produced by Crazy Label in vinyls. Special editions and blind boxed toys of Treeson and friends are also available.

== Awards ==
- Top 10 Designer Toys of 2006 by Format
- Toysrevil’s top 6 vinyl toys of 2006
- Plastic and Plush: 2006 Toy Awards: Toy of the Year
