= Michael Lau =

Hong Kong artist (born 1970)

- Born: March 30, 1970 (age 56); Hong Kong
- Education: Design First Institute of Art, Hong Kong
- Known for: Designer Toy Figure, Art Toy, Painting & Sculpture
- Notable work: Gardener series (1998-present), "Crazychildren" series (2000), "S.F.C.C." series (2003), "Mr. Shoe" series (2005), "Remember-Disc, Time-Table" series (2014), "what? we: want!" series (2016), "Oh My Toy!" series (2018), "Package-Change" series (2018), "Character" series (2019)
- Style: Designer toys, Art toy, Contemporary art

Michael Lau (born 1970) is an artist from Hong Kong who is known for his painting, sculpture and designer toy figures. Lau is widely credited as the founder of the urban vinyl style within the designer toy movement. His work has had a significant effect on toy manufacturers, as well as street culture, including artists and musicians, throughout the world. His style is particularly influential to Asian and American hip-hop and skateboarding culture. Lau has won several awards for his work, including four from the Hong Kong–based Philippe Charriol Foundation.

== Career ==
Known as the “Godfather of the Designer Toys”, Michael Lau Kin-man 劉建文 (b.1970) is an acclaimed Hong Kong artist born in the 1970s when the city was at the peak of industrialization and exported various kinds of toys to leading chain stores around the world. Every toy was a rare treasure to young Michael and played a key role in his childhood. His growing passion for toys eventually led him to a career in toy design where he conceived as a form of art.

After graduating from the First Institute of Art and Design in Hong Kong in 1992, Michael held his first solo painting exhibition at the Pao Galleries of the Hong Kong Arts Centre in the following year. In 1999, Lau merged his creativity and passion in art, toy and action figure and created the “Gardener” series that juxtaposed his favorite G.I. Joe action figures and street culture. A total of 99 12-inch action figures was featured in his solo exhibition held at the Hong Kong Arts Centre. His unique artistic expression in action figures and remarkable achievements garnered global attention and brought him the opportunity to showcase his works in different cities in Japan, the Museum of Contemporary Art in Taipei, London and Paris, leading the global trend of collectible designer toys as an independent artist.

Additionally, Michael Lau has been seen as the godfather of urban vinyl, being largely recognized as the pioneer who launched the trend in the 90s. He was prominently featured in the article “20 Trends Sweeping the Globe” by Forbes Magazine in the January 2008 issue.

In recent years, Michael Lau has returned to his roots in painting. In 2016, his painting Wall of Jordan was presented by Christie's and was auctioned off for charity for a total sum of HKD$1,375,000. Michael's practice focuses not on one particular media but rather, utilizes diverse styles and techniques that he has experimented with over the years.

At Lau's exhibition titled 'Collect them All!' at Christie's Hong Kong in 2018, with over 20 years in the creative field and as someone named as Godfather of the Designer and Art toy movement, Michael Lau has declared "All art are toys, all toys are art." As Michael believes that a meaningful collection should not be assessed based on its monetary value, but should more importantly evoke feelings of nostalgia and sentiment. A prized collection allows one to delve into memories of the past, provides consolation in times of emptiness, and enriches and elevates the spirit. Michael believes that in the eyes of the collector objects – whether they be paintings, jewelry, watches, sneakers, or furniture – have an ability to provide emotional value, in the same way that toys can provoke wonder and curiosity. Lau's further his exploration on the notion with his second 'Collect them All!' exhibition at Christie's Shanghai in 2019 following the success from the Hong Kong show.
