= Outhouse =

Outdoor structure containing a toilet

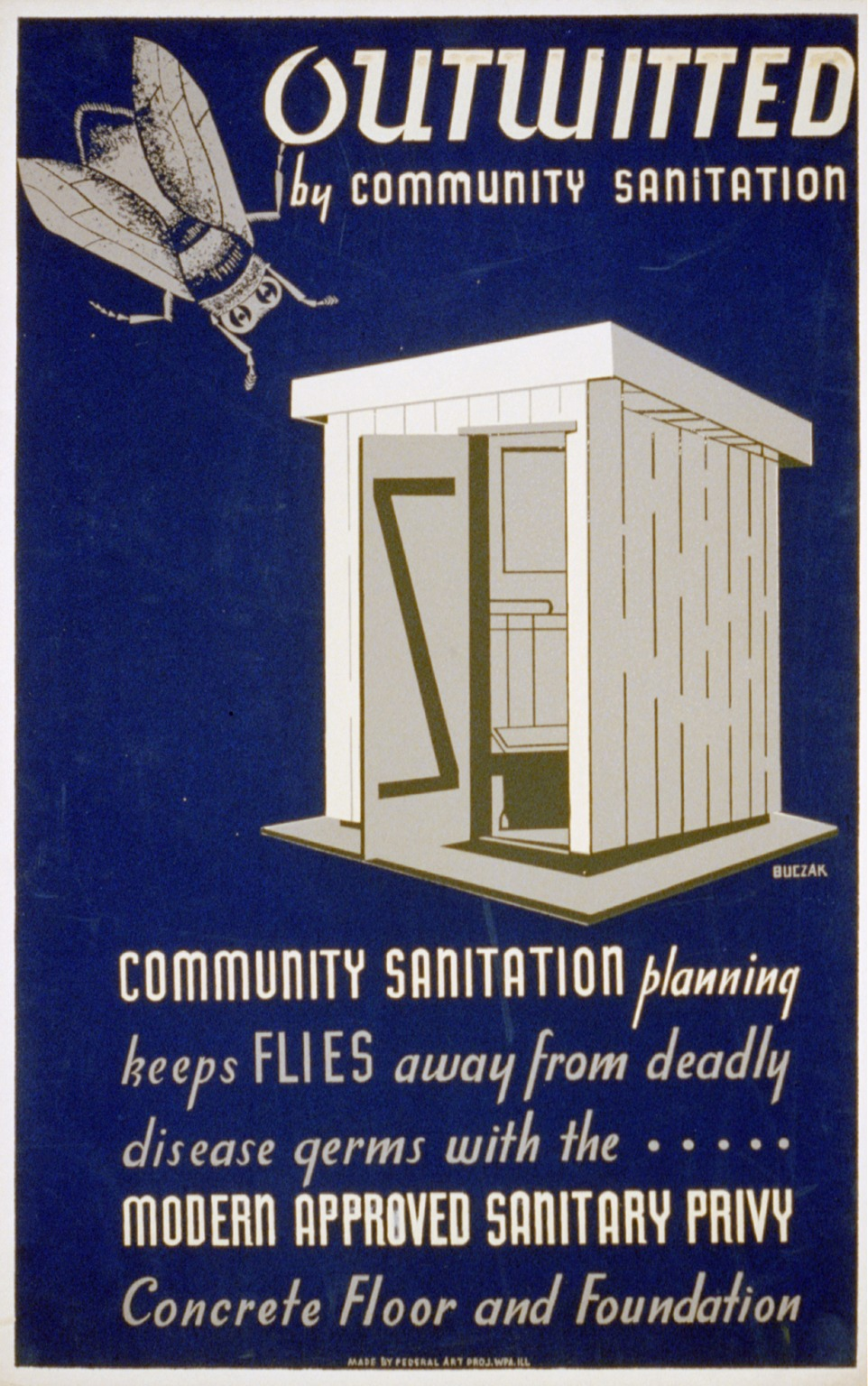
Historical community sanitation poster promoting sanitary outhouse designs (Illinois, US, 1940)

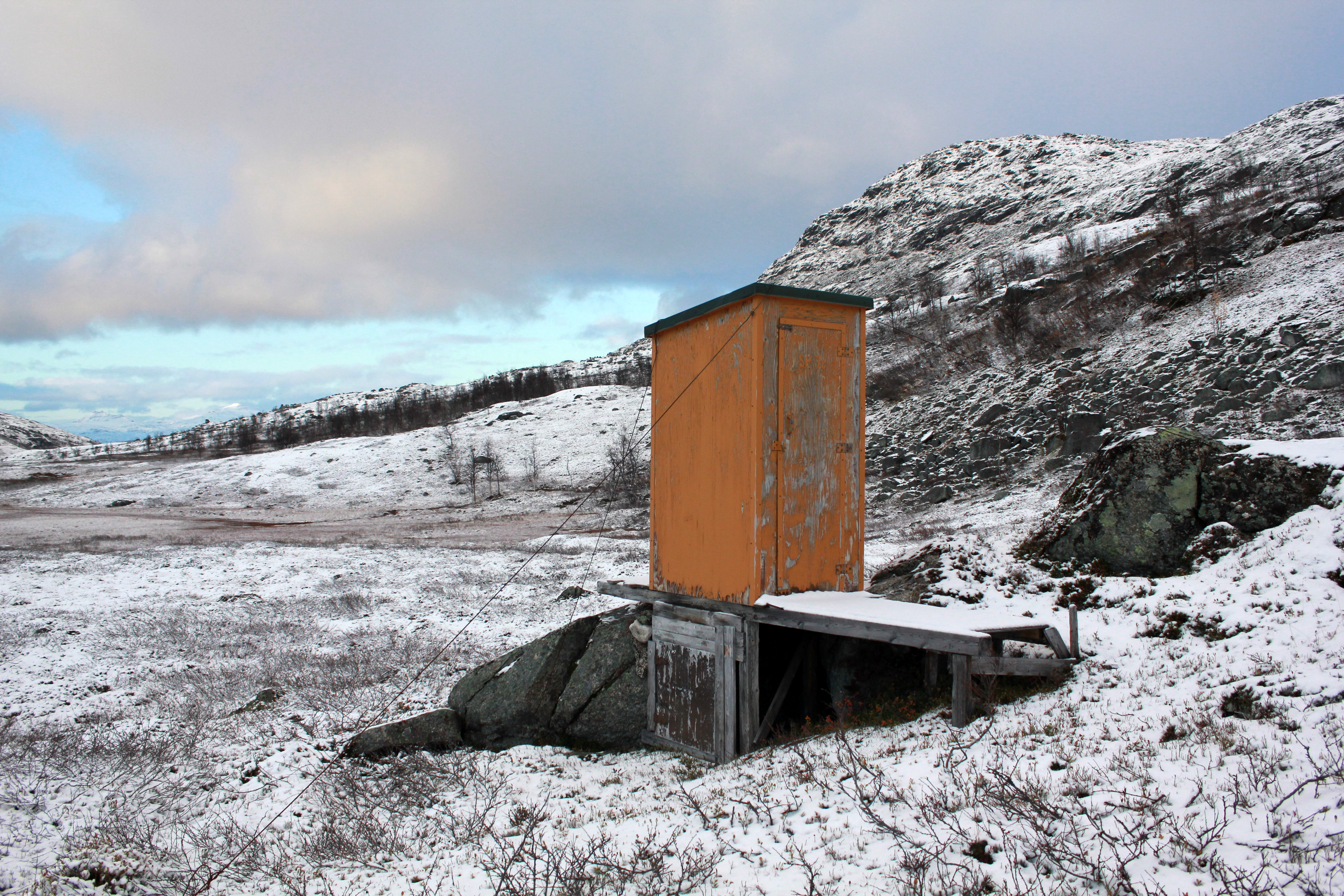
Outhouse in the mountains in northern Norway

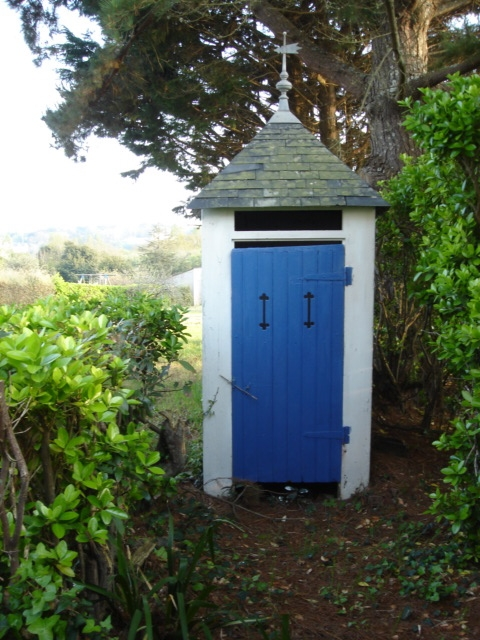
An outhouse in Le Palais, Brittany

An outhouse — known variously across the English-speaking world otherwise as bog, dunny, long-drop, or privy — is a small structure, separate from a house or main building, which covers a toilet. This is typically either a pit latrine or a bucket toilet, but other forms of dry (non-flushing) toilets may be encountered. The term may also be used to denote the toilet itself, not just the structure.

Outhouses were in use in cities of developed countries (e.g. Australia) well into the second half of the twentieth century. They are still common in rural areas and also in cities of developing countries. Outhouses that are covering pit latrines in densely populated areas can cause groundwater pollution.

== Design aspects ==
=== Common features ===
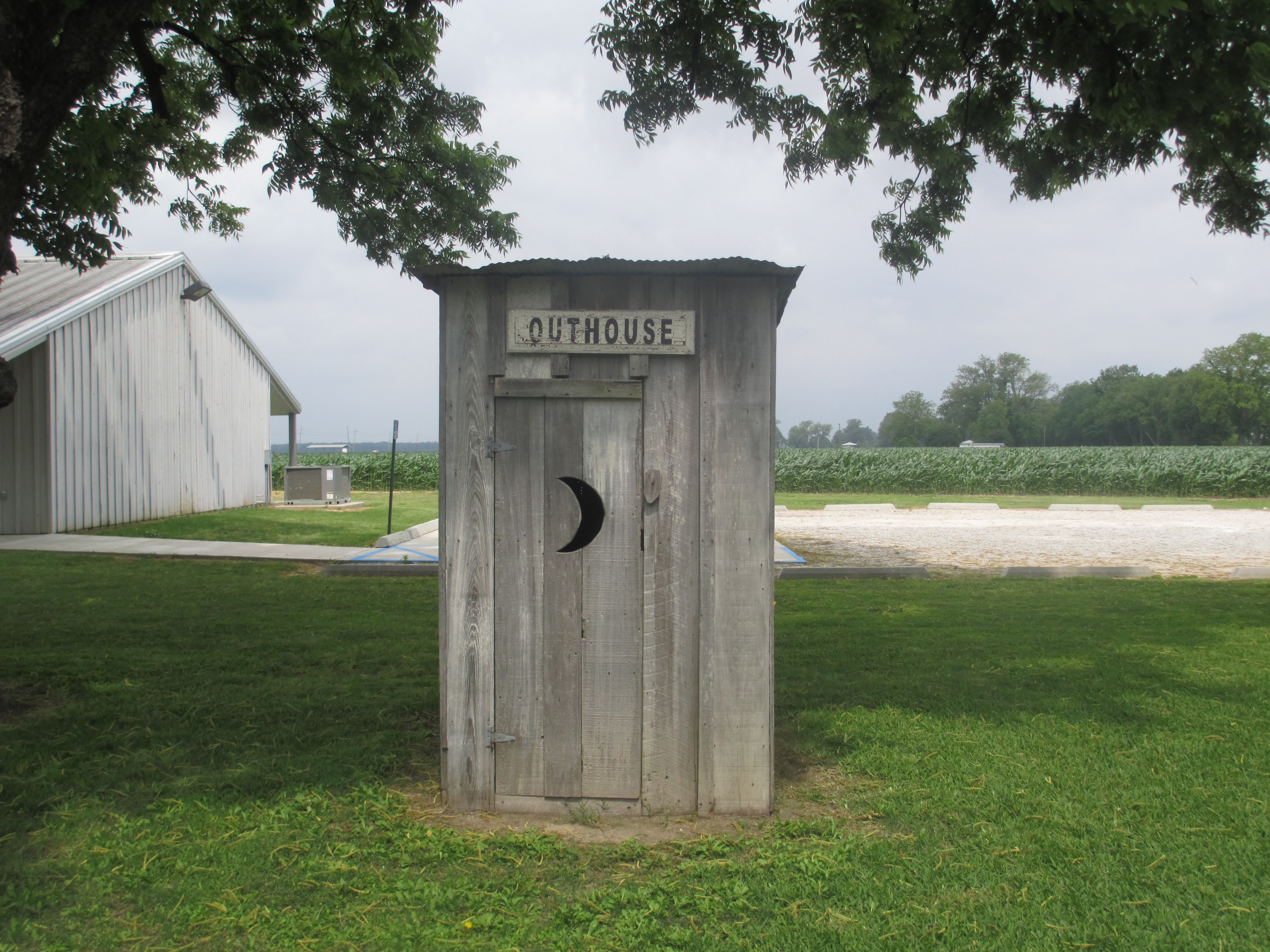
Outhouse used by sharecroppers on display, Louisiana State Cotton Museum, Lake Providence

Outhouses vary in design and construction. They are by definition outside the dwelling, and are not connected to plumbing, sewer, or septic system. The World Health Organization recommends they be built a reasonable distance from the house balancing issues of easy access versus that of smell.

The superstructure exists to shelter the user, and also to protect the toilet itself. The primary purpose of the building is for privacy and human comfort, and the walls and roof provide a visual screen and some protection from the elements. The outhouse also has the secondary role of protecting the toilet hole from sudden influxes of rainwater, which would flood the hole and flush untreated wastes into the underlying soils before they can decompose.

Outhouses are commonly humble and utilitarian, made of lumber or plywood. This is especially so they can easily be moved when the earthen pit fills up. Depending on the size of the pit and the amount of use, this can be fairly frequent, sometimes yearly. As pundit "Jackpine" Bob Cary wrote: "Anyone can build an outhouse, but not everyone can build a good outhouse." Floor plans typically are rectangular or square, but hexagonal outhouses have been built.

The arrangements inside the outhouse vary by culture. In Western societies, many, though not all, have at least one seat with a hole in it, above a small pit. Others, often in more rural, older areas in European countries, simply have a hole with two indents on either side for the user's feet. In Eastern societies, there is a hole in the floor, over which the user crouches. A roll of toilet paper is usually available. Old corn cob, leaves, or other types of paper may instead be used.

The decoration on the outhouse door has no standard. The well-known crescent moon on American outhouses was popularized by cartoonists and had a questionable basis in fact. There are authors who claim the practice began during the colonial period as an early "mens"/"ladies" designation for an illiterate populace (the sun and moon being popular symbols for the sexes during those times). Others dismiss the claim as an urban legend. (Note: Discussion of outhouses as vernacular architecture (including crescent moon folklore), from the Missouri Folklore Society.) What is certain is that the purpose of the hole is for venting and light and there were a wide variety of shapes and placements employed.

=== Toilet types covered by outhouse shelters ===
The shelter may cover very different sorts of toilets.

==== Pit latrines ====
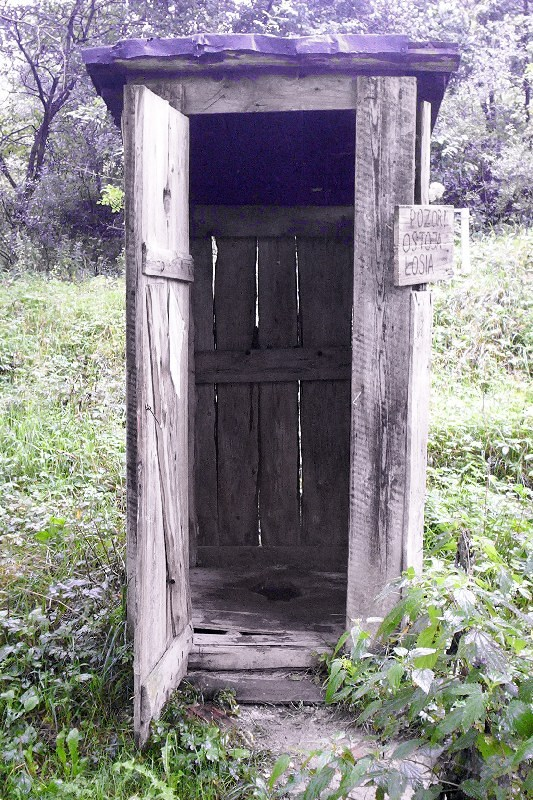
Outhouse with squat toilet inside (Poland)

An outhouse often provides the shelter for a pit latrine, which collects human feces in a hole in the ground. When properly built and maintained they can decrease the spread of disease by reducing the amount of human feces in the environment from open defecation. When the pit fills to the top, it should be either emptied or a new pit constructed and the shelter moved or re-built at the new location. The management of the fecal sludge removed from the pit is complicated. There are both environment and health risks if not done properly. As of 2013 pit latrines are used by an estimated 1.77 billion people. This is mostly in the developing world as well as in rural and wilderness areas.

==== Bucket toilet ====
Another system is the bucket toilet, consisting of a seat and a portable receptacle (bucket or pail). These may be emptied by their owners into composting piles in the garden (a low-tech composting toilet), or collected by contractors for larger-scale disposal. Historically, this was known as the pail closet; the municipality employed workers, often known as "nightmen" (from night soil), to empty and replace the buckets. This system was associated in particular with the English town of Rochdale, to the extent that it was described as the "Rochdale System" of sanitation. 20th century books report that similar systems were in operation in parts of France and elsewhere in continental Europe.

The system of municipal collection was widespread in Australia; "dunny cans" persisted well into the second half of the twentieth century, see below. In Scandinavia and some other countries, outhouses are built over removable containers that enable easy removal of the waste and enable much more rapid composting in separate piles. A similar system operates in India, where hundreds of thousands of workers engage in manual scavenging, i.e. emptying pit latrines and bucket toilets without any personal protective equipment.

==== Drums and barrels in national parks ====
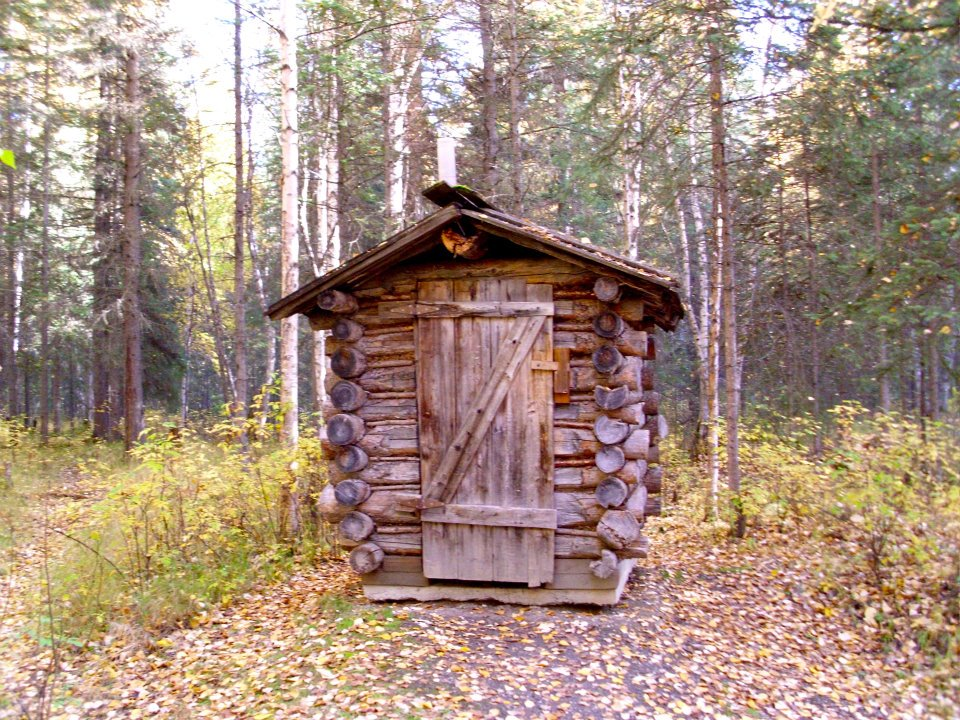
Log outhouse at a public-use cabin, Chena River State Recreation Area, Alaska

A variety of systems are used in some national parks and popular wilderness areas, to cope with the increased volume of people engaged in activities such as mountaineering and kayaking. The growing popularity of paddling, hiking, and climbing has created special waste disposal issues throughout the world. It is a dominant topic for outdoor organizations and their members. For example, in some places the human waste is collected in drums which need to be helicoptered in and out at considerable expense.

Alternatively, some parks mandate a "pack it in, pack it out" rule. Many reports document the use of containers for the removal of excrement, which must be packed in and packed out on Mount Everest. Also known as "expedition barrels" or "bog barrels", the cans are weighed to make sure that groups do not dump them along the way. "Toilet tents" are erected. There has been an increasing awareness that the mountain needs to be kept clean, for the health of the climbers at least.

==== Composting toilets ====
Worm hold privies, another variant of the composting toilet, are being used by Vermont's Green Mountain Club. These simple outhouses are stocked with red worms (a staple used by home composters). Composting toilets are also subject to regulations.

The "Clivus Multrum" is another type of composting toilet which can be inside of an outhouse.

==== Others ====
There are other types of toilet that may be covered by an outhouse superstructure, or a toilet tent (e.g. in humanitarian relief operations), or even be installed inside a house that is beyond the reach of sewers. The Swedish Pacto toilet uses a continuous roll of plastic to collect and dispose of waste. Incinerating toilets are installed in several thousand cabins in Norway. These toilets incinerate waste into ashes, using only propane and 12 volt battery electricity.

== Public health issues ==
Outhouse design, placement, and maintenance has long been recognized as being important to the public health. See posters created by the Works Progress Administration during the 1930s and early 1940s.

=== Insect control ===
Some types of flying insects such as the housefly are attracted to the odor of decaying material, and will use it for food for their offspring, laying eggs in the decaying material. Other insects such as mosquitoes seek out standing water that may be present in the pit for the breeding of their offspring.

Both of these are undesirable pests to humans, but can be easily controlled without chemicals by enclosing the top of the pit with tight-fitting boards or concrete, using a sufficiently sealed toilet hole cover that is closed after every use, and by using fine-grid insect screen to cover the inlet and outlet vent holes. This prevents flying insect entry by all potential routes.

It is common (at least in the United States) for outhouses to have a bucket or a bag of powdered lime with a scoop of some kind in it. Either before or after using the outhouse (usually after but sometimes both) a scoop or two of lime is sprinkled into the lid holes to cover the waste as to suppress the odor which also can help with the insect issues. This method of using powdered lime is also used (and for the same reasons) in common/mass graves.

=== Parasites ===
One of the purposes of outhouses is to avoid spreading parasites such as intestinal worms, notably hookworms, which might otherwise be spread via open defecation.

== Uses ==
=== Outhouses on mountain peaks ===
- On August 29, 2007, the highest outhouse (actually not a building but a pit toilet surrounded by a low rock wall) in the continental United States, which sat atop Mount Whitney at about 14,494 feet (4,418 m) above sea level, offering a magnificent panorama to the user, was removed. Two other outhouses in the Inyo National Forest were closed due to the expense and danger involved in transporting out large sewage drums via helicopter. The annual 19,000 or so hikers of the Mount Whitney Trail, who must pick up National Forest Service permits, are now given Wagbags (a double-sealed sanitation kit) to facilitate the practice of "pack it in; pack it out." Solar-powered toilets did not sufficiently compact the excrement, and the systems were judged failures at that location. Additionally, relieving park rangers of latrine duty allowed them to better concentrate on primary ranger duties such as talking to hikers. The use of Wagbags and the removal of outhouses is part of a larger trend in US parks. The US National Park Service once built an outhouse that cost above $333,000.
- In 2007, France's two highest outhouses were helicoptered to the top of Mont Blanc at a height of 4,260 metres (13,980 ft). The containers from these outhouses are emptied by helicopter. The facilities will serve 30,000 skiers and hikers annually, helping to alleviate the deposit of urine and feces that spread down the mountain face with the spring thaw, and turned it into 'Mont Noir'. More technically, the 2002 book Le versant noir du mont Blanc ("The black hillside of Mont Blanc") exposes problems in conserving the site.
- Upon the 5,642-metre (18,510 ft) Mount Elbrus—Russia's highest peak, the highest mountain in Europe and topographically dividing Europe from Asia—sits the world's "nastiest outhouse" at 4,206 metres (13,799 ft). It is in the Caucasus Mountains, near the frontier between Georgia and Russia. As one writer opined, "...it does not much feel like Europe when you're there. It feels more like Central Asia or the Middle East." The outhouse is surrounded by and covered in ice, perched off the end of a rock, and with a pipe pouring effluvia onto the mountain. It consistently receives low marks for sanitation and convenience, but is considered a unique experience.
- Australia's highest outhouse – located at Rawson's Pass in the Main Range in Kosciuszko National Park, which annually receives over 100,000 walkers outside of winter and has a serious human waste management issue, was completed in 2008.
- A stone outhouse in Colca Canyon, Peru, has been claimed to be "the world's highest".

== History ==
Old outhouse pits are seen as excellent places for archeological and anthropological excavations, offering up a trove of common objects from the past—a veritable inadvertent time capsule—which yields historical insight into the lives of the bygone occupants. This is also called privy digging. It is especially common to find old bottles, which seemingly were secretly stashed or trashed, so their content could be privately imbibed. Fossilised feces (coprolites) yield much information about diet and health.

=== Australia ===
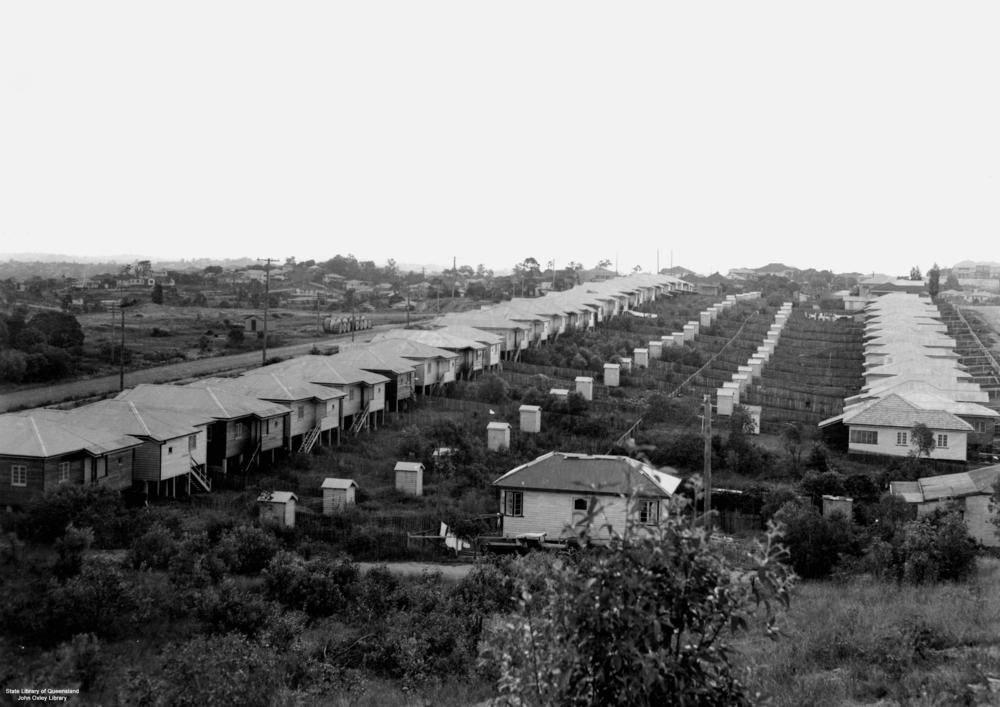
Norman Park, Queensland, around 1950; like many areas of Brisbane this area was unsewered until the late 1960s, with each house having an outhouse or "dunny" in the back yard. The little sheds in each back yard are outhouses.

"Dunny" or "dunny can" are Australian words for a toilet, particularly an outhouse. The combinations "dunny paper" and "dunny brush" are commonly encountered. For other uses of the word, see dunny (disambiguation).

In suburban areas not connected to the sewerage, outhouses were not always built over pits. Instead, these areas used a pail closet, where waste was collected into large cans positioned under the toilet seat, to be collected by contractors (or night soil collectors) hired by property owners or the local council. The used cans were replaced with empty, cleaned cans. Brisbane relied on "dunny carts" until the 1950s; because the population was so dispersed, it was difficult to install sewerage. Tar, creosote, and disinfectant kept the smell down. Academic George Seddon claimed that "the typical Australian back yard in the cities and country towns" had, throughout the first half of the twentieth century, "a dunny against the back fence, so that the pan could be collected from the dunny lane through a trap-door". The person who appeared weekly to empty the buckets beneath the seats was known as the "dunnyman", see gong farmer.

The "dunny lanes" provided access to collectors. These access lanes can now be worth considerable sums. See ransom strip.

The Great Australian Dunny Race has become an icon during the Weerama Festival at Werribee.

=== Denmark ===
The remains of a thousand year old Viking outhouse were discovered in 2017. This is the oldest known outhouse in the country, even though evidence cannot establish it to be "the first". This discovery was considered to be culturally significant. (Note: "Toilets were important enough to the Vikings that there are references to them in Viking literature. Medieval scholar Sarah Künzler, of Trinity College, Dublin, notes that Old Norse has several words for outhouse, including garðhús (yard house), náð-/náða-hús (house of rest), and annat hús (the other house). Künzler writes that these words '[confirm] the notion that a separate house was built as a privy.'")

=== United States ===
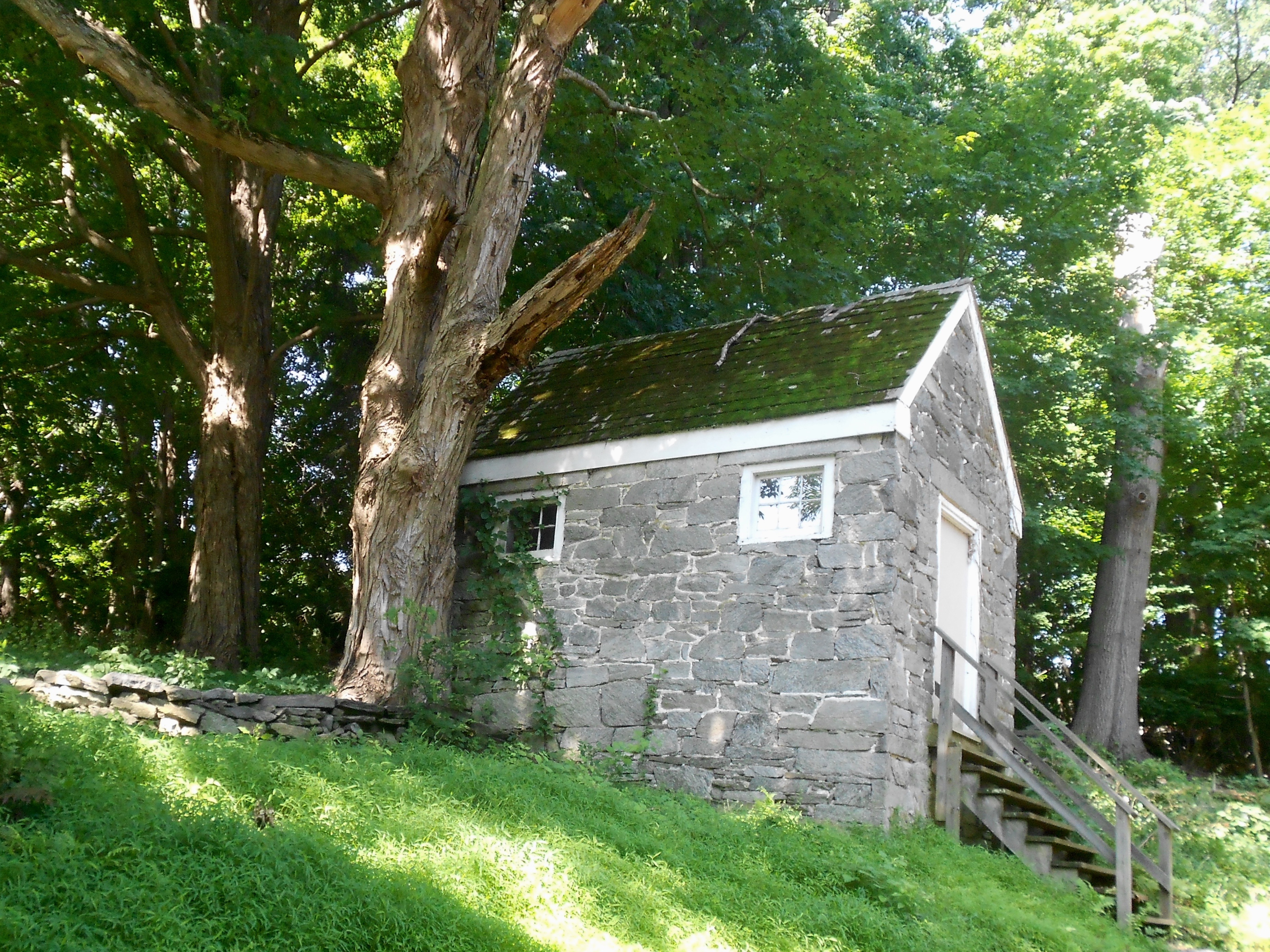
Eight-seat stone outhouse at the Thomas Leiper Estate near Wallingford, Pennsylvania

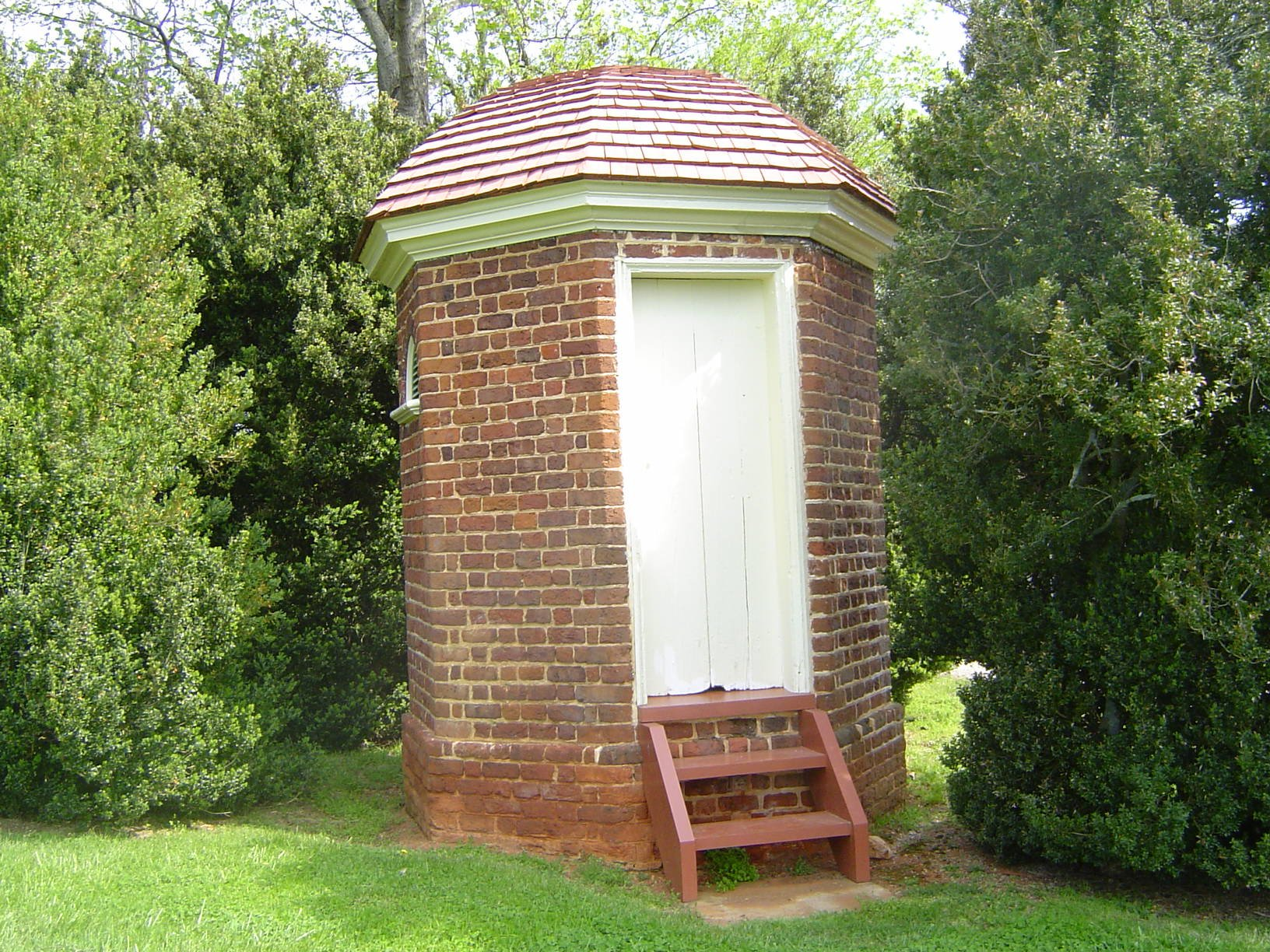
A brick outhouse at Thomas Jefferson's Poplar Forest estate near Lynchburg, Virginia

Outhouses are typically built on one level, but two-story models are found in unusual circumstances. One double-decker was built to serve a two-story building in Cedar Lake, Michigan. The outhouse was connected by walkways. It still stands (but not the building). (Note: Cedar Lake, Michigan.) The waste from "upstairs" is directed down a chute separate from the "downstairs" facility in these instances, so contrary to various jokes about two-story outhouses, the user of the lower level has nothing to fear if the upper level is simultaneously in use. The Boston Exchange Coffee House (1809–1818) was equipped with a four-story outhouse with windows on each floor. The "Howe" house, in Phelps, New York (built in 1869) is an example of a residential home built with a two-story privy, on one side of the house. This house just underwent restoration.

Some outhouses were built surprisingly ornately, considering the time and the place. For example, an opulent 19th century antebellum example (a three-holer) is at the plantation area at the state park in Stone Mountain, Georgia. The outhouses of Colonial Williamsburg varied widely, from simple expendable temporary wood structures to high-style brick. Thomas Jefferson designed and had built two brick octagons at his vacation home. Such outhouses are sometimes considered overbuilt, impractical and ostentatious, giving rise to the simile "built like a brick shithouse." That phrase's meaning and application is subject to some debate; but (depending upon the country) it has been applied to men, women, or inanimate objects.

With regards to anal cleansing, old newspapers and mail order catalogs, such as those from Montgomery Ward or Sears Roebuck, were common before toilet paper was widely available. The Old Farmer's Almanac, manufactured with a hole drilled through it to allow easy hanging on a nail, was popular. Paper was often kept in a can or other container to protect it from mice, etc. The catalogs served a dual purpose, also giving one something to read.

== Society and culture ==
=== Names ===
Outdoor toilets are referred to by many epithets and terms throughout the English-speaking world varying in levels of politeness and discretion of euphemism to the public taste. (Note: For a full list of synonyms, see "bathroom" at Wikisaurus.) The term "outhouse" is used in North American English for the structure over a toilet, usually a pit latrine ("long-drop"). However, in British English "outhouse" means any outbuilding, including such as a shed or barn.

In Australia and parts of Canada an outdoor toilet is known as a "dunny". "Privy", an archaic variant of "private", is used in North America, Scotland, and northern England. "Bog" is common throughout Britain (used to coin the neologism "tree bog") and also used informally in Britain, Canada and Australia to refer to any toilet. The name "little house" (as tŷ bach) continues as a euphemism for any toilet in both the Welsh language and the Welsh English dialect. Other terms include "back house", "house of ease", and "house of office". The last was common in 17th-century England and appeared in Samuel Pepys's Diary on numerous occasions. (Note: As "October 23, 1660: ...going down into my cellar..., I put my foot into a great heap of turds, by which I find Mr Turner's house of office is full and comes into my cellar.")

A regional name for an outhouse in North America used especially in Virginia is "johnnyhouse" or "johnny house". In the Scouting Movement in North America, a widespread term for outhouse is "kybo". This appears to have originated from camps which used Kybo brand coffee cans to hold lye or lime which was sprinkled down the hole to reduce odor. "Keep Your Bowels Open" may be a backronym. Temporary encampments may use a tent or tarpaulin over a shallow pit; one name for this is a "hudo", acronym of "Houd uw darmen open" (Dutch for "Keep Your Bowels Open").

In Poland the wooden outdoor toilets are commonly called "Sławojka", a name that refers to the former Prime Minister Felicjan Sławoj Składkowski who used to monitor scrupulously the implementation of the provisions imposed by the construction law of 1928, making it mandatory for outdoor toilet pits to be surrounded by walls.

=== Mythology ===
Tsi-Ku, also known as Tsi Ku Niang, is described as the Chinese goddess of the outhouse and divination. It is said that a woman could uncover the future by going to the outhouse to ask Tsi-Ku. See toilet god.

=== Regulations ===
==== United States ====
Construction and maintenance of outhouses in the US is subject to state and local governmental restriction, regulation and prohibition. It is potentially both a public health issue, which has been addressed both by law and by education of the public as to good methods and practices (e.g., separation from drinking water sources). This also becomes a more prevalent issue as urban and suburban development encroaches on rural areas, and is an external manifestation of a deeper cultural conflict. See also urban sprawl, urban planning, regional planning, suburbanization, urbanization and counterurbanization.

=== Songs, poems and stories ===
- The double-decker outhouse has been used as an unflattering metaphor for "trickle-down economics" and for power dynamics perceived as unfair. Depending on who is depicted on top and below, it is an easy and familiar cartoon.
- On November 10, 2003, a drawing of an outhouse was used by B.C. cartoonist Johnny Hart as a motif in a controversial and allegedly religiously themed piece. The cartoonist denied the allegations and the convoluted analysis of the alleged iconography of the cartoon.
- In 1929 comedian Charles "Chic" Sale published a small book, The Specialist, which was a large "underground" success. Its entire premise centered on sales of outhouses, touting the advantages of one kind or another, and labeling them in "technical" terms such as "one-holers", "two-holers", etc. Over a million copies were sold. In 1931 his monologue "I'm a Specialist" was made into a hit record (Victor 22859) by recording artist Frank Crumit (music by Nels Bitterman). As memorialized in the "Outhouse Wall of Fame", the term "Chic Sale" became a rural slang synonym for privies, an appropriation of Mr. Sale's name that he personally considered unfortunate.
- Folk singer Billy Edd Wheeler wrote and performed a song titled "The Little Brown Shack Out Back", a sentimental look at the outhouse.
- In Newfoundland, a well-known song entitled "Good Old Newfie Outhouse" sings the praises of using the outhouse when it is −25 degrees out, mentioning pleasures like pants being frozen in position at the knees. A version by singer Bobby Evans is available on an album called Silly Songs on iTunes.
- A humorous and nostalgic poem entitled "Passing of the Backhouse", about the disappearance of outhouses in America. It has been attributed to authors including James Whitcomb Riley, an American poet who denied authorship when he became aware of an attribution in 1910.
- The first chapter of John D. Fitzgerald's autobiographical children's book, The Great Brain, talked of how Utah of the 1890s saw such structures as not only necessary, but as a mark of social status, with the poorest families in town having a two-holed structure to the town mayor owning one with ornate woodwork and heating, and the entire town's befuddlement about the Fitzgeralds being the first family to install a flush toilet in their home. Also, the vernacular of such terms was "backhouse", as the word "outhouse" was used to describe a tool shed or other small building not connected to the main house.

=== Races and pranks ===
- In Michigan, the Upper Peninsula's Trenary has the largest outhouse race, but Mackinaw City is home to an annual and largest "outhouse race south of the Mackinac Bridge". Other famous outhouse races are during the Yale Bologna Festival and in Dawson City, Yukon.
- As a college student, Richard Nixon achieved renown by providing a three-hole outhouse to be tossed onto the traditional campus bonfire.
- Outhouse tipping, i.e., turning over outhouses, allegedly on Halloween. There is a popular quote from Loretta Lynn's memoirs: "We used to go around tipping outhouses over..."

== Gallery ==
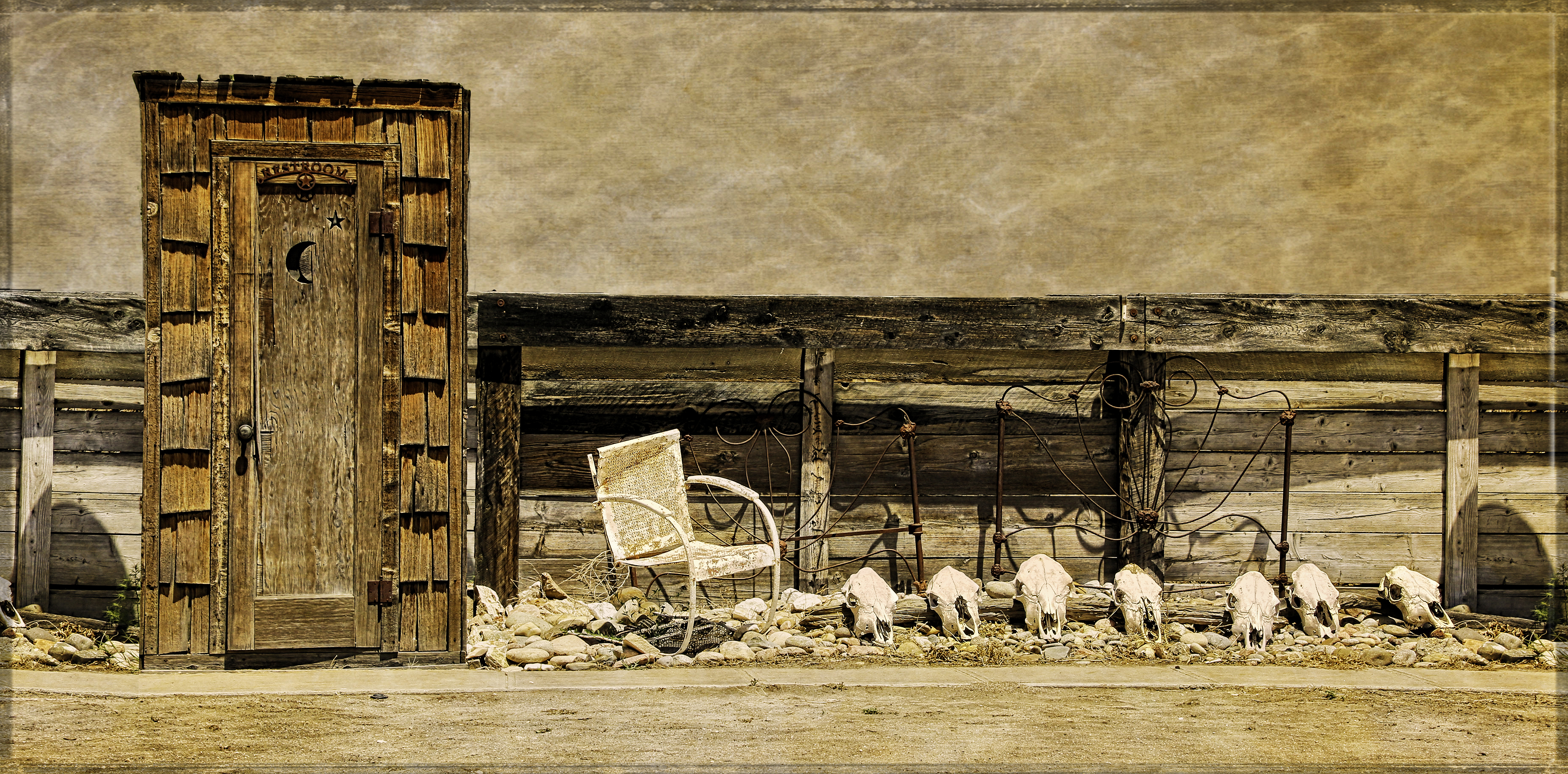
An outhouse display in an Old West setting on a Colorado ranch

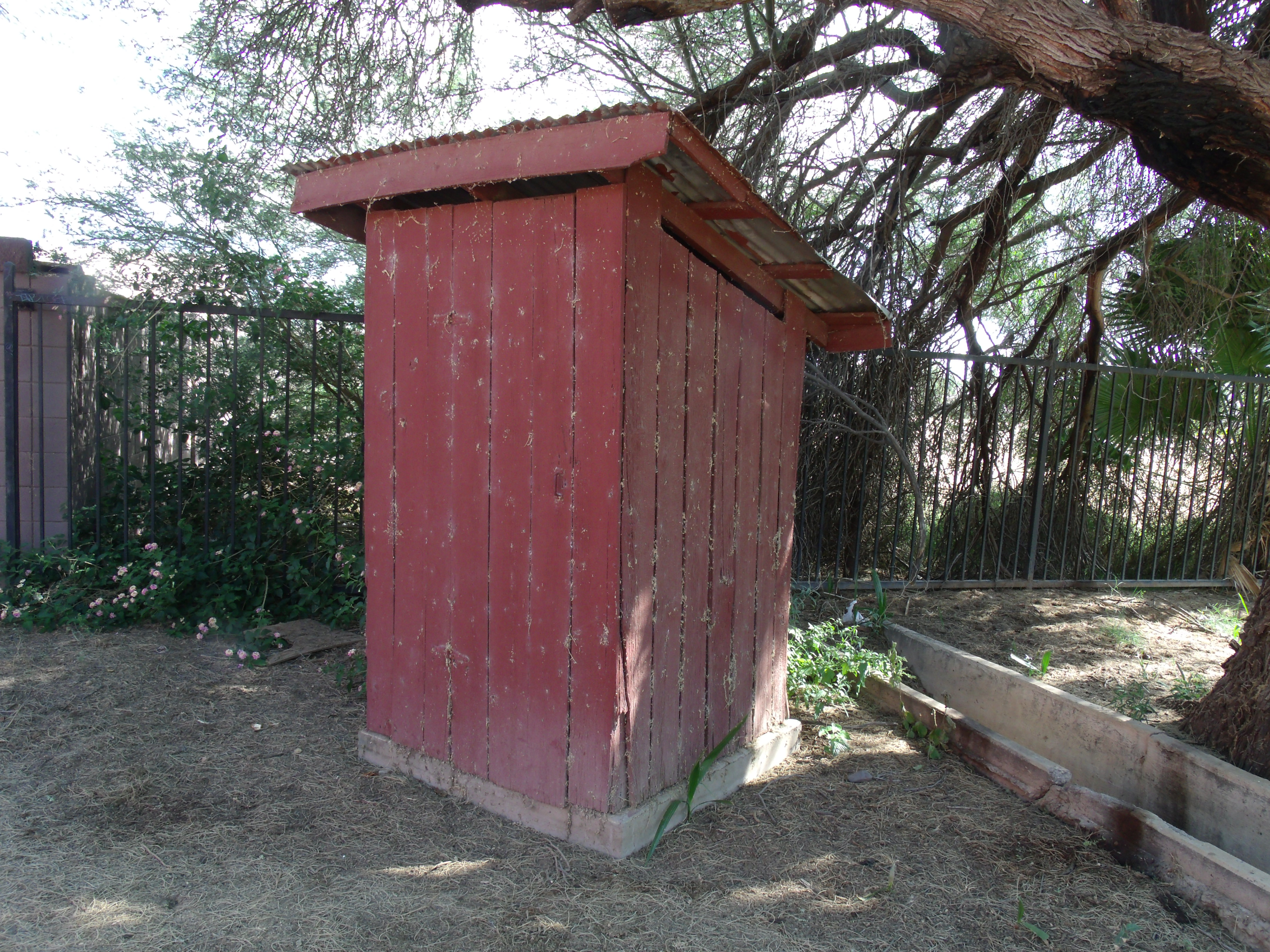
Outhouse used in the 19th century: Manistee Ranch in Glendale, Arizona, US

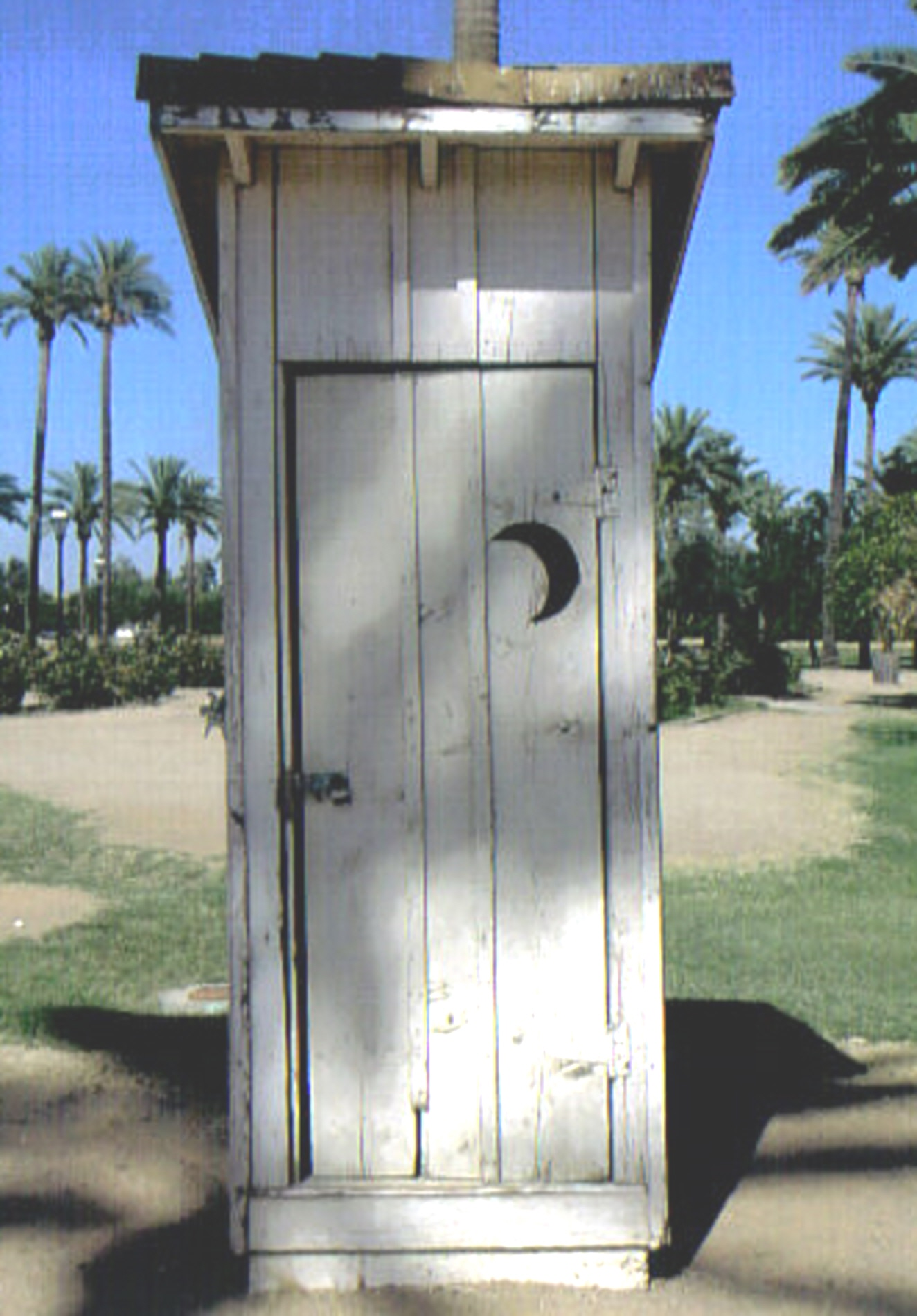
Outhouse used in the 19th century: Sahuaro Ranch in Glendale, Arizona, US

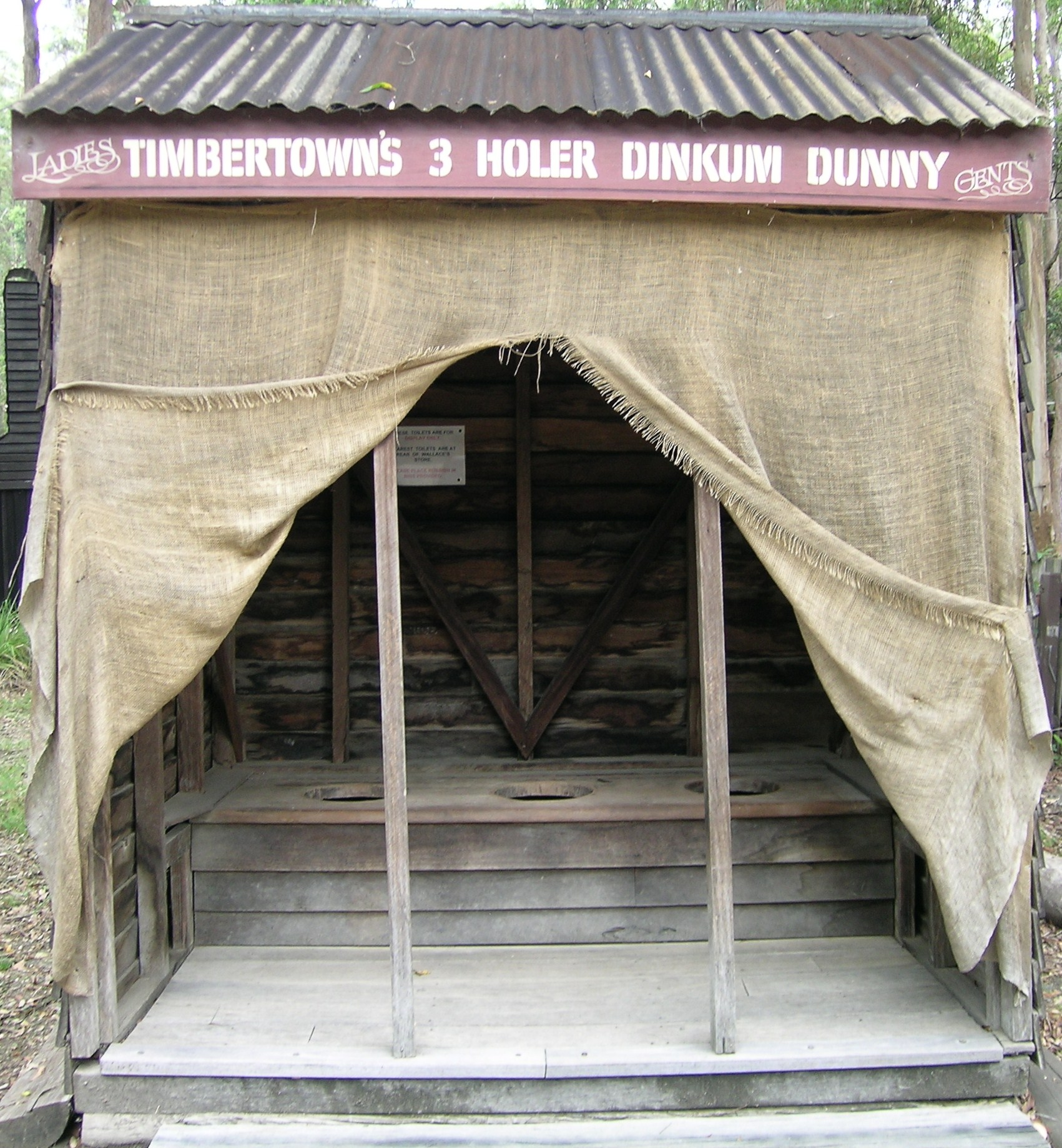
Triple-seated outhouse, Wauchope, New South Wales, Australia

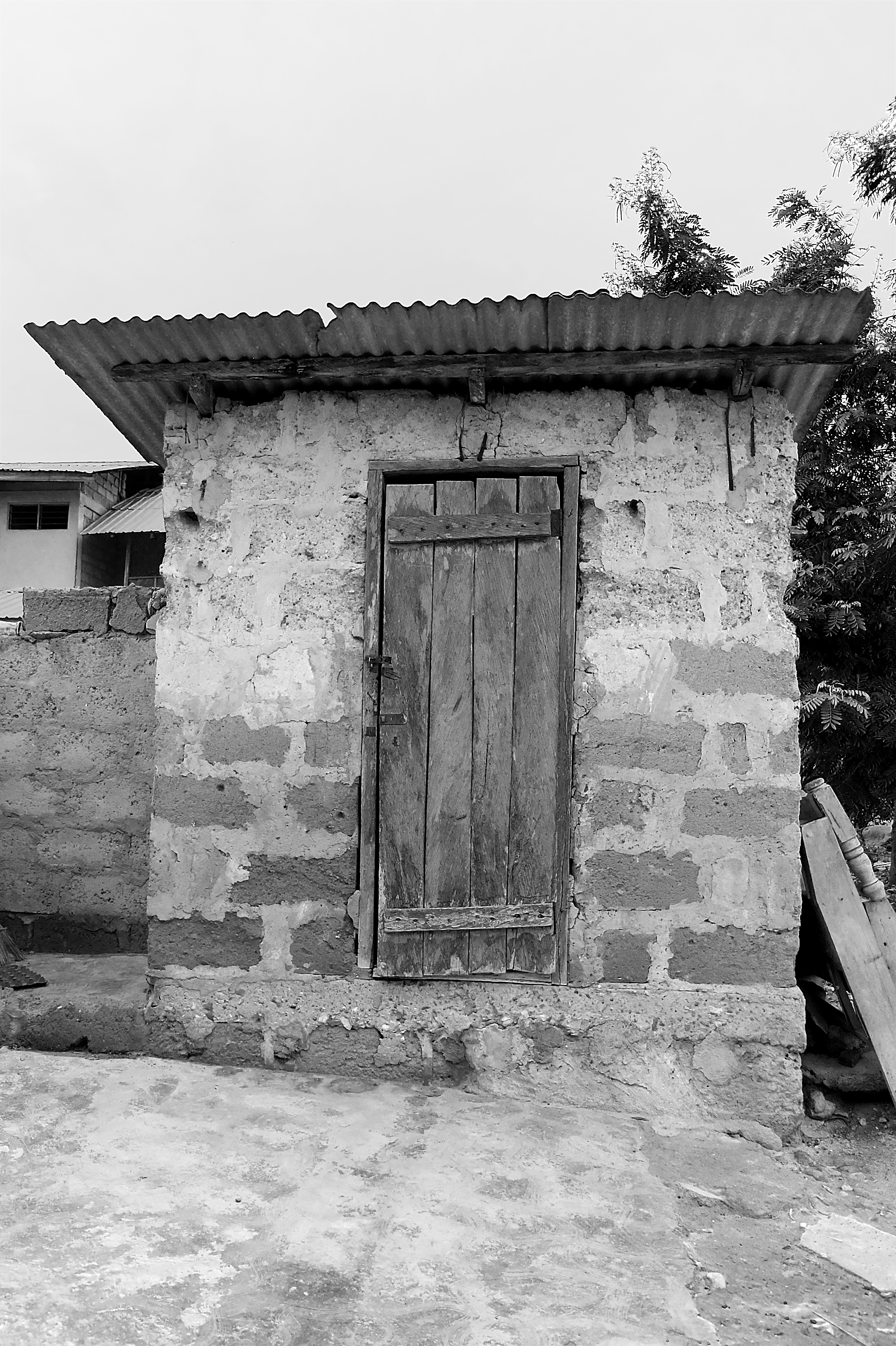
Toilet facility made of cement blocks

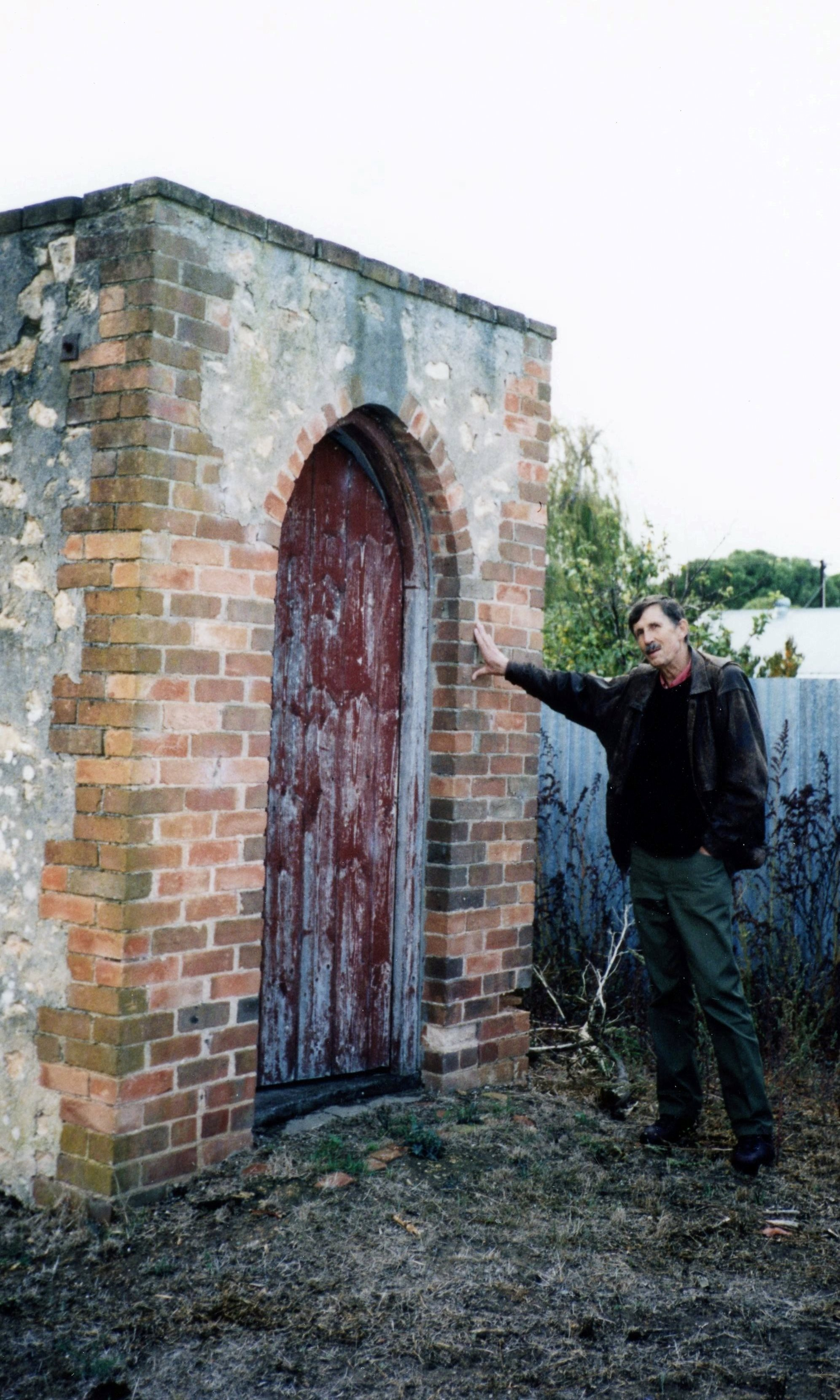
Church dunny, Milang, South Australia

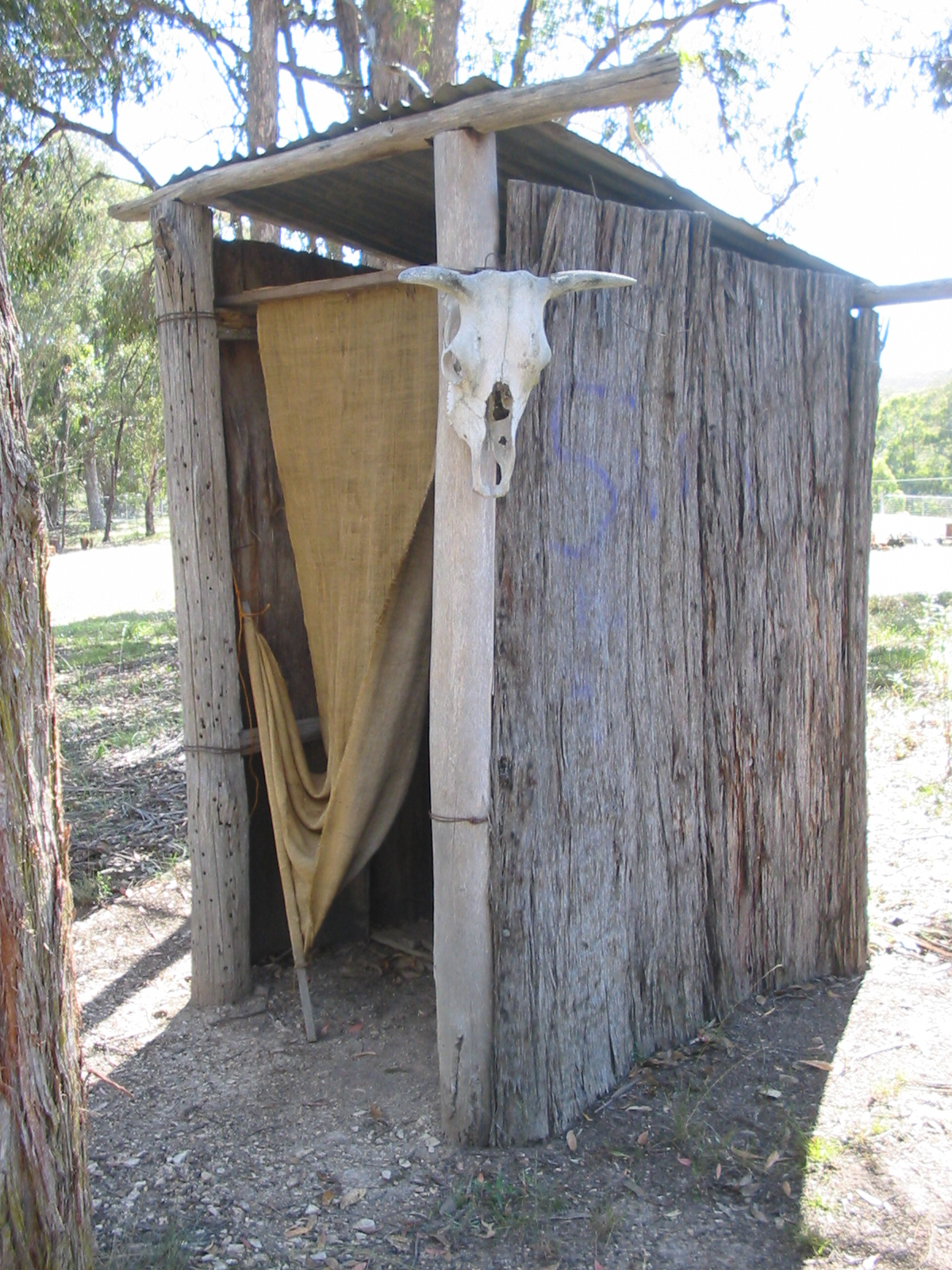
Outhouse at Walcha, New South Wales, Australia

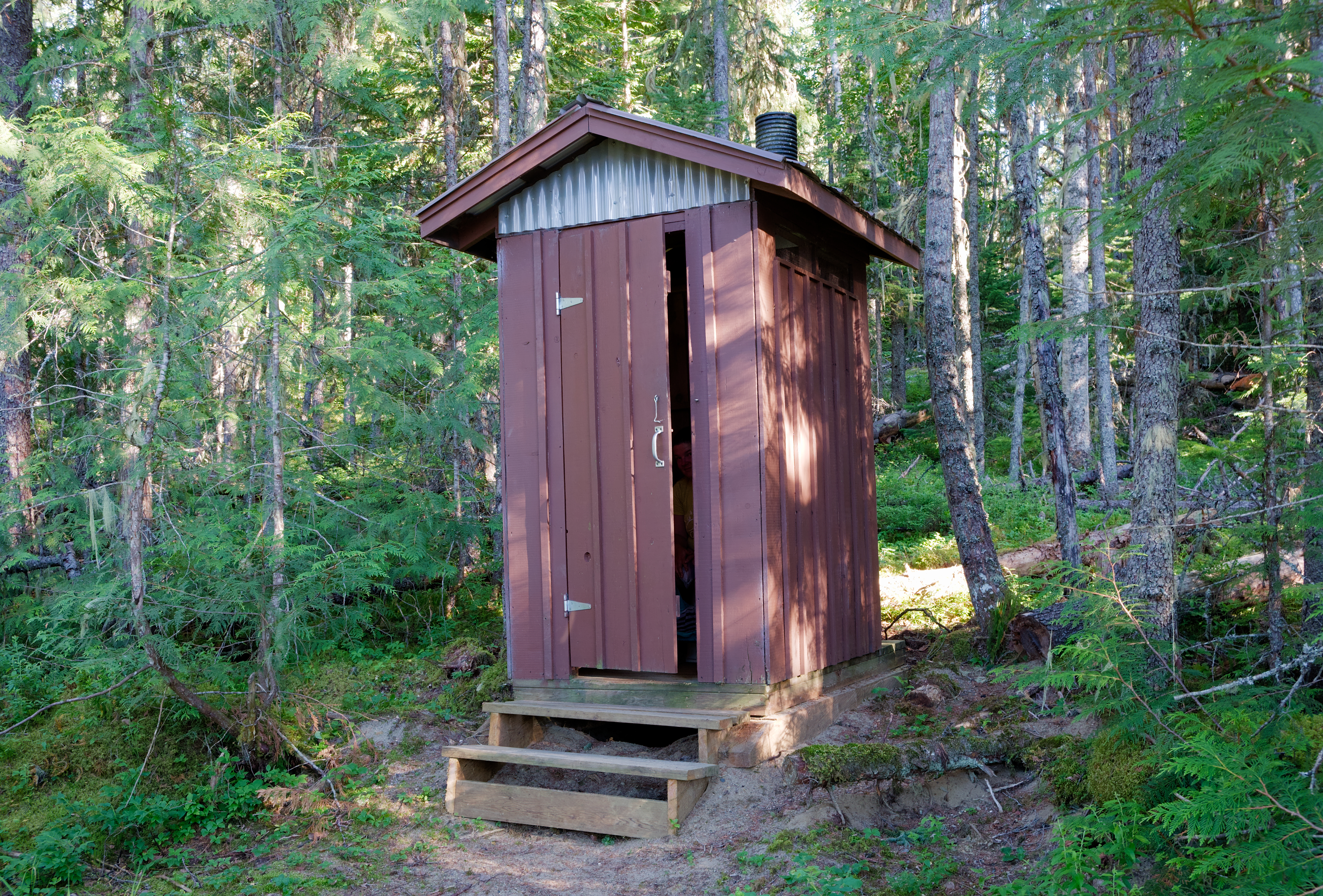
Outhouse in Bowron Lake Provincial Park, BC, Canada

== See also ==
- Chemical toilet
- Latrine
- Outbuilding, a building that is part of a residential or agricultural complex but detached from the main sleeping and eating areas
- Passenger train toilet
