= Dunny (disambiguation) =

Dunny is Australian/New Zealand slang for a toilet.

Dunny may also mean:

- Dunny Goode (1929–2004), head football coach for Eastern New Mexico University
- "Dunny", nickname for Fred Dunlap (1859–1902), 19th century baseball player and manager
- "Dunnies", nickname for the Whitby Dunlops, a Canadian Major League Hockey team
- "Dunny", a toy produced by the company Kidrobot, similar to the Munny
- Dunny (Bluey), episode of the Australian children's TV show Bluey

== See also ==
- Dunnie, a character in Anglo-Scottish folklore
- D'ni from the Myst franchise
- Duny, childhood name of the character Ged (Earthsea)
