= Jon Burgerman =

English artist

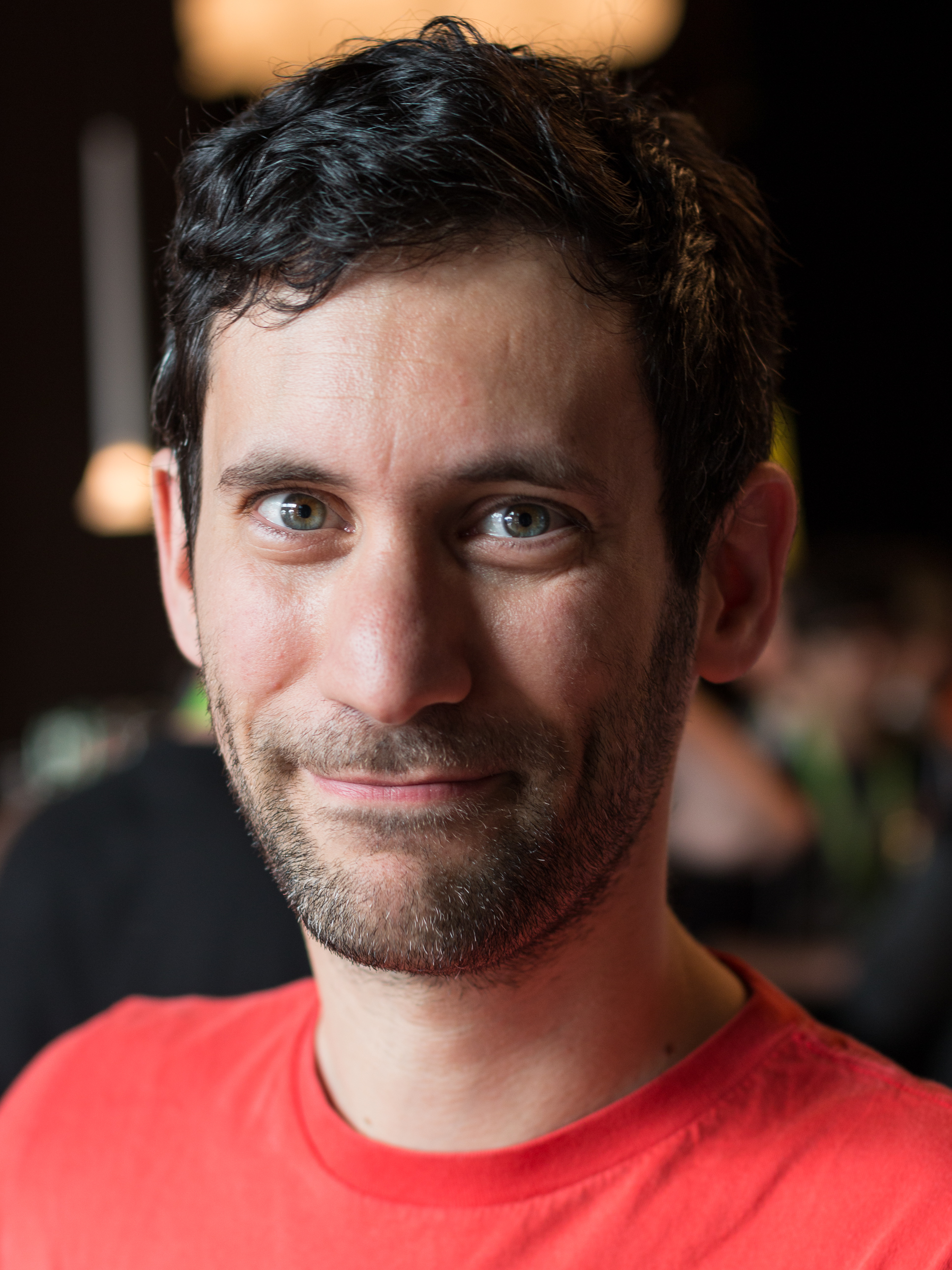
Burgerman at the Beyond Tellerrand conference in 2014

Jon Burgerman is an English artist living in New York, US.

== Life and work ==
Jon Burgerman studied art foundation in Bournville, Birmingham, England. He graduated in fine art from Nottingham Trent University in 2001.

In 2004, he designed both the Burgertown track and the Turboweevel ship for Wipeout Pure's European exclusive DLC called Omega pack.

In 2008, he appeared as a guest on the BBC TV show: Blue Peter and he was part of the original The Underbelly Project, which saw artists exhibit in an incomplete 100-year-old subway station deep underneath the streets of New York City.

The year 2008 also saw the publication by IDN of a 300-page monograph of Burgerman's work, Pens Are My Friends, whilst Kidrobot released the 14-piece mini figure vinyl toy collection "The Heroes of Burgertown".

In June 2009, Media Molecule released the "Jon Burgerman Original Sticker Kit" for the video game LittleBigPlanet, a downloadable add-on featuring 72 of his doodles to be used as in-game graffiti.

Examples of Jon Burgerman's work are in the public collections of London's Victoria and Albert Museum and Science Museum.

Penguin Random House published Burgerman's first picture book SPLAT! in 2017. Chronicle Books published It's Great to Create in 2017 and Oxford University Press published Rhyme Crime in the UK. Laurence King Publishing published two of his books, Daily Doodle and his coloring book Burgerworld.

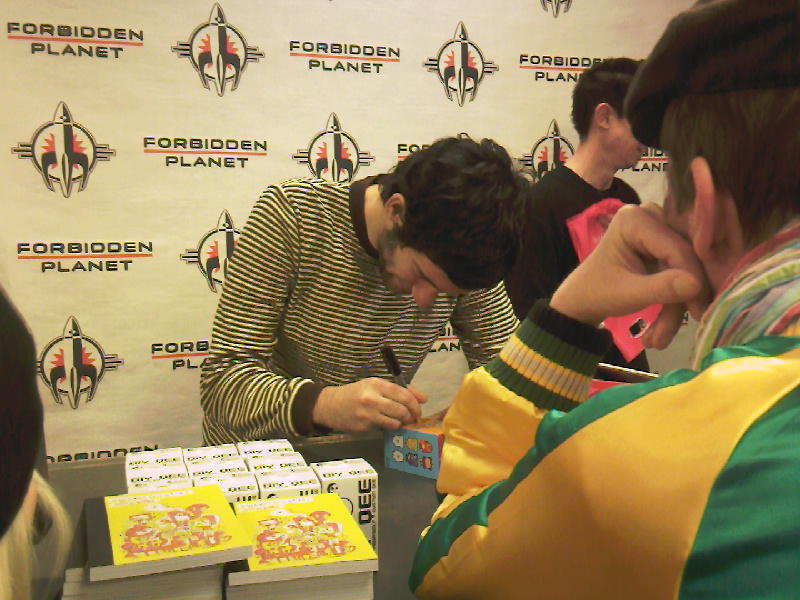
Burgerman at Forbidden Planet.

The New York Times featured Burgerman in the Fashion & Style section of August 1, 2017 highlighting his Instagram stories and book It's Great to Create. In September 2017, filmmaker Bas Berkhout documented Burgerman's studio and family history in a short film called The Story of Jon Burgerman.

In 2026, Jon Burgerman presented “Hold On, It Won’t Last Long,” his first solo exhibition in New York, featuring a mix of paintings and installations that balance humor with more introspective themes; the show also included inflatable hot dog sculptures, reflecting his interest in playful, accessible forms that extend beyond traditional gallery settings.
