= Sket One =

American illustrator (born 1970)

- Born: Andrew Yasgar; August 16, 1970 (age 56)
- Areas: Graffiti Artist, Illustrator

Sket One (born August 16, 1970) is an American artist. He was raised in New Haven, Connecticut. He started off his artistic career as an American graffiti artist in the 1990s he created and ran Unitee Clothing, a shirt design company, while looking for full-time work as a designer. He eventually landed a position as Creative Director for the Silverman Group.

== Art and career ==
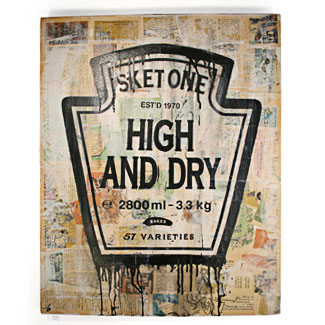
"High & Dry" for Night & Day Solo Show

=== Toys ===
Sket's career moved forward with his inclusion in the first series of Dunny blind-boxed mini-figures in 2004, produced by at the time little known Kidrobot. Sket made and continues to make the most of the newfound exposure by designing figures for several designer vinyl companies including Kidrobot, Red Magic, Kaching Brands, Solid Industries, and 3D Retro. Collectors became familiar with Sket's art through his toys.

While Sket first made his name in designer toys with production figures such as his Dunny Designs. The Dunny shape, which is a curved toy bunny created by Tristan Eaton with a smooth face is designed to be repainted and reinterpreted by artists from many different backgrounds. Sket was featured in at least four series produced by Kidrobot. General toy production pieces were also created, including self-designed and limited release figures such as vegetable-based Eggster and Buckeye Rot and Stay Puft Marshmallow Man-esque Ripple and the Dripple. More corporate toys were also designed by Sket, including a figure for the 3" Trexi series promoting Coca-Cola in 2008. In 2012, he produced a custom shell for Boombotix, as part of their artist series.

Sket began to start experimenting in the growing popularity of the custom toy culture. Customs are one-off hand-painted versions of existing toys. One of Sket's first customs, the "Cover My Soul Dunny" remixed paint company Sherwin-Williams’ paint can splash logo by turning the ‘ball’ into the Death Star, a symbol of the evil empire. Beyond the strong 3D imagery of paint pouring out of a can and onto the toy, the Star Wars reference invited viewers to discover meaning on their own terms.

"From the fully functional "Operation" Munny based on the interactive surgery game of the same name to his inspired melding of an imperial speeder with the imagery and symbols of legendary daredevil, Evel Knievel. His recent "product" customs transforming several different toys into well-known food item containers from Hershey syrup to Tropicana Orange juice jugs. In 2013 Sket combined Huy Fong Foods' Sriracha Sauce design and the Dunny shape. He also used the same design and concept with his Sketinguishers, which are fire extinguishers with different artistic images. All pieces are now owned by David Tran, the owner of Huy Fong Foods.

His work, both custom toys and original 2D pieces, have been shown in numerous galleries across the country including his inclusion in the Beyond the Cel show (September, 2007) at the Mesa Arts Center in Arizona. This museum show featured the work of artists who have made a name for themselves incorporating cartoon imagery into their fine art. He was also showcased in the This is not a Toy exhibit at the Design Exchange Museum in Toronto, which was curated by Pharrell Williams.

Sket also designed skateboards for Zooyork and Stoked.org, skateboard trucks for Grind King Trucks, snowboards for Crispy Whips, and in 2013 worked with the Loyal Subjects and Hasbro on the Transformers Brand.

Notable art works include a live painting for Ford Flex Roofs at the NY Auto Show in 2008 and a live painting for Namco Galaga's 30th Anniversary in 2011 at E3 Los Angeles.

His work can also be seen in art books such as Dot Dot Dash, Full Vinyl, I Am Plastic 1 and 2, N+1 Dimension Illustration, and on packaging for the Heinz Ketchup Dunny bottle.

== Original toys produced ==
- Dripple, produced by Mana Studios and released in 2011
- Buckeye Rot, produced by Wheaty Wheat and released in 2008
- The Elementals, produced by MindStyle released in 2007
- Ripple, produced by Kaching Brands and released in 2007
- Oil, produced by Red Magic and released in 2007
- Sket Bots, blind-boxed series produced by Kidrobot and released in 2007
- Eggster, released in 2005

== Selected solo shows ==
- Braaap, Kimura Gallery, Anchorage Alaska 2011
- Rewind, Kidrobot Miami, 2009
- You Asked For It, London and Birmingham, UK, 2008
- Snake Eyes, CiRCA, Toronto, 2008
- Night and Day, My Plastic Heart, New York, 2007
- Authentic Happiness, Channel 1 Gallery, New Haven CT, 2006
- Playjorizm, Kidrobot, 2004
- Being Labelled Trouble, Kidrobot NYC, 2004
