= Ivana Helsinki =

Finnish fashion company

IVANAhelsinki corporate logo.

Ivana Helsinki is a Finnish fashion brand.

The company was founded by designer Paola Anneli Ivana Suhonen together with her sister Pirjo Suhonen in 1998. It launching its first collection in August at the same year consisting of seven products in dark blue denim, under the brand name "Ivana Helsinki". Ivana Helsinki's head office and flagship store are located in Helsinki.

In 2007, Ivana Helsinki was the first Nordic company ever to participate in the Paris fashion week. In September 2010 Ivana Helsinki launched its first collection in New York fashion week, Ivana Helsinki is the only Finnish fashion brand accepted in the official IMG calendar in the New York fashion week. In February 2013, Ivana Helsinki showcased their newest collection Rotterdam at the New York fashion week.

In addition to her work with Ivana Helsinki, Paola Suhonen has designed products, concepts and patterns for many companies and associates. Suhonen is a film making graduate from the American Film Institute in Los Angeles.
