= Kubrick (toy) =

Japanese toy line

Kubrick (キューブリック, Kyūburikku) is a line of collectible block-style figures and associated products created by Japanese toy company MediCom Toy Inc. Kubrick figures are produced in three scales, designated as 100% (six centimeters high), 400% (24 centimeters high), and 1000% (60 centimeters high). The basic Kubrick figure design has a body that resembles an extremely simplified human form, somewhat similar in appearance to Playmobil or Lego figures. Produced in limited numbers and not re-released, Kubricks are highly sought after by collectors. Kubricks are predominantly collected by adults; the packaging recommends the figures to collectors 13 years or older.

== Overview ==
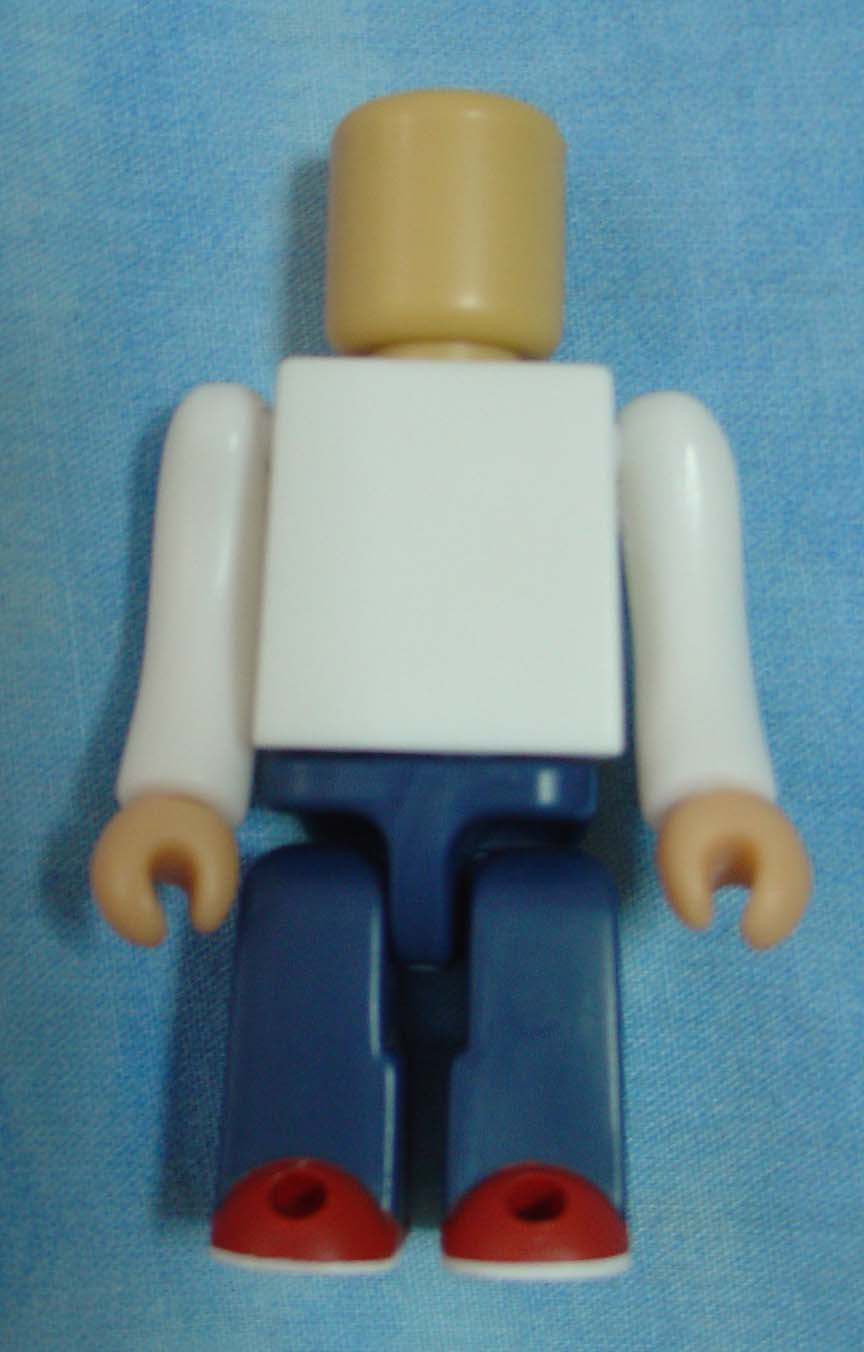
Basic Kubrick figure

"Kubrick" was chosen in honor of director Stanley Kubrick. In further homage to the film-maker, the Kubrick logo is designed in the style of the logo created for his movie A Clockwork Orange. By linguistic coincidence, the name Kubrick may also be seen as a hybrid word of the Japanese word kyu, meaning the number nine, and the English word brick. Nine is the number of bodyparts used in a standard Kubrick figure: head, torso, hips, two arms, two hands, and two legs; the English word brick is collector's jargon for LEGO elements, and refers to the similarity of Kubricks to Lego Minifigures.

Kubricks have been produced in many themes. Many figures are licensed representations of film, comic book, or video game characters. Among this diverse range of sources is an even more diverse range of subjects: MediCom has produced Kubricks based on the films The Great Escape, Star Wars, The Nightmare Before Christmas, The Usual Suspects, and Amélie among many others. Comic book characters may be of Japanese origin, such as the Berserk series, or American, such as figures based on Marvel Comics and DC Comics characters. In the instance of the Blythe series, MediCom has created a figural toy with another figural toy as its subject. However, not every Kubrick draws on popular culture for inspiration; in addition to creating likenesses of breakfast cereal mascots, MediCom has released a likeness of Andy Warhol, as well as Kubricks in Eames patterns and Pantone colors. They also offer Grand Theft Auto III, Grand Theft Auto: Vice City,Grand Theft Auto: San Andreas, Grand Theft Auto IV and Grand Theft Auto V sets.

Tatsuhiko Akashi, founder and president of MediCom, developed the basic Kubrick with a former employee of LEGO. The first Kubrick figures were representations of characters from the manga and anime series Neon Genesis Evangelion, released in 2000. Since then, hundreds of Kubricks have been produced.

== Packaging ==
The packaging design for Kubricks is as varied as the figures themselves. The most common packaging is the "blind box," in which individual 100% scale figures are packed in small boxes; the only way to know which particular figure is inside a particular box is to purchase and open the box.

In blind box assortments, figures are sold in cases of 12, and each case of 12 figures is further packed into a "master" case of four cases. If a particular collection features six characters, the figures may be packed one each of three of the characters, two of the fourth character, three of the fifth character, and four of the sixth character. This case of 12 figures is then packed four times into a master case, and the ratio may change again, as a result of "chase" figures. Chase figures are produced in addition to the common figures in an assortment; they are neither listed on the box nor announced alongside other new products. In a master case, a chase figure may appear with a ratio of 1:48, or even 1:96. The term for these figures is apt, as collectors must "chase" after these elusive items. For this reason, chase figures are extremely difficult to find, and are among the most sought-after pieces for Kubrick collectors.

Blind box packaging with the addition of chase figures creates an element of chance in purchasing Kubricks, and prompts some collectors to trade figures among themselves to complete their collections.

Some assortment figures are packaged in identifiable small boxes, in contrast to blind box figures. Whether in blind box assortments or not, figures released in assortments are designated as regular or hikimono. In addition to regular figures, there are limited edition Kubricks released separately from the regular figures, often packaged on cards with plastic blisters, as well as sets, in which multiple figures or accessories are sold as a single unit, usually packaged in window boxes. Promotional pieces are typically packed in translucent plastic bags.

== Distribution ==
Although Kubricks have captured the interest of collectors all over the world, MediCom focuses primarily on the Japanese market, to the extent that MediCom's online store ships only to Japanese addresses. Furthermore, Kubricks created as promotional items are not officially sold at retail in Japan. Many pieces are distributed as a part of a larger promotion, such as the wolverine figure released to commemorate the film X-Men 2: X-Men United (only available as a limited edition promotional only giveaway with advance ticket purchase for the cinema), or the Master Chief figure, offered as a not-for-sale promo exclusive in Japan for the Halo 2 video game.

== Related toys ==
The collectible value of Kubricks, and the mathematical probability involved in purchasing blind box figures, has unintentionally encouraged the creation of bootleg figures. These unlicensed reproductions are usually produced with low-quality plastic and are easily distinguished by their sloppy paint applications. Kubricks have also inspired other companies to create block figures, including Minimates, produced by the American company Art Asylum.

In response to the success of Kubricks, MediCom have also created an extensive collection of Be@rbricks, figures of a similar size, but that resemble an anthropomorphized bear with a pot belly, as well as B@wbricks, Kubrick-style dogs that stand on four legs.

== See also ==
- Bearbrick
