= Design Festa =

Biannual fashion and music festival in Tokyo

International Art Event Design Festa, abbreviated as Design Festa, is a large art, performance, fashion and music festival and convention, held biannually at the Tokyo Big Sight convention center in Japan. The event was founded in 1994, and anyone with original work to display is eligible to participate, regardless of genre.

== History ==
Design Festa (originally Design•Festa) was founded in 1994 by former Fashion designer and stylist Kunie Usuki. The first event was held on 11 September 1994 and featured 830 booths displaying a mixture of performance, installations and painting.

In 2011, more than 8,500 artists from around the world took part in Design Festa, and more than 60,000 people visited the exhibits.

By 2013, the convention had been held more than 35 times and more than 10,000 artists participated.

At Design Festa vol.47 in May 2018, the convention welcomed 59,921 visitors and 15,000 artists; the largest amount in the history of the event.

== Festival events ==
Design Festa includes a mix of events from music, painting, food and fashion to Crafts, photography, toys and performances. Health services, fortune-telling and the illegal sale of Copyrighted work have been prohibited since 2011.

The festival has a large booth area, which includes a "Dimmed Lighting" section. The 30th festival introduced Mini Live Paint areas and Kids Areas. The theatre area includes a 300-inch screen for film and video exhibitions. The main performance space features fashion exhibitions, music performances and dance. There is also a stage for live concerts. There is a separate restaurant, café and bar area which includes 13 to 15 international restaurant stalls.
