= List of Berkeley High School (Berkeley, California) people =

The following is a list of individuals associated with Berkeley High School (California) through attending as a student, or serving as a member of the faculty or staff.

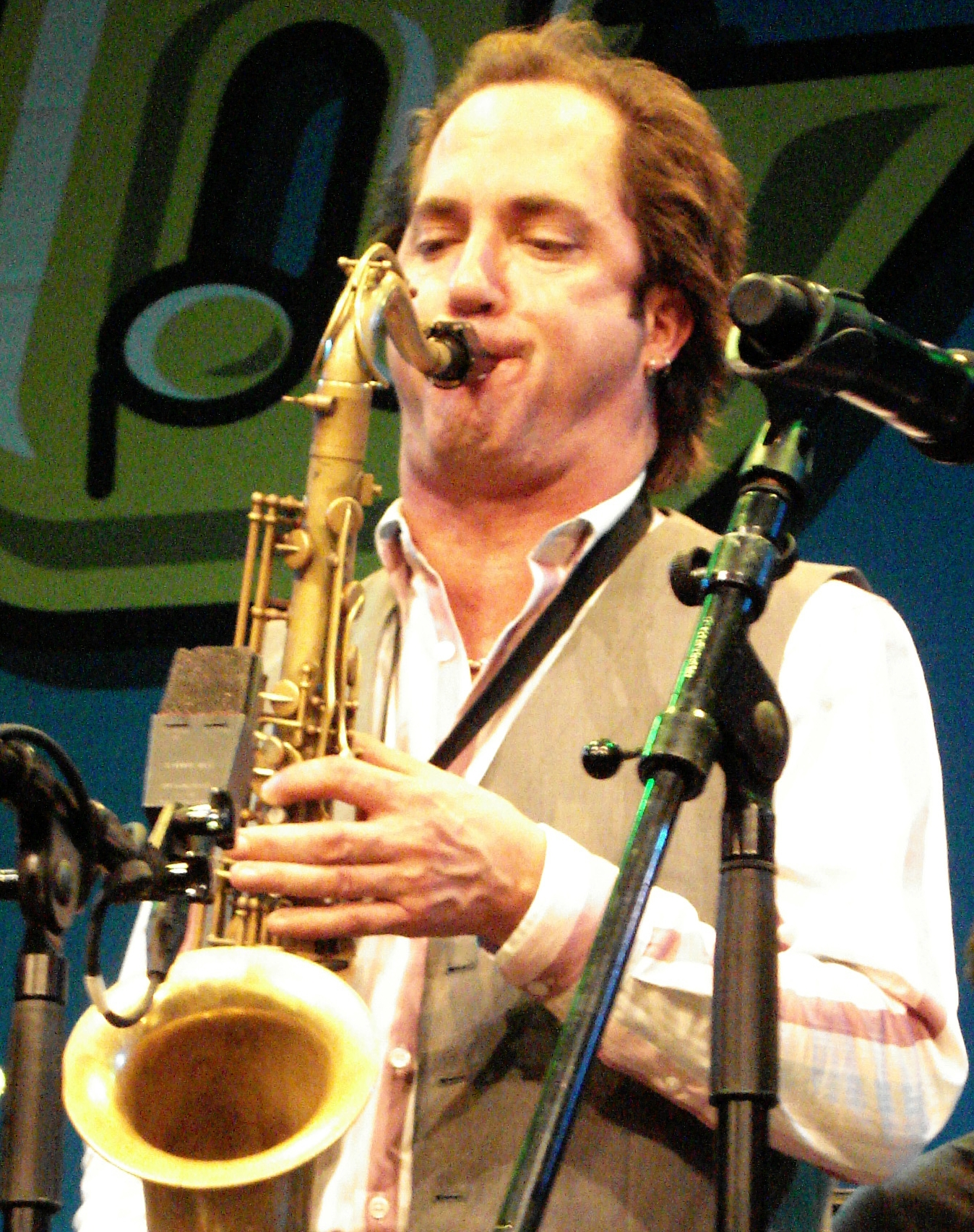
Peter Apfelbaum

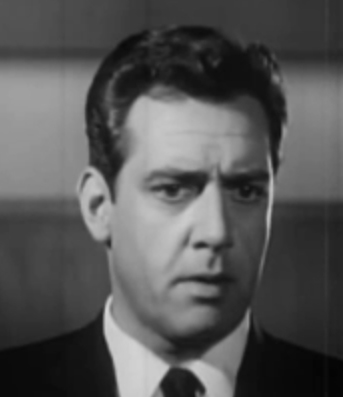
Raymond Burr

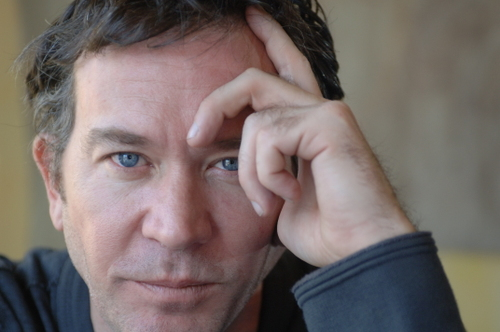
Timothy Hutton

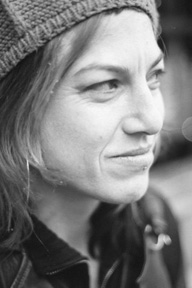
Shelley Jackson

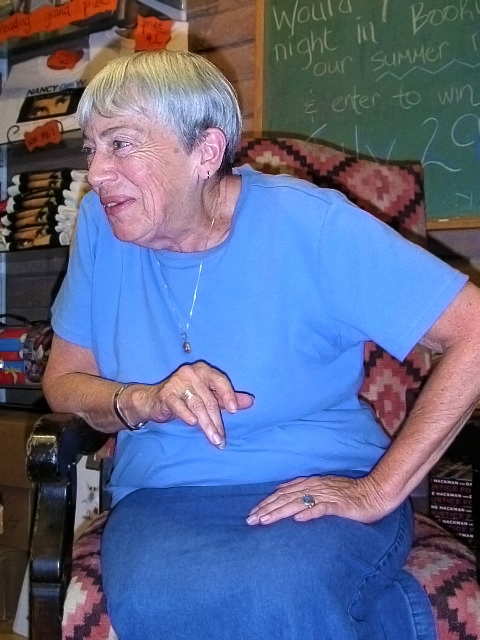
Ursula K. Le Guin

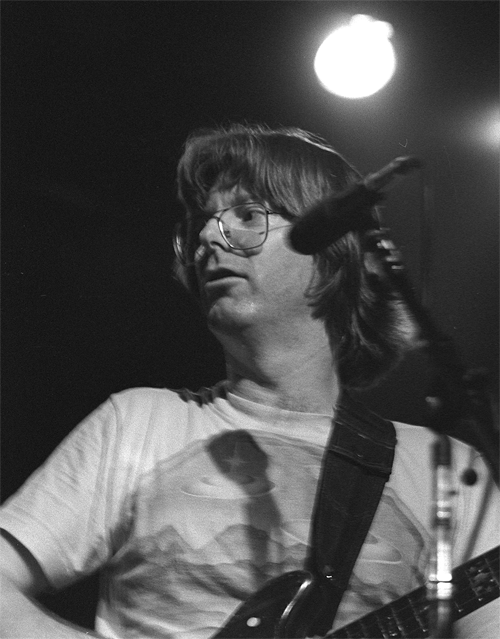
Phil Lesh

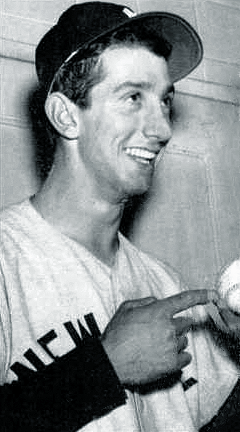
Billy Martin

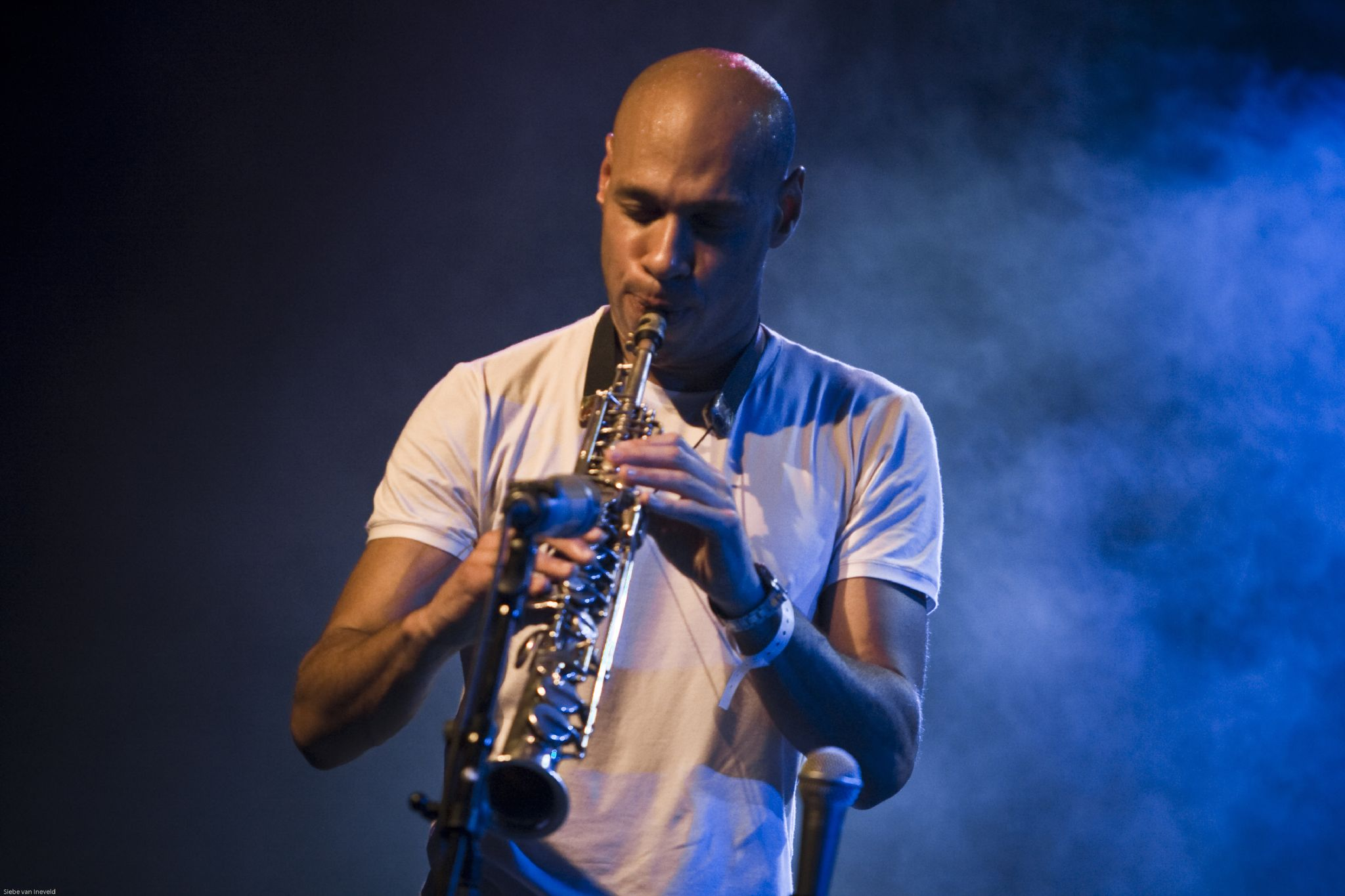
Joshua Redman

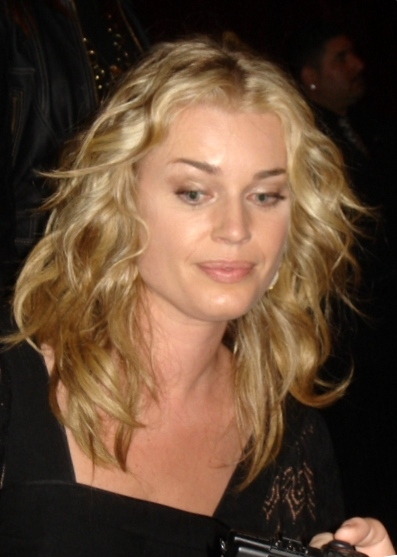
Rebecca Romijn

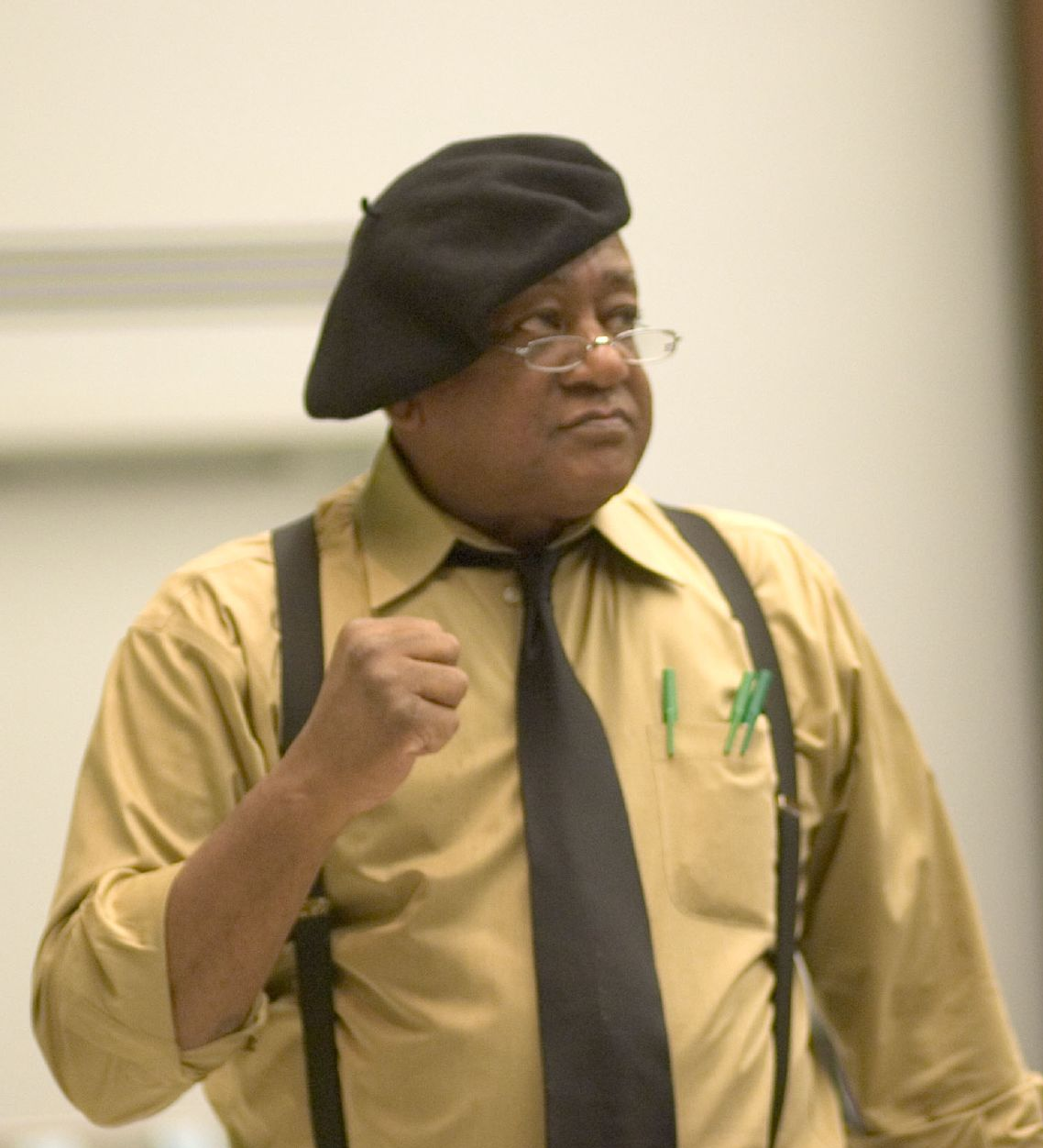
Bobby Seale

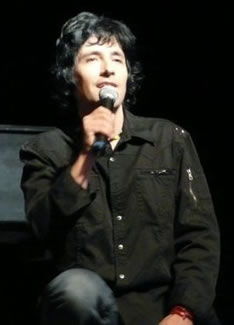
Kyle Vincent

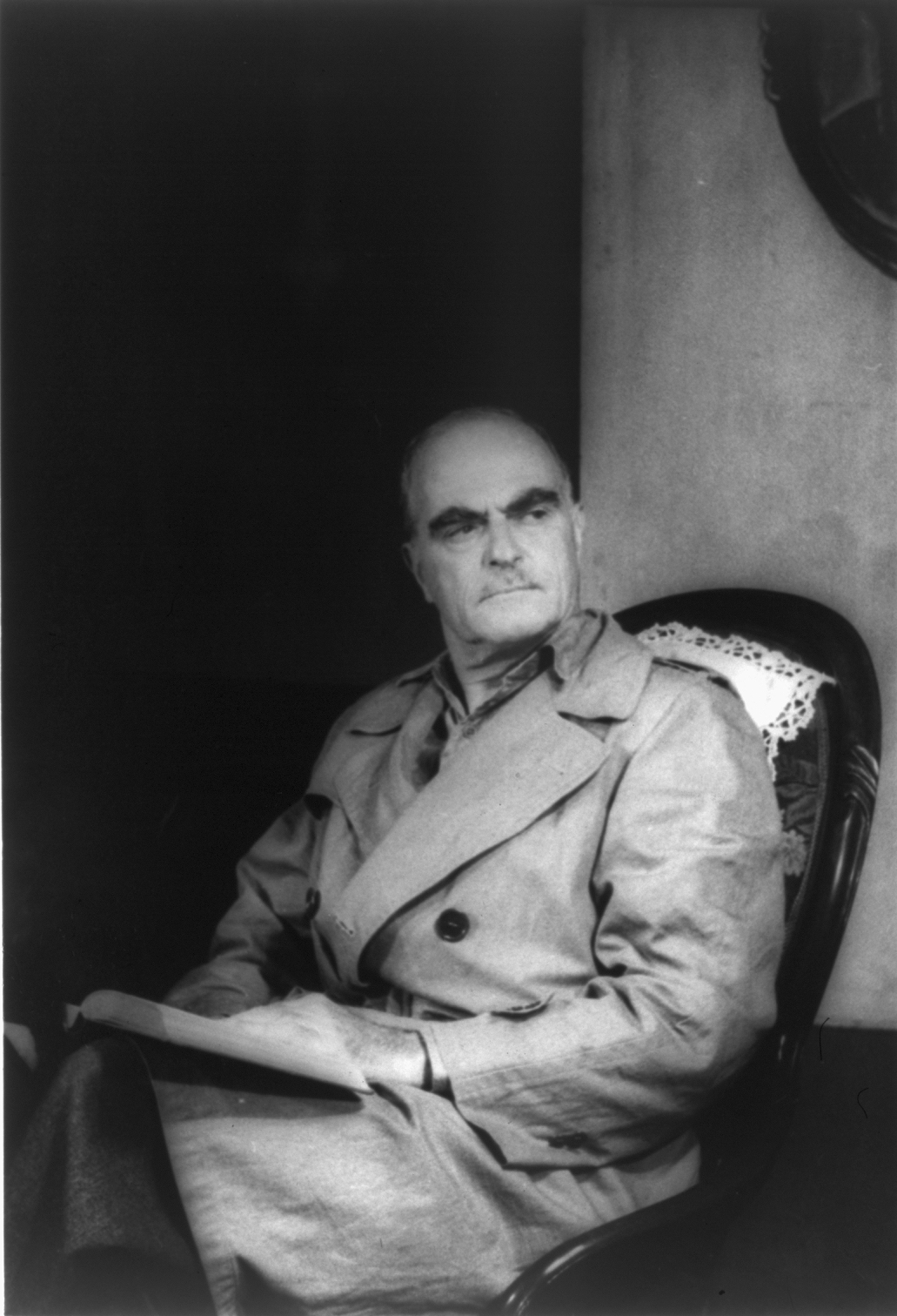
Thornton Wilder

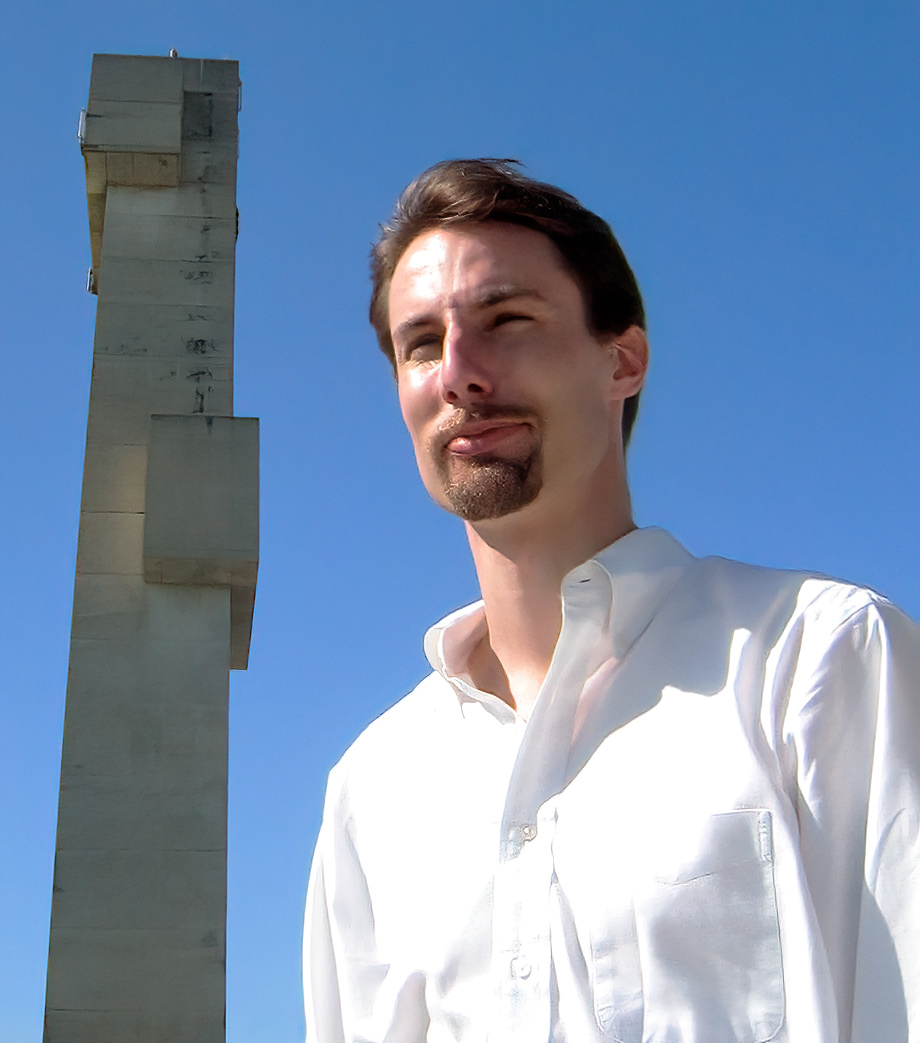
Bill Woodcock

== Notable alumni ==
=== Activists ===
- Bob Avakian, 1960, head of Revolutionary Communist Party
- David Brower, 1928, president of Sierra Club; founder of Friends of the Earth
- John Froines, 1957, Chicago Seven defendant, state track title team member, UCLA professor
- Bobby Seale, 1954, co-founder of Black Panther Party

=== Actors ===
- Raymond Burr, 1935, actor
- Rafael Casal, actor, writer, producer
- Justin Chu Cary, 2000, actor
- Robert Culp, 1947, actor
- Daveed Diggs, 2000, actor, producer, rapper (Hamilton)
- Richard Gant, 1961, television and film actor
- Nina Hartley, 1977, adult film actress
- Timothy Hutton, 1978, film and television actor
- Paul Mooney, 1959, actor, comedian
- Rebecca Romijn, 1990, model, actress
- Andy Samberg, 1996, actor, former cast member of Saturday Night Live
- Akiva Schaffer, 1995, comedy writer and director, Saturday Night Live writer and director
- Adivi Sesh, Tollywood actor
- Jorma Taccone, 1995, comedy writer-actor, Saturday Night Live writer

=== Artists and photographers ===
- Reuben Heyday Margolin, 1988, artist/kinetic sculptor
- Galen Rowell, 1958, wilderness photographer; did much work for the Sierra Club
- Bruce Ryan, 1971, production designer
- Ariel Schrag, 1998, cartoonist/graphic novelist

=== Athletes ===
- Chidi Ahanotu, 1988, football defensive end for the Tampa Bay Buccaneers of the NFL
- Shooty Babitt, 1977, Major League Baseball player, Oakland A's
- Don Barksdale, 1941, All-American basketball player at UCLA; first African-American on US Olympic basketball team (1948); first African-American to play in NBA All-Star game (1953)
- Rich Barry, Major League Baseball outfielder for Philadelphia Phillies
- Brittany Boyd, 2011, basketball player
- Glenn Burke (1970 Athlete of the Year), Major League Baseball player
- Phil Chenier, basketball player for the Washington Bullets in the 1970s
- Je'Rod Cherry, football player; won three Super Bowls with the New England Patriots
- Merv Connors, former MLB player (Chicago White Sox)
- Bill Durkee, 1939, National Basketball League player for the Minneapolis Lakers
- Jack Faszholz, former MLB player (St. Louis Cardinals)
- Leah Freeman, 2020, soccer player
- Augie Galan, former MLB outfielder
- Hal Gilson, former MLB pitcher
- Jacob Grandison, 2016, College Basketball player for Holy Cross and Illinois
- Chick Hafey, 1921, Major League Baseball player; won two World Series with St. Louis Cardinals; had first hit in All-Star Game history
- Kamani Hill, 2004, soccer player; forward for Colorado Rapids
- Ruppert Jones (1973 Athlete of the Year), Major League Baseball player; 2-time All-Star
- Jack LaLanne, 1935, fitness educator
- Ray Lamanno, former MLB catcher
- John Lambert, basketball player at University of Southern California and in NBA
- Billy Martin, 1946, Major League Baseball player; second baseman for five New York Yankees World Series teams in the 1950s, and manager of four playoff teams (Twins, Yankees, Detroit, A's), including one championship
- Lawrence McGrew, 1975, football player, linebacker for New England Patriots, New York Giants 1980–1991
- Walter Murray, gridiron football player
- Hannibal Navies, 1995, football player
- Steve Odom, football player, wide receiver for Green Bay Packers 1974–1977
- Gene Ransom, basketball player for University of California, Berkeley
- Jeff Ransom, former MLB catcher
- Earl Robinson, former MLB player
- Claudell Washington, Major League Baseball outfielder
- Jason Young, former MLB pitcher

=== Authors, journalists, and poets ===
- Miguel Almaguer, c. 1995, correspondent, NBC News
- Peter J. Aschenbrenner, 1963, author
- Belva Davis, 1951, journalist
- Philip K. Dick, 1947, author of Do Androids Dream of Electric Sheep?, on which the movie Blade Runner was based, and many other books
- Aaron Cometbus Elliott, 1986, writer/publisher of Cometbus zine, musician
- Vincent Duffey, 1911, playwright
- David Gordon, 1961, editor of Harvard Crimson, economist, syndicated columnist
- Sandra Gulland, 1962, novelist
- Shelley Jackson, author of Patchwork Girl
- Ursula K. Le Guin, 1947, science fiction author of the Earthsea series, The Left Hand of Darkness, and many other books
- Thomas Levenson, 1958, science writer, author of Newton and the Counterfeiter, Einstein in Berlin and other books
- Leza Lowitz, 1980, author, poet, editor, journalist
- Ariel Schrag, 1998, autobiographical graphic novelist
- Joel Selvin, 1967, rock music critic and author
- Frank Somerville, 1976, television news anchor, KTVU Oakland
- Ricardo Sternberg, 1967, poet
- Tess Taylor, 1995, poet and CNN contributor
- Elizabeth Treadwell, 1985, poet
- Shannon Wheeler, c. 1984, cartoonist, author of Too Much Coffee Man; published in The Onion, The New Yorker, and Mad magazine
- Charlotte Wilder, c. 1915, poet, sister of Thornton Wilder
- Thornton Wilder, c. 1915, novelist and playwright

=== Educators ===
- Shirley A. R. Lewis, c. 1956, former president of Paine College
- Joshua Fogel, c. 1968, professor emeritus of Chinese and Japanese history at York University
- Fred Rowley, 1965, internationally recognized pioneer in the education of generic pharmaceutical manufacturing technology

=== Entrepreneurs ===
- Paul Budnitz, 1985, founder of Kidrobot and Ello
- Ben Horowitz, c. 1984, businessman, investor, blogger, and author

=== Filmmakers ===
- Amir Bar-Lev, 1990, documentary director/producer
- Gregory Hoblit, 1962, television and film director
- Ian Inaba, 1989, music video/film director
- Leah Meyerhoff, 1997, Student Academy Award-nominated filmmaker
- Dave Meyers, 1990, music video/film director
- Michael Ritchie, 1956, film director
- Colin Tilley, 2006, music video/film director (including music videos for Chris Brown and Justin Bieber)

=== Mathematicians, scientists and inventors ===
- Richard Bolt, 1928, physics professor at MIT with an interest in acoustics; created BBN ("modem" and "e-mail")
- John Brillhart, 1948, mathematician, author of books on large-number factorization
- Andrew Gleason (graduated elsewhere), mathematician
- Sam Ruben, Dec.1930, co-discoverer of C14, a radioactive isotope of carbon, in 1940; the isotope led to many advances in the fields of biochemistry and medicine as well as its use in carbon dating for archeology
- Steve Selvin, biostatistician behind the ‘Monty Hall' problem
- Pei-Yuan Wei, 1986, (魏培源, pinyin: Wèi Péiyuán), created ViolaWWW, one of the first graphical web browsers
- Bill Woodcock, 1989, developed anycast DNS, and built more than 100 Internet exchange points around the world

=== Media ===
- Megan Greenwell, journalist and editor-in-chief of Deadspin and Wired.com
- Sam "Kobe" Hartman-Kenzler, 2004, esports commentator
- Dawn Monique Williams, 1996, theatre director

=== Musicians ===
- Ambrose Akinmusire, 2000, jazz trumpet player
- Peter Apfelbaum, 1978, multi-instrumentalist/composer of Hieroglyphics Ensemble
- Will Bernard, 1977, guitarist
- Steven Bernstein, 1979, jazz trumpeter, slide trumpeter, arranger/composer and bandleader
- Stephen Bishop, 1958, classical pianist also known as Stephen Bishop-Kovacevich and Stephen Kovacevich
- Kevin Cadogan, 1988, rock guitarist, formerly of Third Eye Blind
- The Cataracs, indie-pop duo
- Aaron Cometbus, drummer in punk bands Crimpshrine and Pinhead Gunpowder, author of Cometbus fanzine
- DJ Hollygrove- Grammy Winner, DJ and on air radio personality, attended, Class of 2002
- DJ Fuze, hip hop DJ and record producer
- Gabriela Lena Frank, 1990, classical composer and pianist
- G-Eazy, 2007, rapper, songwriter
- Benny Green, 1980, jazz pianist
- Charlie Hunter, 1985, jazz guitarist
- David Immerglück, 1979, multi-instrumentalist/guitarist for Counting Crows, Camper Van Beethoven and the Monks of Doom
- Joe and Eddie (Joe Gilbert and Eddie Brown), folk singers
- Greg 'Curly' Keranen, 1973, bassist, The Rubinoos, Jonathan Richman and the Modern Lovers
- KSHMR, 2006, electronic musician, record producer
- Stephen "Doc" Kupka, 1964, founding member/baritone saxophone of Tower of Power
- Phil Lesh, 1957, Grateful Dead bass player
- Jesse Michaels, singer of the East Bay punk band Operation Ivy, Common Rider; son of writer Leonard Michaels
- Johnny Otis (1921–2012), musician, record producer, disc jockey
- Jeff Ott, 1988, vocalist/guitarist of Crimpshrine and Fifteen
- Lenny Pickett, Saturday Night Live saxophone player
- Julian Waterfall Pollack, 2006, jazz pianist
- Thomas Pridgen, drummer for The Mars Volta
- Joshua Redman, 1986, jazz musician
- Alex Skolnick, 1987, guitarist of the thrash metal band Testament
- Tone Capone, hip-hop producer and DJ
- Geoff Tyson, guitarist and record producer
- Evanora Unlimited, 2018, record producer, multimedia artist
- The Uptones, ska band
- Kyle Vincent, contemporary pop recording artist/singer-songwriter, producer
- Donald Weilerstein, 1958, classical violinist, founder of Cleveland String Quartet, faculty member at Juilliard School
- Kate Wolf, née Allen, 1960, folk singer/songwriter

=== Politicians ===
- Audie Bock, 1963, California politician and film scholar
- Shirley Dean, 1950, Berkeley City Council member 1975–1982 and 1986–1994, and mayor 1994–2002
- Matthew Denn, 1984, lieutenant governor of Delaware 2009–2014, attorney general of Delaware 2015
- Elihu Harris, 1965, mayor of Oakland, California, 1991–99
- George Livingston, first elected African-American mayor of Richmond 1985–1993
- Aaron Peskin, 1982, former president, San Francisco Board of Supervisors
- Nick Sinai, former deputy chief technology officer of the U.S. and gov-tech pioneer

== Notable faculty ==
- Charles L. Biedenbach, principal of Berkeley High
- Pumpsie Green, first black player for the Boston Red Sox; coached baseball at Berkeley High for many years
- Edgar Manske, member of the College Football Hall of Fame, former assistant football coach at Cal under Pappy Waldorf; taught biology at Berkeley High for 20 years (1955–1975)
