= Huck Gee =

- Mark Gee
- Born: 19 May 1973 (age 53); Newcastle upon Tyne, England
- Occupations: Contemporary artist, illustrator, toy maker, designer
- Website: huckgee.com

Mark Gee (born 19 May 1973, in Newcastle upon Tyne, England), better known professionally as Huck Gee, is a contemporary artist, illustrator, toy maker, and designer best known by toy enthusiasts for his iconic "Skullhead" character. Since the early 1990s he works and lives in San Francisco, California.

== Work ==
=== Designer Toys and Kidrobot Collaborations ===
Influenced by the Japanese Edo period and Hong Kong pop art, Huck creates illustrations and custom figures and has released production toys through Kidrobot including figures for The Standard and DJ Qbert. In 2005, Huck Gee released the "Skullhead Project", a joint venture between Kidrobot and Barneys New York in conjunction with five top fashion designers: Marc Jacobs, Jil Sander, Dries van Noten, Rick Owens, and Duckie Brown. With this project, each designer would reproduce their 2005 Spring collections, and dress them on 12" figures of Huck's Skullhead character.

In October 2007, Gee's second original character, "Akuma Bomb" was released. In the winter of 2007, three Kidrobot toys were accepted into the permanent collection of the Museum of Modern Art in New York City, including a "Hello My Name Is" 8" Dunny figure, designed by Gee in collaboration with Paul Budnitz and Tristan Eaton. Huck has also consigned several pieces for one of the world's leading fine art auction houses at Christie's. In June 2015, Huck revealed that he had severed ties with Kidrobot and was producing his own toy platform called "The Blank." By 2017, Huck Gee Inc. ceased operations and released its final self-produced figure.

=== Three Apples Hello Kitty exhibition ===
In the Fall of 2009 Huck participated in the 35th Anniversary celebration for Hello Kitty called Three Apples hosted by Sanrio. Three Apples was a three-week long multifaceted convention and exhibition celebrating all things Hello Kitty.

=== Ken Block Design Project ===
In 2010, Huck collaborated with rally racer and co-founder of DC shoes, Ken Block. A version of Huck's famous Skullhead was designed as a logo for Block's Monster World Rally Team WRC entitled "Blockhead". The logo shows Ken's number "43″ implanted on the forehead of a square stylized skull. In the Spring of 2010, the creators at United Front Games asked Huck to feature in an "Artist Spotlight" for the game ModNation Racers.

=== Published in books on designer toys ===
Huck’s toys have been photographed and published in numerous books dedicated to the collection and appreciation of vinyl designer toys. These include Dot Dot Dash: Designer Toys, Action Figures, and Character Art by Robert Klanten and Matthias Hübner (2006), I Am Plastic by Paul Budnitz (2006), Toy Giants by Daniel and Geo Fuchs (2007), Flux: Designer Toys by Shawn Wright (2010), and I Am Plastic Too by Paul Budnitz (2010).

=== Participation in This Is Not a Toy ===
In 2014 Huck participated in the "This is Not a Toy" exhibit at the Design Exchange Museum Canada in Toronto, ON. It was the first major exhibit of designer urban toys in the world and guest curated by Pharrell Williams. Huck's work can be found in the editorial companion to the exhibit, titled by the same name, "This is Not a Toy."

=== Co-founding Superplastic ===
In 2018, Huck Gee co-founded Superplastic alongside Paul Budnitz, with the vision of blending physical designer toys with digital artwork and pop culture influences. Superplastic has produced designer toys and collectibles and has collaborated with major pop icons like The Weeknd and Post Malone.

Gee was instrumental in creating Superplastic's flagship characters, "Janky" and "Guggimon," which have become synonymous with the brand itself. His work with the company has incorporated elements of digital art and multimedia into the design and production process. Superplastic has released limited-edition collectibles, some of which have sold out following release.

=== Collaboration with Gorillaz ===
In 2020, Gee worked with the Gorillaz universe through a partnership with Superplastic. The release included figures depicting band members, including a 12-inch figure of the character 2D. According to published information, the figures represented the first Gorillaz toy releases in several years. The project later expanded to include additional figures, such as the GEEP and Astronaut 2D releases..

=== Failed Kickstarter Project: The Worlds of Huck Gee ===
On August 27, 2024, Huck Gee launched a Kickstarter campaign titled The Worlds of Huck Gee: Skullhead, Gold Life & Beyond. The campaign reached its funding goal within its initial launch period. 795 backers pledged $237,971 to help bring this project to life. On October 31, 2025, the project was canceled. Gee cited increased manufacturing costs and tariffs as primary factors affecting production feasibility. He subsequently published a general breakdown of project expenses, which were only general estimates with no proof. It is also revealed in his breakdown he used $34,000 from the funds to “[sustain] operations and living expenses,” while backers pointed out $25,000 still remained unaccounted in his totals. The project did not proceed to fulfillment, and backers did not receive completed rewards or refunds.

=== F*cked Up, Funny, Humiliating, Beautiful, Chaotic ===
In December 2025, Gee published F*cked Up, Funny, Humiliating, Beautiful, Chaotic - Act I , the first volume in a planned multi-act memoir series, with additional acts announced for future release.
