= Andrew Bell (artist) =

American artist (born 1978)

- Bell in 2026
- Born: Andrew Bell; October 27, 1978 (age 47); Guildford, England
- Education: B.F.A. School of Visual Arts, New York, NY (2000)
- Known for: Graphic arts
- Notable work: Android mascot figurines, Dead Zebra
- Website: www.deadzebra.com

Andrew Bell (born October 27, 1978, in Guildford, England) is a British-born American artist and founder of Dead Zebra Inc. He specializes in creating collectible designer toys. Bell also works in a variety of other mediums from illustrations and paintings to sculptures. His company and toys have been featured in publications such as the New York Times.

== Career ==
Bell began his graphic arts career as an intern at Marvel Comics while attending the School of Visual Arts in New York. After completing his internship, he continued to work there for another two years as a freelance designer. From 2000 to 2005, he worked for Nickelodeon as a senior designer. Bell left Nickelodeon in 2005 in order to focus on his own projects and his company, Dead Zebra.

Dead Zebra is small business in which Bell operates mainly, with a separate Dyzplastic division for design and production. Figurines are notably limited production.

Bell collaborates with various designers, such as those from Kidrobot. His first original toy, produced in 2005, was entitled Groob. This piece featured a glow in the dark skeleton and included a fabric cloak and a scythe. Another example of Bell's original designs is the O-No Sushi series of toys, based on Japanese food.

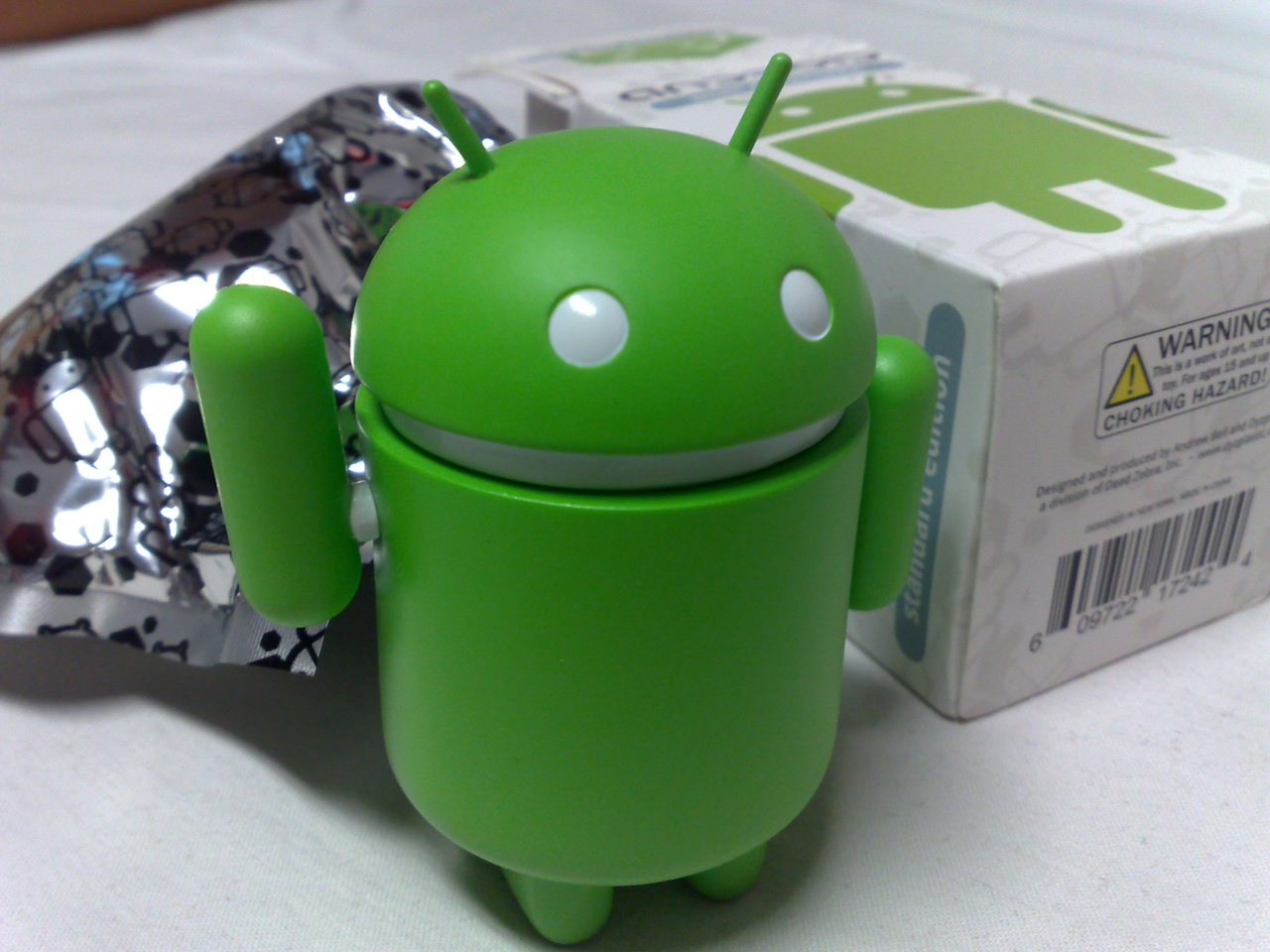
Bell's most popular works include the Android series figurines.

Bell's collaboration with companies such as Google have opened up awareness of designer toys to new audiences. His collaboration with Google resulted in a set of vinyl collectible figurines based on the Android mascot.

== Artwork ==
Bell has produced many forms of art, including drawings, paintings, sculptures and toys which have all been featured in a variety of exhibitions. His art exhibitions have been produced for national and international audiences and showcase some of his more intricate pieces. In a 2009 exhibition he presented his Darth Vader Helmet at The Andy Warhol Museum.

Common themes seen in Bell's early works are parodies, with figure sets such as the Kill Kats and Kisses of Death candy mocks. These pair specifically would go on to be seen in legal troubles with Hershey's, who would accuse Bell of trademark infringement.

== Publications ==
Bell has published three art books. The first book was a small softcover book entitled You've Gone Too Far, it had a limited run of only 666 copies. Bell's second book was entitled Now You've Done It: A Collection of Creatures. His latest book is entitled Do Not Eat!: A Collection of Creatures by Andrew Bell. His work has been featured in two other books by Paul Budnitz about designer toys, I Am Plastic by Paul Budnitz, and I Am Plastic Too: The Next Generation of Designer Toys.
