= David Uzochukwu =

Austrian-Nigerian photographer, born 10 December 1998

- Born: David Ejikeme Uzochukwu; Innsbruck, Austria
- Citizenship: Austrian–Nigerian
- Education: Humboldt-Universität zu Berlin
- Known for: Photography
- Awards: EyeEm, Flickr's 20 Under 20
- Website: Official website

David Ejikeme Uzochukwu is an Austrian–Nigerian art photographer with a focus on portrait photography who lives and works in Brussels and Berlin.

He is queer.

== Early life and education ==
Born David Ejikeme Uzochukwu in Innsbruck, Austria, to an Austrian mother and a Nigerian father. He was raised in Innsbruck, before moving to Luxembourg and Brussels. He has since lived in Vienna and Berlin where he studies towards a Bachelor of Fine Arts in philosophy at Humboldt-Universität zu Berlin.

== Career ==
Uzochukwu began taking pictures at an early age. Already competent using his mother's point-and-shoot camera at age 10, he started sharing his photographs more widely at the age of 13. At 16, Uzochukwu went professional and signed with Iconoclast Image and Gallery 8. At 17, FKA Twigs handpicked Uzochukwu to shoot a significant campaign for Nike in Mexico.

Uzochukwu has created campaigns for clients like Adobe Photoshop, The Paris Opera (Opéra National de Paris), Dior, Nike, Iris van Herpen, and World Wildlife Fund, and worked with artists such as FKA Twigs, Ibeyi, Benjamin Clementine, Labrinth, Little Dragon, and Pharrell Williams.

In 2016, his series A Familiar Ruin was shown at BOZAR Center for Fine Arts as part of the group show Dey Your Lane!, curated by Nigerian Azu Nwagbogu.

== Work ==
Uzochukwu started with Self-portraiture and evolved to photographing Portraits in nature. His photography combines post-production and intimate portraiture, frequently imparting images with an aura of isolation hanging over his body in physical manifestations of smoke, clouds, water, and fire. His surreal images present, for example, blue skies that become walls, crystals that float in midair, volcanic sand that becomes a comforting shroud, or blood that turns into a mask.

His work has often conveyed his observations on race and queerness. At Unseen Amsterdam, for instance, he premiered a series of photographs which used the image of humanoid water creatures, equipped with fins, tails, or sharp teeth. In 2019, Uzochukwu was quoted saying that these works express 'what it means to be dubbed 'black," to have an oppressive notion of race imposed upon, and to thrive nonetheless.'

His work is inspired by artists such as American photographer Gregory Crewdson and Kenyan-American artist Wangechi Mutu, whose works construct personal universes that conflate gender, race, art history, and personal identity.

== Recognition ==
In 2014, he was named EyeEm Photographer of the Year, as well as one of Flickr's inaugural 20under20. In 2015, he was among the few selected for Adobe Photoshop's 25 Under 25 and received the Canon x Exhibitr Student Photography Award. In 2019, he was selected for the CPH:LAB 2019/2020, the talent development program of CPH:DOX Copenhagen International Documentary Festival.

In 2021, Uzochukwu was nominated for Prix Pictet, and showed his work at the Victoria and Albert Museum among others.

In 2025, he was featured in the Forbes "30 Under 30 Europe: Art & Culture 2025" list for his innovative visual storytelling and high-profile collaborations with artists and brands such as FKA twigs, Nike, and Iris van Herpen.

== Exhibitions ==
- FOM Foto Maastricht, 6211-kunskwartier, Maastricht, August 2014
- Flickr Friday: A Living Room, iGNANT, Berlin, January 2014; co-organised with Fantastic Frank
- Flickr, 20 Under 20, curated by Vogue photo director Ivan Shaw, Milk Studios, New York, NY, October 2014
- The EyeEm World Tour 2015, traveled to Alte Teppichfabrik, September 2014; NUMA, Paris, November 2014; EyeEm Studio San Francisco, San Francisco, CA, 14 November 2014; Roppongi Hills, Tokyo, November 2014; Art basel miami, The Lab Miami, Miami, FL, December 2014; Tokyo Institute of Photography, Tokyo, December 2014; Haus der Universität, Düsseldorf, 30 January 2015, as part of Düsseldorf Photo Weekend; Soho House Toronto, Toronto, 25 February 2015; Openhouse Gallery, New York, NY, 26 March 2015
- Unlocked, curated by Vassilis Zidianakis, ATOPOS Contemporary Visual Culture, Athens, February–April 2016
- Africa Salon – mo(ve)ments: African Digital Subjectivities, Yale School of Art, New Haven, CT, March 2016
- Whispering Stills, Never Apart, Montréal, April–July 2016
- Dey Your Lane !, curated by Azu Nwagbogu, BOZAR Center for Contemporary Art, Brussels, June–September 2016
- Lagos Photo Festival, Inherent Risk; Rituals and Performance, curated by Azu Nwagbogu, Eko Hotel & Suites, Victoria Island, Lagos, October–November 2016
- 27th Festival of African, Asian and Latin American Film Cinema, Where Future Beats, curated by Azu Nwagbogu and Maria Pia Bernardoni, Casello Ovest di Porta Venezia, Milano, March 2017; co-organised by Lagos Photo Festival, Lagos
- Portraits, Photo Brussels Festival 02, Hangar, Photo Art Center, Brussels, November 2017 – January 2018
- Songe du Présent, MuPHo Musée de la photographie de Saint Louis, St Louis, Sénégal, May 2018; organised on the occasion of Dak'art Biennale 2018
- Innate: Future Blooms (Djeneba Aduayom), La Villa Rouge, Dakar, May 2018; as part of the exhibition Bridge curated by MuPHo Musée de La Photographie de St Louis, on the occasion of Dak'art Biennale 2018
- Transparent, Kalonoma Festival, Munich, 5 May 2018
- When Ethics meets Aesthetics, Vogue Italia initiative, Leica Gallery Milano, Milan, June 2018
- Liquid Thunder, An Immersive Soundscape Experience With David Uzochukwu, MONOM, Berlin, 13 October 2019; (solo exhibition with sound installation by William Russell)
- PhotoVogue Festival 2018, Embracing Diversity, curated by Alessia Glaviano and Francesca Marani, BASE Milano, November 2019
- Unseen Amsterdam, September 2019; represented by Gallery Number 8, Brussels
- PhotoVogue Festival 2019, A Glitch in the System, curated by Alessia Glaviano and Francesca Marani, BASE Milano, November 2018
