= The Chevy Chase Show =

1993 American variety television series

- Written by: Fred Wolf
- Starring: Chevy Chase
- Announcer: Ron Russ
- Music by: Tom Scott and the Hollywood Express
- Country of origin: United States
- Original language: English
- No. of episodes: 29

Production
- Production locations: The Chevy Chase Theater, Hollywood, California
- Camera setup: Multi-camera
- Running time: 45–48 minutes
- Production companies: Cornelius Productions; 20th Television

Original release
- Network: Fox
- Release: September 7 – October 15, 1993

The Chevy Chase Show is an American late-night talk show hosted by Chevy Chase that aired on Fox from September 7 to October 15, 1993. The program marked Fox's return to weeknight late-night talk programming nearly five years after the cancellation of The Late Show.

Developed during a period of increased competition in late-night television following Johnny Carson's retirement from The Tonight Show, the series premiered shortly after CBS's Late Show with David Letterman. It received strongly negative reviews and rapidly declining ratings, falling below two million viewers during its final weeks. Fox canceled the program after less than six weeks on the air.

== Development ==
Fox announced in April 1992 that Chevy Chase would host a new late-night comedy and talk show as part of a broader agreement with 20th Century Fox under which he would star in, produce and develop television and film projects. The network initially planned the program for six nights a week beginning in the fall of 1993.

Fox initially considered Dolly Parton as host of its planned late-night program. Parton declined, and her manager, Sandy Gallin, suggested Chevy Chase to Fox executive Lucie Salhany.

The series was developed as Fox's return to weeknight late-night programming following the cancellation of The Late Show. Chase and the producers said they wanted to avoid a conventional talk-show format. Executive producer Steve Binder described the program as primarily a comedy show built around unpredictability, with Chase surrounded by other performers and making use of locations outside the studio. Chase similarly said shortly before the premiere that he preferred to describe it as a "late-night comedy show" rather than a talk show and planned to incorporate sketches and other elements associated with his work on Saturday Night Live.

Fox leased the former Aquarius Theatre on Sunset Boulevard in Hollywood, gutted and renovated the building, and renamed it the Chevy Chase Theatre for the program. The network had announced by May that the show would premiere there on September 7, 1993.

== Format and production ==
The Chevy Chase Show followed the basic late-night format of an opening monologue, comedy segments, celebrity interviews and musical performances, but Chase and the producers initially sought to distinguish it from competing talk shows through sketches and less structured comedy. Chase produced the series through his company, Cornelius Productions.

The program originated from the former Earl Carroll Theatre on Sunset Boulevard in Hollywood, which Fox renovated and renamed the Chevy Chase Theatre. The set, designed by Bruce Ryan, was intended to resemble a large living room and included a 20-foot aquarium containing tropical fish, bookshelves, toys and basketball hoops. Chase's desk incorporated a functioning piano.

Saxophonist Tom Scott served as musical director and led the house band, the Hollywood Express. Ron Russ was the program's announcer. Chase frequently interacted with the band and incorporated physical comedy into the program, including shooting basketballs at an onstage hoop during the closing credits.

The opening sequence used clay animation depicting Chase taking letters from Los Angeles landmarks to assemble the show's title. The sequence was created by animator Will Vinton and his studio.

== Episodes ==
According to newspaper listings, Chase's guests during the 29-episode run included:

- Week of September 6, 1993: Goldie Hawn, Whoopi Goldberg, Jason Priestley, Beverly D'Angelo, Harry Anderson, Martin Short, Kathleen Turner, Robert Townsend
- Week of September 13, 1993: Tom Selleck, Andrew Shue, Tim Matheson, Dennis Hopper, Anita Morris, Jennie Garth, Garrett Morris, Al Franken, Corbin Bernsen
- Week of September 20, 1993: Geraldo Rivera, Deborah Allen, Rita Rudner, Engelbert Humperdinck, Billie Jean King, Chris Evert, Sinbad, Janis Ian, Robert De Niro, Kenny Loggins, Dean Cain
- Week of September 27, 1993: Ron Silver, Jonathan Frakes, Sam Elliott, Pamela Anderson, Jamie Lee Curtis, Henry Rollins
- Week of October 4, 1993: Dan Aykroyd, Johnny Cash, Lauren Tom, Dave Thomas, Bob Saget, Queen Latifah, Doug E. Doug, Bill Nye, Joe Queenan, Michael Damian, Valerie Bertinelli, Taylor Dayne
- Week of October 11, 1993: Canadian Brass, Burt Reynolds, Lauren Holly, Dan Fogelberg, Maria McKee, A Martinez, Martin Sheen, Alexandra Paul, Jim Varney
- Guests scheduled for October 18, 1993 (cancelled): Elizabeth Ashley, Don Rickles

== Reception ==
The Chevy Chase Show received overwhelmingly negative reviews. Tom Shales of The Washington Post described the premiere as "a calamity of historic proportions", criticizing Chase's nervous delivery, interviewing and dependence on prepared material. Time similarly described Chase as "nervous and totally at sea", saying that he "tried everything, succeeded at nothing" and criticizing his recycling of older material and reliance on physical comedy.

Later in the run, Ken Tucker of Entertainment Weekly gave the program an F. He criticized Chase's interviewing and the increasingly unruly studio audience, writing that the crowd had become "the worst-behaved crowd in late-night television".

Chase acknowledged that the premiere had gone badly, attributing some of the problems to nervousness and saying that the program needed time to develop.

== Ratings and cancellation ==
Fox had promised advertisers that The Chevy Chase Show would attract between five and six million viewers a night, substantially more than the audience guaranteed for CBS's Late Show with David Letterman. Instead, the program averaged fewer than three million viewers, and by its final weeks its audience had fallen below two million.

Fox attempted to make changes during the run, including placing greater emphasis on celebrity interviews and reducing some of the comedy material, but the ratings did not improve.

On October 17, 1993, Fox chairwoman Lucie Salhany announced that the network was canceling the series after less than six weeks. She said the decision was made "in the best interests of both its affiliated stations and its star". Salhany later said that Chase had appeared extremely nervous during the early broadcasts and that the results had been uncomfortable to watch.

Chase responded that he had found the conventional talk-show format restrictive and said that it had differed from the type of program he originally wanted to make. The final episode aired on October 15, 1993.

After canceling the series, Fox returned the late-night period to its affiliates. The network subsequently explored other late-night projects, including discussions with Howard Stern, but did not establish another regular weeknight late-night talk show in the slot.

== Legacy ==
The failure of The Chevy Chase Show became part of Chase's public image. In 2002, TV Guide ranked it No. 16 on its list of the 50 worst television shows of all time; in 2010, TV Guide Network placed it at No. 16 on its list of the "25 Biggest TV Blunders".

Chase later said that the program Fox produced differed substantially from the show he had wanted to make. In a 2007 interview with Time, he said he had envisioned a darker, more improvisational program and would not attempt a similar talk show again. He repeated his dissatisfaction with the experience on Norm Macdonald Has a Show, and said his interview with Robert De Niro was one of the few aspects of the series he enjoyed.

Allusions to the show include a 1994 Doritos commercial aired during Super Bowl XXVIII. The advertisement depicted a production being abruptly canceled and Chase being removed from the studio lot, saying, "Tough year."
