= Megan Greenwell =

American journalist and editor

- Education: Barnard College
- Occupations: Journalist, editor
- Known for: Editor-in-chief of Deadspin and Wired.com

Megan Greenwell is an American editor and journalist. She was the first female editor-in-chief of Deadspin and editor of Wired.com. She has written for publications such as ESPN The Magazine, GQ, Esquire, and New York Magazine.

== Biography ==
Greenwell grew up in Berkeley, California. Her mother is an Episcopal priest who currently serves as the Dean of Christ Church Cathedral in Cincinnati.

She attended Berkeley High School, where she was a reporter for the school newspaper, Berkeley High Jacket, and uncovered an indentured servitude and sex ring operated by Berkeley's largest landlord, Lakireddy Bali Reddy, before receiving her B.A. from Barnard College in 2006. At Barnard, she was a fencer for the Columbia Lions fencing team and was the editor-in-chief of Columbia Daily Spectator.

Greenwell began as an intern, and soon covered the Iraq war from Baghdad for The Washington Post shortly after college. She later covered education and philanthropy and was part of The Washington Post team that won the 2008 Pulitzer Prize for breaking the Virginia Tech shooting. Greenwell was later the managing editor of GOOD Magazine, the inaugural features editor at New York magazine's lifestyle website The Cut and senior editor of ESPN The Magazine.

Greenwell was the executive features editor for Esquire.com and was hired as the fifth and first female editor-in-chief of Deadspin in 2018. She later became the editor-in-chief of Wired.com in 2019. She left her post in 2021, citing "burnout." She published her first book Bad Company: Private Equity and the Death of the American Dream in June 2025, in which she explores the world of private equity and how it upended the lives of four people in various industries around the country; the book was a finalist for the 2026 New York Public Library’s Helen Bernstein Book Award for Excellence in Journalism.

== Personal life ==
Greenwell is married to David Heller, an assistant professor of internal medicine and global health at Icahn School of Medicine at Mount Sinai.
