= Bruce Ryan =

Bruce Ryan may refer to:

- Bruce Ryan (rugby league)
- Bruce Ryan (production designer)
