= Berkeley High Jacket =

American high school student newspaper

- Type: Biweekly student newspaper
- Format: Broadsheet and Digital
- Editor-in-chief: Sydney Lehrer and Clara Tjen
- Headquarters: Berkeley, California
- Circulation: 3,300
- Website: berkeleyhighjacket.com

The Berkeley High Jacket (JKT, sometimes known as The Jacket) is the student newspaper serving the roughly three thousand students of Berkeley High School, California. Published since 1912, the paper gained national attention in 1999 when two student reporters, Megan Greenwell and Iliana Montauk, published an investigative piece that helped lead to the prosecution of local businessman Lakireddy Bali Reddy for sex trafficking and other criminal activities. This reporting won the Jacket staff the "Journalist of the Year" award from the Society of Professional Journalists Northern California Chapter. The paper since has won numerous awards from the Columbia Scholastic Press Association and the National Scholastic Press Association, including the 2022 NSPA Online Pacemaker Award.

== History ==
Edwin Madison Elam, Jr.
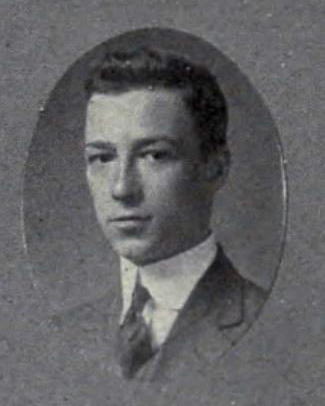
- Died: October 11, 1918; Forest of Argonne
- Education: Berkeley High School (1909-1913) University of California, Berkeley (1913-1917)
- Occupation(s): Founding Editor, Berkeley High Jacket Staff, The Daily Californian

The Jacket was founded as the Berkeley High School Weekly News in 1912 by Edwin Elam, Jr. and Arthur Earll. By the 1920s, the paper adopted its name from the mascot of Berkeley High School, the Yellowjacket, and over the years it was published variously as the Berkeley Jacket, Berkeley Straight Jacket, Straight Jacket, Berkeley High Straight Jacket, and the Berkeley Daily Jacket.

From around the mid-1950s into the early 1960s, the paper was a daily, printed by students in the school's own print shop. Most issues at that time were one-sheets, that is, two-sided, 8½ x 11 inch pages. Friday issues were usually four pages long.

The paper is published every other Friday and is usually sixteen pages long, with only the front, back, and two middle pages in color. There are six sections in the paper: news, opinion, features, entertainment, sports, and investigative. The staff of the Jacket includes more than one hundred and fifty student editors, reporters, photographers, and videographers as well as one faculty advisor. The Jacket's editorial board is composed of about forty-five students who are elected by the previous year's editors.

=== School Colors ===
In 1994, Frontline (PBS), produced a four-hour documentary about racial politics at Berkeley High School entitled School Colors, including a segment about the Jacket. The paper's editorial board was extremely vocal throughout the broadcasting of the program and the internal strife that followed.

=== Journalist of the Year ===
In 1999, the paper gained widespread prominence after reporters Megan Greenwell (former editor in chief of Deadspin, now at WIRED) and Iliana Montauk broke a story in Berkeley that resulted in criminal prosecution. The Jacket first reported that local business-owner Lakireddy Bali Reddy and his family were importing young women from India to work as sex slaves after one such woman died of carbon monoxide poisoning in a Berkeley apartment complex.

For this reporting, the Society of Professional Journalists awarded the Jacket staff its highest honor, Journalist of the Year, making it the first-ever non-professional winner of the award.

=== Yellowjackets ===
In August 2008, Berkeley Repertory Theater kicked off its season with Yellowjackets, a play written by BHS alumnus and former Jacket editor Itamar Moses about life at Berkeley High in the mid-1990s. Directed by Tony Taccone, Yellowjackets focused on many of the events depicted in School Colors, including conflict resulting after the Jacket failed to print two articles about Chicano-Latino student activities at the school.

=== Website ===
The Jacket's website was most recently rebuilt in 2020. The site utilizes the WordPress content management system as its backbone, after using Drupal for many years. The Jacket launched online in 1998 under the domain "jacket.org" before switching to "bhsjacket.com" and later to "berkeleyhighjacket.com." On March 19, 2010 The paper received the Golden Crown Award for the Jacket Online from The Columbia Scholastic Press Association, "the highest award given to a student publication by the Association." In 2011, the online portion received the Silver Crown Award from Columbia. Since then, the Jacket's website has received various other awards from the Columbia Scholastic Press Association and the National Student Press Association, including the 2022 NSPA Online Pacemaker Award.
