= Charles L. Biedenbach =

American educator

Charles L. Biedenbach (January 13, 1865 – September 15, 1942) was an American educator. He has been called the father of junior high schools for his advocacy of separating younger and older children in high school settings. He was well known for this advocacy in the educational circles of California in the early 1900s, and his leadership on this issue led to many significant offices.

== Biography ==
=== Early life and education ===
Charles Louis Biedenbach was born on January 13, 1865, in San Francisco, California. He attended San Francisco city schools, graduating from Boys High School in 1882. He earned a bachelor's degree from University of California, Berkeley in 1886 and a master's degree in 1894.

=== Career ===
Biedenbach taught in San Luis Obispo. In 1889 he returned to the Berkeley area as principal of the Peralta School. From 1892 to 1901 he taught mathematics at Oakland High School, after which he came to Berkeley as principal of McKinley school, which he developed into the McKinley Junior high school. In 1912 he became principal of Berkeley High School. In later years he served as president of the California Teachers Association and of the California High School Teachers' Association, Secretary-Treasurer of the State Council of the California Interscholastic Federation and on the Alameda County Board of Education.

=== Marriage and children ===
Biedenbach married the former Lulu C. Colby in 1887. The couple had five children: Charlotte (b. 1888), Elise (b. 1889), Anna (b. 1891), Carl (b. 1893), and Katharine (b. 1899). He was widowed in 1925 and married the former Elizabeth Cordes at the time of his retirement.

=== Death and afterward ===
Biedenbach died on September 15, 1942. He was interred in Mountain View Cemetery in Oakland, California.
