= Magnific =

Spanish generative AI and stock media company

- Formerly: Freepik (2010–2026)
- Type: Private
- Industry: Generative artificial intelligence Graphic design Software
- Founded: 2010
- Founders: Alejandro Sánchez, Pablo Blanes, Joaquín Cuenca
- Headquarters: Málaga, Spain
- Number of locations: 2
- Area served: Worldwide
- Key people: Joaquín Cuenca Abela (CEO)
- Owner: EQT
- Number of employees: c. 400 (2026)
- Website: magnific.com

Magnific (formerly Freepik) is a Spanish technology company that operates an online platform for generating and editing images, video and audio with generative artificial intelligence, together with a library of stock graphic resources. The company was founded in Málaga in 2010 as Freepik, a search engine and later a marketplace for design assets. It began adding generative AI tools in 2022 and video generation in 2025, and adopted the Magnific name in April 2026, taking it from an image-upscaling startup it had acquired in 2024. It is headquartered in Málaga and has an office in San Francisco.

In 2020 the private equity firm EQT acquired a majority stake in the company. In April 2026 the company reported about US$230 million in annual recurring revenue and more than one million paying subscribers.

== History ==
Freepik was founded in 2010 by brothers Alejandro Sánchez and Pablo Blanes together with Joaquín Cuenca. It began as a search engine for design resources and later expanded into producing and distributing its own stock content and subscription offerings.

During the COVID-19 pandemic, Freepik temporarily offered free access to resources for groups including healthcare workers and educators.

In June 2022, Freepik acquired the UK-based stock video and audio platform Videvo. In October 2022, Freepik acquired Iconfinder and Original Mockups.

By 2023, Freepik had opened an office in San Francisco. In October 2023, Freepik acquired the stock photography marketplace EyeEm after it filed for bankruptcy.

In May 2024, Freepik acquired the Spanish AI image upscaling startup Magnific.

Freepik began adding generative AI tools in 2022, after the release of DALL-E 2, and expanded into AI video generation in 2025. By April 2026 the company said video accounted for about half of its revenue.

On 28 April 2026, Freepik relaunched under the name Magnific, bringing its stock library, generative tools and the upscaling service under a single brand. At the time the company reported around US$230 million in annual recurring revenue, more than one million paying subscribers and about 400 employees, down from roughly 550 when its business was centred on stock images. It also described itself as profitable and "bootstrapped".

== Products ==
The platform provides tools for generating and editing images, video and audio, image and video upscaling, 3D tools and a shared workspace for teams, alongside a stock library that the company said in 2026 held more than 250 million assets. Rather than training its own frontier models, it gives subscribers access to third-party models, including Google's Nano Banana and Veo, Black Forest Labs' Flux and ByteDance's Seedance. Fortune reported in 2026 that the platform had been used in advertising for Puma and Carl's Jr. and in the production of the Prime Video series House of David.

In April 2025, Freepik released F Lite, an openly available text-to-image model developed with Fal.ai, which the company said was trained on commercially licensed, "safe-for-work" images.

In May 2025, Freepik launched Freepik Enterprise, a plan aimed at large organizations that includes centralized management and legal-related features for AI-generated content, according to reporting in Spanish and technology media.

In October 2026, Magnific released Magnific One, an image-generation model that interprets the prompt and reference images before generating, together with an optional "Brand Kit" feature that checks results against a customer's visual guidelines.
