= Talenthouse =

Social Network Site

- Company type: Public
- Website type: Social network service
- Available in: English, Spanish, French, German, Turkish, Russian, Portuguese
- Area served: Worldwide
- Owner: Talenthouse AG
- Key people: Roman Scharf, Co-Founder; Clare McKeeve, CEO; Maya Bogle, Co-Founder, MD London
- Website: www.talenthouse.com
- Registration: Required (to post/participate)
- Users: 3.2 million users
- Launched: June 2009
- Current status: Inactive

Talenthouse was a social network site owned by Talenthouse AG, a public company based in Switzerland that also owns other services including EyeEm and Ello.

== History ==
Talenthouse was co-founded in 2009 by Co-CEOs Amos Pizzey and Roman Scharf. The Talenthouse headquarters were originally located in Los Angeles, California, USA with offices in New York City and London.

In December 2019, Talenthouse was merged along with Ello and Zooppa into a new company named TLNT Holdings.

On 25 May 2021, investment company New Value AG acquired TLNT Holdings, Talenthouse, EyeEm, and Jovoto.

On 24 November 2021, New Value AG changed its name to Talenthouse AG

In March 2022, Talenthouse AG listed shares on the SIX Swiss Exchange.

== Funding ==
As of May 2012, Talenthouse had received $15.1 million of funding to date with a recently closed $4.2 million Series B round. Investors include Eric Schmidt's Innovation Endeavors, Reliance Entertainment, 3TS Cisco Growth Fund, Brett Ratner, Jean Pigozzi and Estée Lauder chairman William P. Lauder.

On 20 May 2014, the company announced securing a $10 Million Series C Funding round with investors Dave Stewart and Gerard Butler

In March 2019, Animoca invested US$2 million for 448,413 shares of preferred stock in Talenthouse.

== Acquisitions ==
In 2018, Talenthouse acquired the social network Ello for an undisclosed amount.

In June 2021, Talenthouse acquired EyeEm for close to $40 million.

In April 2022, it was announced Talenthouse had acquired the London-headquartered creative hiring platform, Creative Commission.

== Recognition ==
In May 2012, Talenthouse was named a Winner of the Red Herring Top 100 Award.

== Controversy ==
In February 2023, many creatives who had worked for Talenthouse came forward to reveal that they had not been paid for the work they had done. Roman Scharf, the co-founder of Talenthouse and chairman of the board, said: "We are extremely sorry for this unacceptable delay in payments and any inconvenience and upset it has caused. We take this matter extremely seriously and are working on a long-term robust solution that will benefit all Talenthouse creatives. This solution is well advanced and we plan to announce it soon." Whilst some clients have since paid artists directly, as of February 2023 the issue is believed to be ongoing with numerous artists working for other clients still owed money.

As of July 2023 Talenthouse is going through financial restructuring and seeking outside investors.
