= Ello (social network) =

Social networking website

- Website type: Social network
- Available in: English
- Owner: Talenthouse
- Commercial: Proprietary software; Freemium model planned
- Registration: Required to post, follow, or be followed
- Launched: March 2014; 12 years ago
- Current status: Inactive since July 2023

Ello was an online social networking service created by Paul Budnitz and Todd Berger in March 2014. It was shut down in July 2023.

== History ==
Ello began as a private social network consisting of seven artists and programmers. After a year of the social network being private, the creators redesigned the website and launched Ello to the public. Seed funding of $435,000 from the venture capital investor FreshTracks Capital in January 2014 helped sustain the company initially. This decision earned some criticism when the network achieved wider popularity.

Ello launched on March 19, 2014, complete with a manifesto that claimed to distinguish it from other social networks like Facebook. The site promised it would never sell user data, proclaiming "You Are Not a Product". The social network service officially launched on April 3, although membership registration was only by invitation.

Ello gained added attention in September 2014, when numerous members of the LGBTQ community left Facebook following the controversial enforcement of its real-name policy, thought to be intended to exclude drag queens in San Francisco. At its peak, the social network was processing more than 30,000 signup requests an hour. It is estimated that 20% of sign ups remain active on the site one week after registration.

In October 2014, Ello reorganized itself as a benefit corporation and raised a further $5.5 million in venture capital. In 2015 Ello launched its iPhone app, which has many similarities to the original website, including format. In 2016, Wired writer Charley Locke noted that the user base of Ello has shifted from early adopters of new social media to artists and other creative people. In 2018, Talenthouse acquired Ello for an undisclosed amount.

As of July 2023, the Ello social network is no longer available.

== Features ==
Initially influenced by Facebook, Ello later switched to a Pinterest-like focus on art, photography, fashion and web culture.

The Ello service claimed several notable distinguishing intentions as a social network such as never selling user data to advertisers or third parties, never showing advertisements, and not enforcing a real-name policy.

Ello provided some features like an emoji autocomplete, NSFW settings and hashtags, and was planning on adding others such as private messaging.

== Revenue ==
Ello was free to use, but was exploring a freemium model to finance future activities. It was also selling specially branded T-shirts in a partnership with Threadless to generate revenue. Additionally, the social network introduced a 'Hire Me' button in August 2016, followed by a 'Buy' and 'Collaborate Button' soon after that. The 'Hire Me' and/or 'Collaborate' buttons enabled users to be contacted by other community members, to either collaborate or offer their services. The 'Buy button' could be added to any post, and directed towards any online shop where the goods were sold. As such, Ello seemingly chose to turn to the affiliate revenue model to gain income.

== Reception ==
Ello had been criticized for its simple, minimalist design. Bona Kim of Gizmodo criticized the general bugginess of the website and accused it of trying too hard to look different from its main competitor, Facebook. One highly positive review expressed concern that Ello "seems fated to become the betamax of social media: superior to its competitor but failing to win popular traction. But it doesn't matter ... A social network doesn't need approval from everyone to work."
