= Tristan Eaton =

American graffiti artist (born 1978)

- Born: 1978 (age 47–48); Hollywood, California, U.S.
- Occupations: Graffiti artist, toy designer
- Notable work: Audrey of Mulberry; Dunny (designer toy)
- Website: www.tristaneaton.com

Tristan Eaton (born 1978) is an American artist. Primarily known for his toy designs and street art murals, Eaton is also a graphic designer and illustrator. In total, Eaton has painted about 100 murals around the world.

== Early life ==
Eaton was born in Hollywood, California in 1978. After living in London for a few years in his youth, his family moved to Detroit, where his father was born and raised, and he eventually attended Detroit's College for Creative Studies. He moved to New York City at 20 years of age and attended the New York School of Visual Arts. While in New York, under the pseudonym TrustoCorp, he used billboards and street signs to deliver political messages as a street artist. He returned to live in Los Angeles 15 years later.

== Career ==
=== Graphic and toy design ===
During his time in Detroit as a teen, while pitching his artwork at a local gallery, Eaton was introduced to Jerry Vile, the publisher of the alternative Orbit magazine, who gave him a job as an illustrator. In 1996, at the age of 18, a college instructor helped him sell a toy design to Fisher-Price. This experience laid the foundation for his future work in toy design.

In 2004, Eaton created the Dunny designer toy in collaboration with Paul Budnitz of Kidrobot. In 2006, Eaton collaborated with Burger King to create a vinyl designer toy for its “The Subservient Chicken” ad campaign.

Eaton created posters for Barack Obama's 2008 presidential election campaign.

In 2009, Eaton was the designer of Soul Train Music Awards for BET, a subsidiary of Viacom.

In 2020, Eaton designed the tickets and game program for the Super Bowl. That same year, he was commissioned by SpaceX to create an artwork that would be sent to the International Space Station in the shuttle Crew Dragon to entertain the astronauts aboard, and return to Earth with the crew. The work, titled Human Kind and made of gold, brass, and aluminum, features collages of popular culture in Eaton's idiosyncratic style.

=== Public murals ===
In the summer of 2013, Eaton painted the mural I was a Botox Junkie in the corner of Traction and East Third streets in the Arts District of Los Angeles. Also in 2013, Eaton created the mural Audrey of Mulberry in Little Italy, Manhattan, depicting the legendary actress and fashion icon Audrey Hepburn.

In 2014, Eaton painted a six-story public mural of Alexander Graham Bell, titled the Spirit of Communication, in West Palm Beach, Florida. On March 3, 2016, part of the wall that the mural was painted on collapsed. The entire wall and mural was demolished the same year.

Also in 2014, Eaton painted a large mural of Napoleon Bonaparte for the Nuit Blanche Festival in Paris, France. The work is based on the painting Napoleon Crossing the Alps by Jacques-Louis David and prominently features the words "The Revolution Will Be Trivialized".

In 2015, Eaton executed a commissioned mural for the Long Beach Museum of Art as part of the exhibition Vitality and Verve: Transforming the Urban Landscape.

In 2019, Eaton's Monster Mural, featuring Frankenstein, his Bride, and Dracula, along with other characters, was commissioned by and installed at Universal Studios, Los Angeles. In that same year, Eaton executed a 100-foot mural of the legendary actress and model Evelyn Nesbit on the 236 Fifth Avenue building in Manhattan, New York City titled The Gilded Lady.

In 2020, in Highland Park, Los Angeles, a vandal defaced a mural Eaton made depicting Martin Luther King Jr. In response, Eaton painted an image of a smiling Malcolm X to replace the original image.

In March 2026, it was revealed that Eaton designed the large-scale mural in the station for the Fast & Furious: Hollywood Drift roller coaster at Universal Studios Hollywood, which displays bright vivid colours showcasing the finale in the first film.

=== Exhibitions ===
In 2021, the Long Beach Museum of Art held a 25-year retrospective of Eaton's work titled "All At Once".

== Legal issues ==
In 2019, Eaton sued an Ottawa, Canada real estate developer for using a cropped image of Audrey of Mulberry in the promotional material for a student residence. This case highlighted the legal gray area between copyright ownership of street art and the commercial use of images of public spaces. This case was settled in 2021 with a public apology by the developer and a stipulation to refrain from ever using the image for commercial purposes.

== Collections ==
Eaton's work is included in the permanent collection of the Museum of Modern Art in New York City.
