= Elizabeth Treadwell =

American poet (born 1967)

Elizabeth Treadwell (born 1967) is an American poet. Her collections include LILYFOIL + 3 (O Books, 2004), Birds & Fancies (Shearsman Books, 2007), Wardolly (Chax Press, 2008), Posy: a charm almanack & atlas (Lark, 2015), and Penny Marvel & the book of the city of selfys (Dusie, 2018).

== Poetic style ==
Writing in Stride magazine, critic Nathan Thompson called hers "a difficult but deeply rewarding poetry. It has a precision and a tenderness all of its own." In Boog City, critic Maureen Thorson called Treadwell's "a feminine poetry, marvelous, tough, and unrelenting." Treadwell's work has also been reviewed in Rain Taxi, Jacket, The Believer (magazine), and elsewhere. Her work is discussed in The Boston Review May/June 2009 as part of "The New Thing: the object lessons of recent American poetry."

== Selected works ==
- Penny Marvel & the book of the city of selfys, Dusie Books, 2018
- Posy: a charm almanack & atlas, Lark Books & Writing Studio, 2015
- Virginia or the mud-flap girl, Dusie Books, 2012
- Wardolly, Chax Press, 2008
- Birds & Fancies, Shearsman Books, 2007
- The Graces (chapbook), Dusie wee, 2006
- Cornstarch Figurine, Dusie Books, 2006
- LILYFOIL + 3, O Books, 2004
- Chantry, Chax Press, 2004
- LILYFOIL (or Boy & Girl Tramps of America) (chapbook), Duration Press, 2002
- The Milk Bees (chapbook), Lucille Series, 2000
- Eve Doe: Prior to Landscape (chapbook), a+bend press, 1999
- Populace, Avec Books, 1999
- The Erratix & Other Stories (chapbook), Texture Press, 1998
- Eve Doe (becoming an epic poem) (chapbook), Double Lucy Books, 1997
- Eleanor Ramsey: The Queen of Cups, Fourteen Hills Press, 1997
