= EyeEm =

German technology company

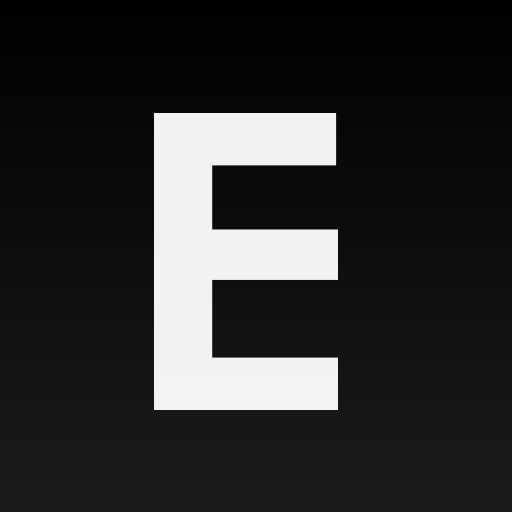
- Company type: Privately held company
- Website type: Photo sharing; Social Networking
- Dissolved: January 13, 2026
- Headquarters: Kohlfurter Str 41/43, Berlin, Germany
- Area served: Worldwide
- Owners: Talenthouse (2021–23); Magnific (2023–present)
- Founders: Florian Meissner; Ramzi Rizk; Gen Sadakane; Lorenz Aschoff
- CEO: Florian Meissner
- Employees: Over 70
- Website: www.eyeem.com
- Launched: 2011; 15 years ago
- Current status: Defunct (January 13, 2026)

EyeEm (originally Eye'em), pronounced "I am", was a German technology company that provided services related to photography. It was co-founded by Florian Meissner, Ramzi Rizk, Gen Sadakane, and Lorenz Aschoff in Berlin in 2011.

With a community of over 18 million users and 70 million photos as of August 2016, the company used artificial intelligence to find the images to license to brands, agencies or individuals. Eyeem.com and the EyeEm mobile app offered photographers the ability to share photographs and discuss photography.

In June 2021, it was acquired by Talenthouse. In October 2023, six months after the German company filed for bankruptcy, it was announced that EyeEm had been acquired by Magnific.

In December 2025, EyeEm announced that the platform would shut down permanently on January 13, 2026.

== History ==
In early 2010, photographers Florian Meissner, Ramzi Rizk, Gen Sadakane and Lorenz Aschoff decided to host a mobile photography competition. The winners and runners-up were part of an exhibition that took place in Berlin on June 22 of the same year.

During the beta period, EyeEm was an iPhone-only app and was called EYE'EM, and had around 5,000 users from 79 countries. In early 2011, the founders began working on the idea full-time and launched the first version of the EyeEm app on Android and iOS in August 2011.

In March 2014, three months before it reported having more than 10 million users, it partnered with Getty Images to distribute photographs taken by EyeEm users. The following year, in March, it reached 13 million users and launched Market, its online marketplace where users can sell their own images.

In April 2015, the company raised $18M in Series B funding. The round was led by Valar Ventures and includes existing investors Earlybird Ventures, Passion Capital, Wellington Partners, Atlantic Labs and Open Ocean Capital. As part of the new round, Valar took a board seat at the company.

In June 2015, EyeEm launched the Discover Feed, a manually curated feed. In September, it launched EyeEm Vision (previously called EyeVision), a deep learning computer vision framework that attempts to identify and rank images by aesthetics and concept.

In January 2016, EyeEm announced a new partnership with Alamy as another distribution partner besides Getty. In May 2016, EyeEm launched The Roll, an iOS app that attempts to analyze images to rank them by quality.

At the Apple Worldwide Developers Conference (WWDC) in 2016, it was announced that The Roll would be one of the first apps to integrate with Siri. In July 2016, EyeEm reaches 18 million users and opened their Web Upload to all users.

On February 16, 2019, EyeEm announced that they got hacked and its database was put for sale on the Dream Market. The database consists of roughly 22 million records and included email addresses and passwords. The passwords were stored encrypted (hashed and salted) with the SHA-1 algorithm.

In April 2024, EyeEm changed its terms of use, requiring all users to grant a sublicensable right to their content for the purposes of training and improving "software, algorithms, and machine-learning models".

In late 2025, EyeEm announced that it will shut down permanently on January 13, 2026

== Technology ==
EyeEm's image recognition technology uses artificial intelligence to tag and rank images based on an aesthetic score assigned to each photo. When users upload a photo via the Web Upload tool, this technology is used to suggest keywords. The company applied this to an iOS app called The Roll, which launched in May 2016, and organizes the images on users' camera roll.

== Funding ==
EyeEm was incorporated in Berlin, Germany, in February 2011 by founders Florian Meissner, Lorenz Aschoff, Gen Sadakane, and Ramzi Rizk.

The company has raised $24 million to date in funding from Valar Ventures, Earlybird Venture Capital, Passion Capital, Wellington Partners, Atlantic Labs and OpenOcean. In 2018, it was revealed that the company raised an additional $10 million in an internal round from existing investors, with new investors Cipio Partners joining the round.

In June 2021, New Value AG, also known as Talenthouse, acquired EyeEm for close to $40 million USD.

== See also ==
- Image hosting service
- List of photo sharing websites
- List of social networking websites
- Photo sharing
- User-generated content
