= Kidrobot =

American art toy company

Kidrobot, Inc.
- Company type: Subsidiary
- Industry: Collectables, designer toys
- Founded: 2002; 24 years ago
- Headquarters: Broomfield, Colorado, United States
- Key people: Frank Kozik (Creative director)
- Parent: Wildbrain Entertainment (2006–2014); National Entertainment Collectibles Association (2014–present)
- Website: kidrobot.com

Kidrobot, Inc. is a producer and retailer of designer toys, vinyl art toys, and collectibles founded in 2002 by entrepreneur Paul Budnitz. The company was one of the earliest creators of designer art toys in America.

The company was acquired in November 2014 by National Entertainment Collectibles Association Inc. after almost going bankrupt. Frank Kozik joined the company as creative director that year.

== History ==
Entrepreneur Paul Budnitz saw vinyl art toys during a business trip to Asia in 2002 and decided to create a market for art toys in the United States. He started a website and began importing toys from Japan, and opened a brick and mortar store in San Francisco a few months later.

A few months later, the company began producing its own toy line with Tristan Eaton as the product designer. The company moved to New York City and opened a physical retail store in 2003. Stores were later opened in Los Angeles, Miami, London, Las Vegas, and Boulder.

The Dunny and Munny toys launched in April 2004 at Hong Kong ToyCon. Kidrobot commissioned new artists including Huck Gee, Dalek, David Horvath, Tara McPherson, Amanda Visell, and Nathan Jurevicius to make designs for the Dunny toy, while the Munny was sold as a blank item that the buyer could decorate. The toys were originally released in limited edition sets, and now come in editions of up to 50,000.

In 2006, Wildbrain Entertainment, creators of Higglytown Heroes and Yo Gabba Gabba!, purchased a stake in Kidrobot.

Budnitz moved the company headquarters to Boulder, Colorado in 2009 during the company's first down year.

In 2012, Budnitz left Kidrobot and WildBrain announced that they had purchased the brand in full.

In 2014, all Kidrobot stores except Las Vegas and San Francisco, which were independently operated, shut down. In November 2014, the company announced that it had been acquired by National Entertainment Collectibles Association and Frank Kozik had been appointed creative director.

== Products ==
Kidrobot produces various different designer toy figures, including Munny and Dunny, both of which were featured in the New York Times and other national newspapers and magazines. Kidrobot is also known for its toy series known as Yummy World.

In addition, it produces limited-edition Japanese anime figurines and collaborates with well-known television series, such as South Park and The Simpsons. In 2020, KidRobot partnered with the Metropolitan Museum of Art during the Met150 celebration for a series of Dunny collectibles inspired by iconic works by the museum's permanent collection.

=== Munny ===
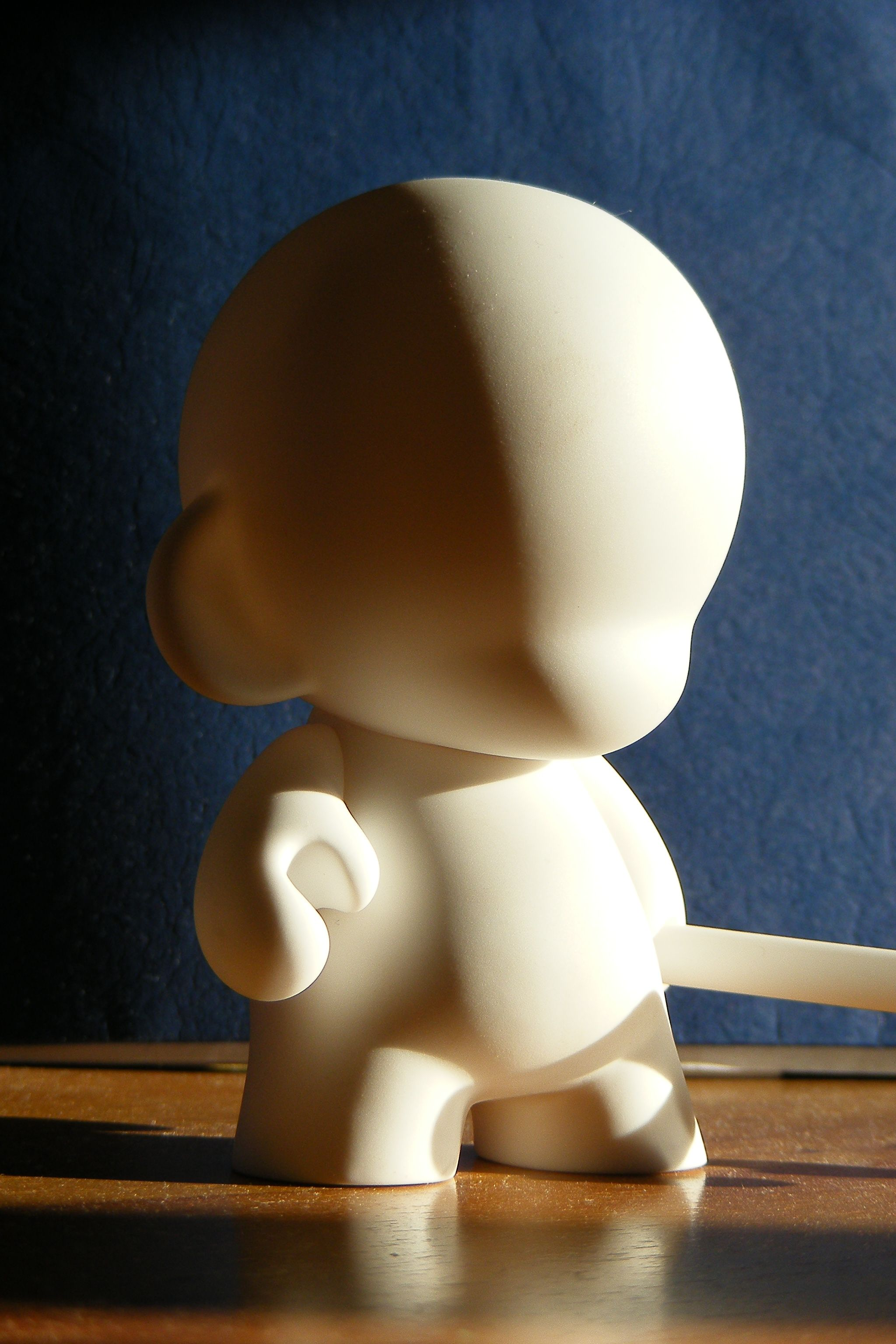
Blank Munny figurine

A Munny is a figure made out of vinyl with movable joints, designed to be a cross between a devil and a monkey.

The figures are blank and the owner can decorate them using pens, pencils, markers, paint, and other supplies; alternatively, some people commission artists to design Munnys for them, or artists design them to sell. The initial idea was undertaken by street artists who had come to bring back their work legally to the public to display their works.

The original Munny is white in color, stands 7 inches tall, and weighs about 1 pound. All series include the 7 inch Munny with the white Munny as the featured doll in the series.

Other variations of the doll are:

- Foomi - same shape as the original Munny, only smaller, and has spiky hair
- Rooz - A bear-like creature with no legs
- Raffy - A giraffe-like creature, the term "Raffy" comes from "giraffe"
- Bub - A hippopotamus Munny
- Trikky - A shorter Munny with cat ears
- Micro Munny - same shape as the original Munny, but stands 2 inches tall. These were released in October 2012 and come blind-packed along with Foomis, Raffys, and Trikkys. Colors include red, yellow, white, cyan, and blue.
- Mini Munny - same shape as the original Munny, but stands 4 inches tall, originally released in February 2008. It was released in blue, white and pink. The mini Munny comes packaged with one accessory, a "My Name Is" sticker, and a marker.
- Mega Munny - same shape as the original Munny, but stands 18 inches tall and weighs several pounds. Mega Munny is available in white, teal, pink, and yellow. Although Mega Munny does not include any accessories, Mega Munny includes a practice sheet and a coloring book.
- Mini Munny Mobile - A white model of a car which includes 1 white Mini Munny. Both the car and the Mini Munny are made from white vinyl. The car can seat one Mini Munny, has rolling wheels, and a dome-like windshield, along with 4 "mystery" accessories.

=== Dunny ===
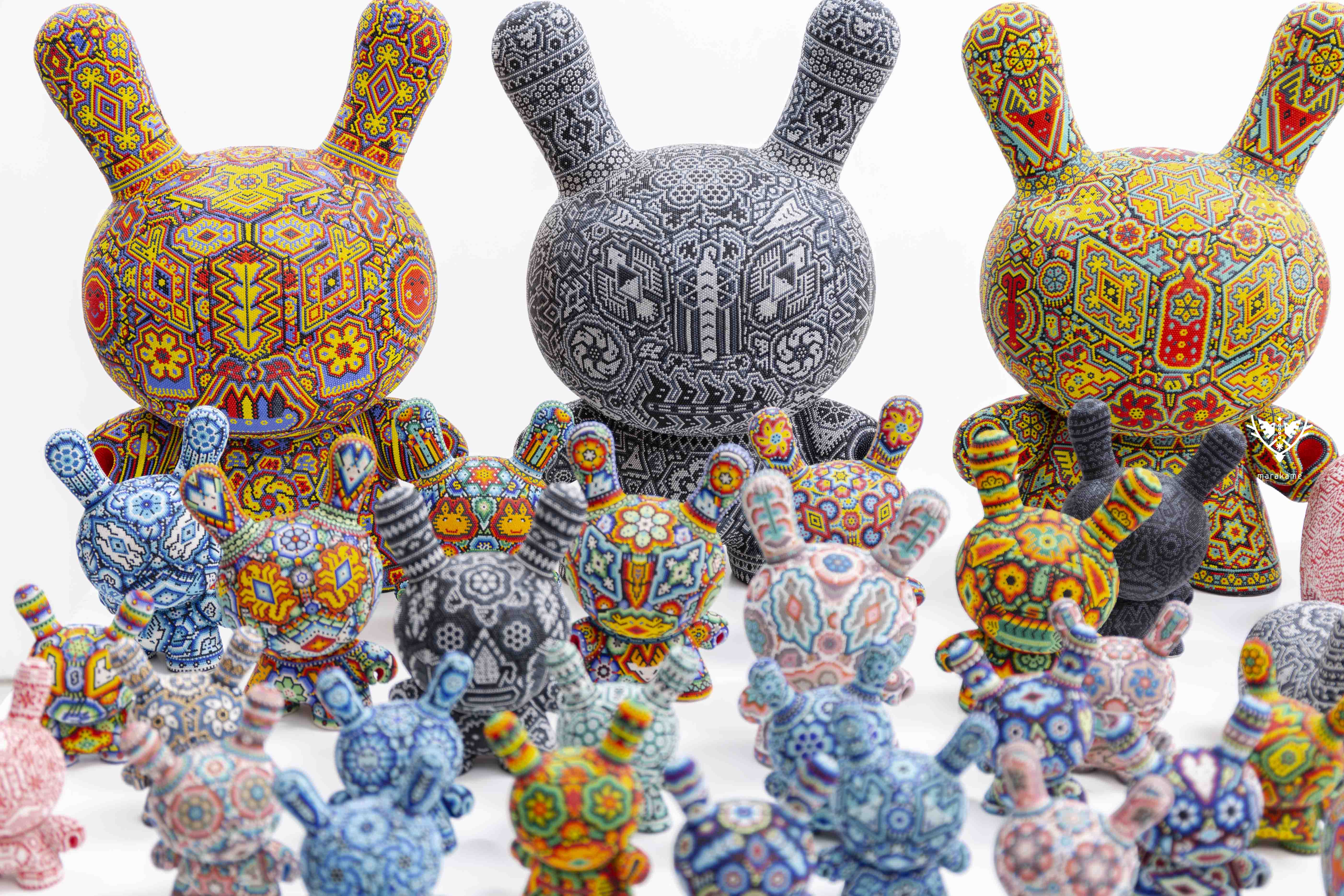
Dunnys covered with crystal beads by Arte Marakame.

Dunnys are similar to Munnys in that both are produced by Kidrobot and are vinyl figures, however Dunnys are a different shape, are only sold with designs already printed on them, and are produced in limited numbers.

Dunnys have rabbit-like ears at the top of their heads, unlike Munny which has two humanoid ears. Though they are sold already printed, artists can remove the factory-applied paint and apply their own designs, producing custom Dunnys. Dunnys are available in fewer locations than Munnys.

Dunnys are designed and released in 8" versions several times a year and typically two blind boxed series of 3" Dunny figures are released each year.

== Other media ==
In September 2008, there was a report that a film based on the toy merchandise was in development, though it was never produced.

== See also ==
- Art toys
- Funko
- Tokidoki
- Paul Budnitz
