= Paul Budnitz =

American entrepreneur (born 1967)

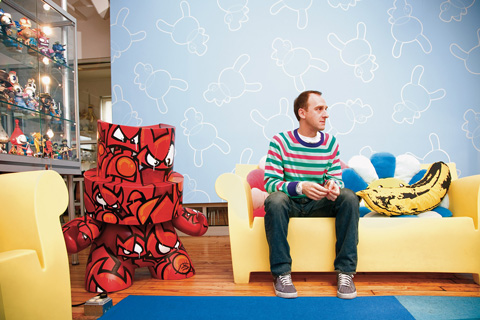
- Born: September 14, 1967 (age 58); Berkeley, California, United States
- Education: Berkeley High School
- Occupation(s): Founder of Kidrobot and Ello; Owner of Budnitz Bicycles; Founder of Superplastic.co
- Spouse: Sabine "Sa" Budnitz

Paul Budnitz (born September 14, 1967) is an American entrepreneur. He is the founder of global entertainment brand Superplastic, retailer Kidrobot and social network Ello. He also owns Budnitz Bicycles in Burlington, Vermont.

== Early life and education ==
Paul Budnitz grew up in Berkeley, California. His father was a nuclear physicist, and his mother was a social worker. He graduated from Berkeley High School and eventually transferred to Yale University in Connecticut.

== Career ==
Budnitz is also a film director, and in 1996 he directed the film 93 Million Miles from the Sun. In 2001, he directed Ultraviolet, a 13-minute short film.

Budnitz is the founder of Kidrobot, Ello, Budnitz Bicycles, and Superplastic. Superplastic is known for creating synthetic celebrities who appear in social media, music, gaming, high-end collectibles, fashion, animated entertainment, web3 and live experiences. The company sells real and virtual products, and has collaborated with Gucci, Fortnite, Mercedes-Benz, Tommy Hilfiger, Christie's, J. Balvin, Paris Hilton, and Vince Staples.

== Personal life ==
Budnitz has lived in Boulder, Colorado; New York City; Montana; and Shelburne, Vermont. He is married to Sabine "Sa Budnitz" and the couple split their time between Vermont and New York City.
