= Lakireddy Bali Reddy =

American criminal, landlord and investor (1937–2021)

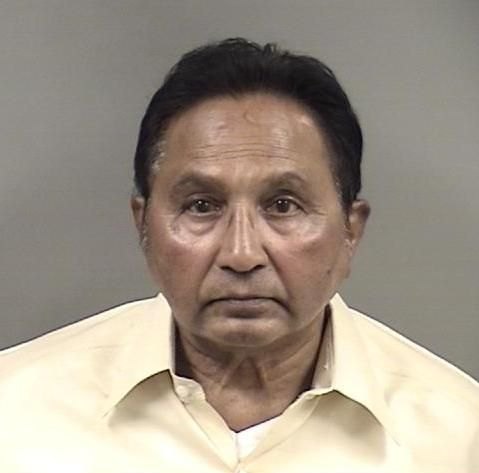
- Born: 1937; Velvadam, Madras Presidency, British India (now in Andhra Pradesh, India)
- Died: November 8, 2021 (aged 84)
- Occupations: landlord, investor
- Convictions: Immigration fraud, transportation of minors for illegal sexual activity
- Penalty: 97 months in jail, US$2 million in restitution

Lakireddy Bali Reddy (1937 – November 8, 2021) was an Indian and American landlord, convicted felon, and chairman of the Lakireddy Balireddy College of Engineering in Andhra Pradesh. Reddy exploited the Indian caste system to bring young Indian women and girls to Berkeley, California. From 1986 to 1999, he and his family members and associates forced them into servitude and sexual slavery.

Reddy came to the United States in 1960 to study engineering at the University of California, Berkeley. By 1975, Reddy had opened a successful Indian cuisine restaurant in downtown Berkeley. He used its profits to purchase over 1,000 run-down apartments, making him, by the year 2000, the largest and wealthiest landlord in the city (other than the University of California), with a worth estimated at US$69 million.

In 2000, Reddy was indicted by the United States Attorney for the Northern District of California who charged him with sex trafficking, visa fraud, and tax code violations following a lengthy investigation by the Immigration and Naturalization Service, the Federal Bureau of Investigation, the Internal Revenue Service, the Department of Labor, and the Berkeley Police Department.

On June 21, 2001, the United States Attorney for the Northern District of California announced that Reddy pled guilty to one count of conspiring to commit immigration fraud, two counts of transportation of minors for illegal sexual activity, and one count of subscribing to a false tax return for which he was fined US$2 million (~$3.37 million in 2024) and sentenced to serve a prison term of 97 months in the custody of the Federal Bureau of Prisons.

Reddy's case ultimately served as the building block for California's anti-trafficking movement.

== Early life and education ==
Reddy was born in 1937 in the village of Velvadam in the Krishna district of Andhra Pradesh. India At age 17, he married a 14-year-old girl. Married three times, Reddy had three sons, Raj, Vijay and Prasad Lakireddy. Raj died in a motorcycle crash while attending Chennai Medical college in 1985.

Reddy completed his BSc and BTech from Osmania University in Hyderabad. In 1960, he went to the University of California, Berkeley on a scholarship, graduating with a MEng in chemical engineering.

== Business and trafficking ==
In 1975, Reddy opened the Pasand Madras Indian Cuisine restaurant in downtown Berkeley. Over the years, he used its profits to acquire more than 1,000 run-down apartment buildings. By 2000, he had used its profits to become the second largest property owner in the city, second only to the University of California. By 2000, he owned real estate assets valued at US$69 million and had income of US$1 million per month from his 1,000 rental properties.

Reddy also owned a construction company with his brother Hanimireddy Lakireddy (a Yale University-trained cardiologist) that was located near his restaurant in Berkeley. He opened a second Pasand Indian Cuisine Restaurant in Santa Clara and owned nightclubs in Berkeley and San Francisco.

Reddy used his money to improve his home community of Velvadam, where he built two elementary schools and a high school, created sources of clean drinking water, and paid for a new wing at the local hospital. Because of Reddy's many capital expenditures, Velvadam became known as a "mini-U.S.A." Some villagers adored him for his power and spending.

The majority of the villagers in Velvadam were of the Dalit ("untouchable") caste. Beginning in 1986, Reddy used his status to convince them that he could better their lives by bringing them to America. Reddy brought as many as 99 people, mostly women and girls, to the United States. In many cases, he used fraudulent visas, sham marriages, and fake identities.

Anita Chabria, a California-based journalist, wrote, "Reddy ruled over his victims like a feudal lord, imposing his law rather than U.S. law by keeping his targets isolated and afraid — of him, and of their tenuous position as illegal immigrants — and by importing the rules of the caste system, an apartheid that India has fought to eradicate but that still governs the daily lives of many Hindus".

== Initial investigation ==
On November 24, 1999, Marcia Poole, a longtime Berkeley resident, while driving on a side street in Berkeley, became suspicious when she saw four Indian men moving what she first thought was a rolled-up rug out of a Reddy-owned apartment building and putting it into a Reddy Realty van. Upon looking more closely at the rug being carried, she noticed a leg sticking out of it.

Poole noticed, in the crowd of bystanders, a distraught young Indian girl, later identified as 18-year-old Laxmi Patati. When the men tried to drag that girl into the van too, who was "resisting with all her might," Poole stopped them and was able to get a passing driver to call the police. Police found the body of 13-year-old Sitha Vemireddy (later identified as one of the victims Reddy treated as concubines) in the apartment building's stairwell. Her sister, Lalitha, was alive but disoriented in the van.

Police investigators, who did not know what had happened when they arrived on the scene, asked Reddy to interpret for them, which Lt. Cynthia Harris, chief of detectives and public information officer for the Berkeley Police Department, later admitted was a mistake.

Reddy told the police that Patati was the roommate of sisters Sitha and Lalitha and had discovered them both unconscious when she returned to their shared apartment. Police accepted Reddy's story, and the coroner ruled the death of Sitha to be accidental carbon monoxide poisoning caused by a blocked heating vent, and the investigation was closed.

Less than a month later, in December 1999, the Berkeley Police received an anonymous letter saying that Reddy had lied to them which caused a new investigation to be opened into Sitha's death, but, by that time, her body had been cremated on Reddy's orders.

The Berkeley Police then joined with the INS in a larger investigation of Reddy that was joined by the FBI and the DOJ.

== Investigation and arrest ==
Following the November 24, 1999 death of 13-year-old Sitha Vemireddy and the December 1999 anonymous letter they had received about her death, the Berkeley Police Department opened a new investigation into Reddy teaming with the INS and re-interviewing her roommates Lalitha and Patati, and the man who Reddy said was their father, Venkateswara Vemireddy.

Using their own interpreters for this new investigation, the Berkeley Police and INS caused Reddy associates Venkateswara Vemireddy and his sister, Padma, to confess that he was not Sitha's father. Vemireddy told these authorities that Reddy had obtained fraudulent visas for him and these minor girls and had loaned him US$6,500.00. Vemireddy then falsely stated that both Sitha and Lalitha were his daughters.

Lalitha and Patati had been detained in an INS facility but were released with the help of the American Civil Liberties Union and private lawyers. They told investigators that Reddy had raped and beat them and forced them to work for almost no pay.

Patati also told authorities that her father had sold her to Reddy when she was 12, that Patati was not her real name, and that she had also worked as a servant on Reddy's estate in Velvadam and been abused by him there as well.

Patati also said that she was at the San Francisco airport when Padma Vemireddy arrived with Sitha and Lalitha posing as her daughters. Reddy and Patati (who had previously been smuggled into Berkeley) picked up the girls and took them to the Berkeley apartment where Patati lived. Patati told investigators that she had witnessed Reddy raping both Sitha and Lalitha. Reddy continued to rape them and force them to perform labor for little or no pay.

In January 2000, police arrested Reddy.

The original nine-count U.S. federal indictment charged Reddy with conspiracy to commit immigration fraud, transportation of minors for illegal sexual activity, and false statements on a tax return.

Widespread outrage in California erupted immediately upon Reddy's arrest, but when Western media outlets went to the village of Velvadam, they found some villagers praising him with banners.

== Plea bargain and conviction ==
The original charges carried a potential sentence of up to 38 years in prison.

Authorities faced complications during the investigation. Many of Reddy's victims refused to testify against him due to fear. However, there was a plea agreement in which Reddy would be sentenced to 97 months (8 years, 1 month) in prison and ordered to pay $2 million in restitution, an agreement that also prohibits appeals. He was convicted of "one count of conspiracy to commit immigration fraud, two counts of transporting a minor in foreign commerce for illegal sexual activity, and one count of subscribing to a false tax return".

In Reddy's new plea agreement, he admitted that, between 1986 and January 2000, he illegally brought Indian nationals into the United States using fraudulent visas and admitted that he made arrangements to have Venkateswara Vemireddy enter the United States on a fraudulent visa and to bring his sister posing as his wife.

Reddy also admitted bringing two minor girls into the United States as their daughters, stating that he intended to have sexual intercourse with both victims, who were younger than 16 years old. Another victim girl was reported to be 13 years of age in 1991 when she was brought into the United States with false documents. Reddy said he intended to have sexual intercourse with her too.

Prosecutors later found that one of their interpreters, Uma Rao, had asked the victims to exaggerate the crimes. After discovering this, they disclosed this information to the defense. Legal sources speculated that the actions of the interpreter might result in a new trial.

== Post-prison life ==
Reddy was released from prison in 2008. He moved into a mansion that had been custom-built for him while he was imprisoned. Upon his release from prison, Reddy was registered as a California sex offender under the state's Megan's Law.

In 2019, The Daily Californian observed that "As of 2013, [Lakireddy Baly Reddy] still owned Everest Properties, and as of 2017 members of his family owned Raj Properties. Everest alone advertises more than 100 properties available in Berkeley and surrounding areas on its website, which means Reddy collects millions of dollars of rent every year."

Reddy died on November 8, 2021, at the age of 84.

== Reporting ==
Lakireddy Bali Reddy was the subject of the book Slaves of Berkeley: The Shocking Story of Human Trafficking in the United States by Tim Huddleston. According to Huddleston:

"Lakireddy Bali Reddy was a noted successful businessman; he owned restaurants and real estate all over Northern California and made over $1,000,000 a month from his income properties. He also had a dirty little secret to his success ... he forced Indian girls into slavery. All was going well for Lakireddy until a carbon monoxide leak led to the death of one of his underaged slaves. Surprisingly, it wasn't a police investigation that led to his arrest, but a story in a school newspaper. This is the story of the human trafficking ring that shook a nation and opened the door for reform in the United States."

— Slaves of Berkeley: The Shocking Story of Human Trafficking in the United States

Reddy's crimes have also been cited in the books Hidden Slaves: Forced Labor in the United States, Body Evidence: Intimate Violence against South Asian Women in America, Shout Out: Women of Color Respond to Violence, New Slavery: A Reference Handbook, Not for Sale: The Return of the Global Slave Trade—and How We Can Fight It, and Multicultural Jurisprudence: Comparative Perspectives on the Cultural Defense.

His case reportedly inspired changes to California's human trafficking laws in 2005 and was part of Congressional testimony on the proposed Save America Comprehensive Immigration Act of 2007, as well as the report of the California Alliance to Combat Trafficking and Slavery Task Force.

== See also ==
- Human trafficking in California
