= Bruce Ryan (production designer) =

American production designer and art director

Bruce Ryan (born 1953) is an Emmy Award-nominated American production designer and art director. He has worked on more than 800 different television and motion picture productions.

== Career ==
Ryan's early career included working on the series Fridays, ABC's version of Saturday Night Live. After 57 live productions, he designed American Bandstand's 40th Anniversary Special for which he received his first Emmy nomination. Ten years later he designed the dance show, Soul Train. This was followed sitcoms such as It's Garry Shandling's Show, Will & Grace and All of Us; music specials for Whitney Houston, Celine Dion, Aretha Franklin and Cher; and award shows such as the Emmys, the MTV Video Music Awards, the Billboard Awards, the Nickelodeon Kids' Choice Awards, the Soul Train Music Awards, Hollywood Squares, Candid Camera's 50th Anniversary and the AFI Life Achievement Award.

Ryan designed several arena-sized stand-up comedy events, Larry the Cable Guy at University of Nebraska for an audience of 100,000, Kevin Hart at Lincoln Stadium for 53,000 and Gabriel Iglesias at Dodger Stadium for 46,000. Ryan has collaborated with leading stand-ups multiple times including Patton Oswalt, Ellen DeGeneres, Chris Rock, Drew Carey, George Carlin, Dave Chappelle, Bill Maher, as well as arena standups Jeff Dunham, Gabriel Iglesias, Kevin Hart, and Cedric the Entertainer. Ryan also designed Jon Lovitz's Comedy Club at Universal CityWalk.

== Awards ==
Ryan has been nominated for 2 Primetime Emmys, 1 Daytime Emmy, 5 Art Directors Guild Awards, and won 3 out of 4 CableACE Award nominations. Ryan's Broadway show Def Poetry Jam won the Tony Award for Best Theatrical Event of 2003.
