= Berkeley High School (California) =

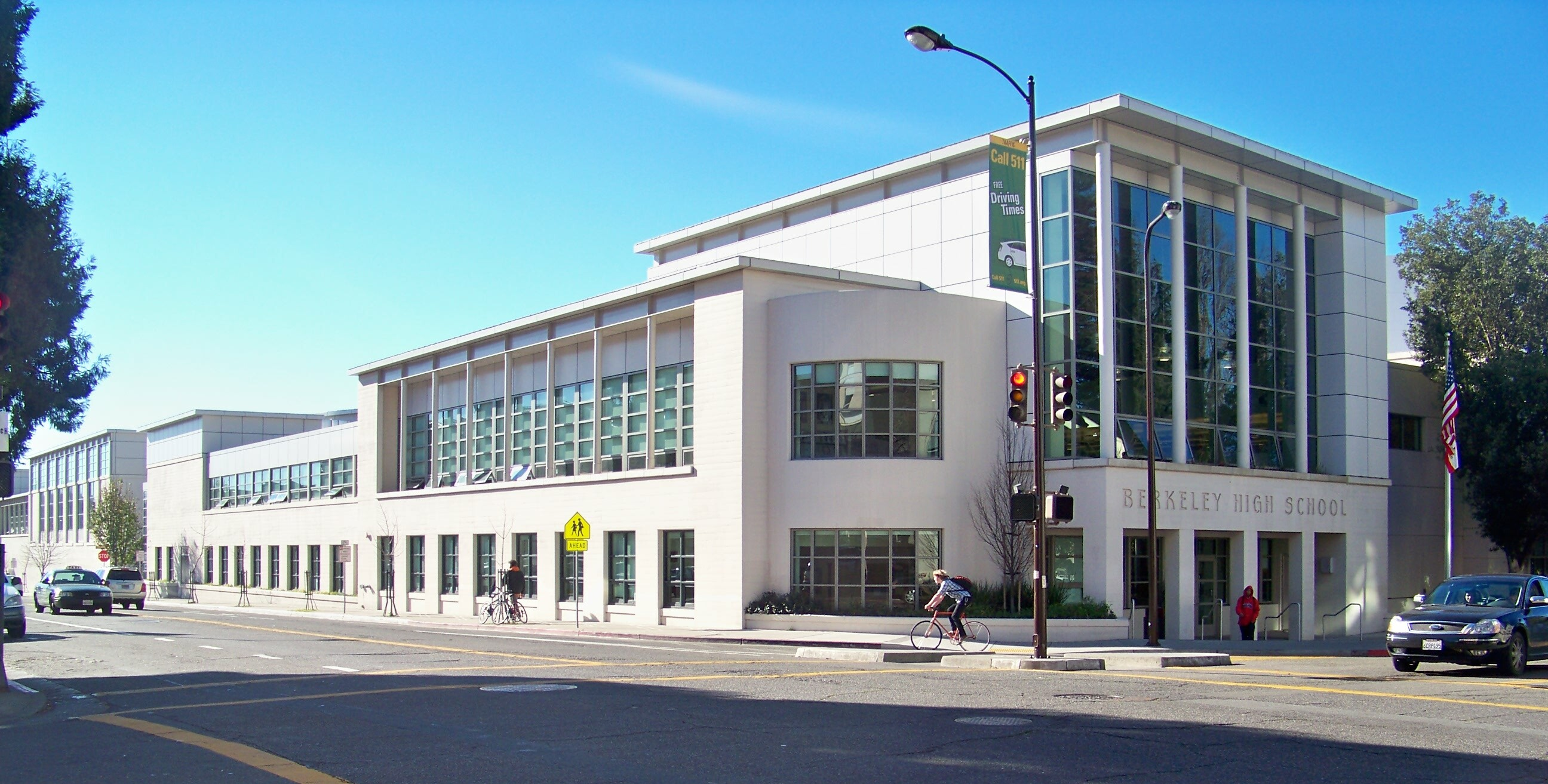

Location
- 1980 Allston Way; Berkeley, California 94704; United States; 37°52′04″N 122°16′17″W

Information
- School type: Public high school
- Established: 1880
- School district: Berkeley Unified School District
- NCES District ID: 0604740
- NCES School ID: 060474000432
- Principal: Juan Raygoza
- Teaching staff: 172.39 (FTE)
- Grades: 9-12
- Enrollment: 3,220 (2023–2024)
- Student to teacher ratio: 18.68
- Hours in school day: 7
- Campus type: Urban
- Colors: Red and gold
- Athletics conference: West Alameda County (WAC)
- Nickname: Yellowjackets
- Rival: Bishop O'Dowd High School
- Accreditation: Western Association of Schools and Colleges (WASC)
- Newspaper: Berkeley High Jacket
- Yearbook: Olla Podrida
- Feeder schools: King Middle School; Willard Middle School; Longfellow Middle School
- Website: Berkeley High School

Berkeley High School is a public high school in the Berkeley Unified School District, and the only public high school in the city of Berkeley, California, United States. It is located one long block west of Shattuck Avenue and three short blocks south of University Avenue in Downtown Berkeley. The school mascot is the Yellowjacket.

Some of the campus buildings are recognized as a Berkeley Landmark by the city; and since January 7, 2008, eight of the campus buildings were designated a historic district by the National Register of Historic Places under the name, the Berkeley High School Campus Historic District.

== History ==
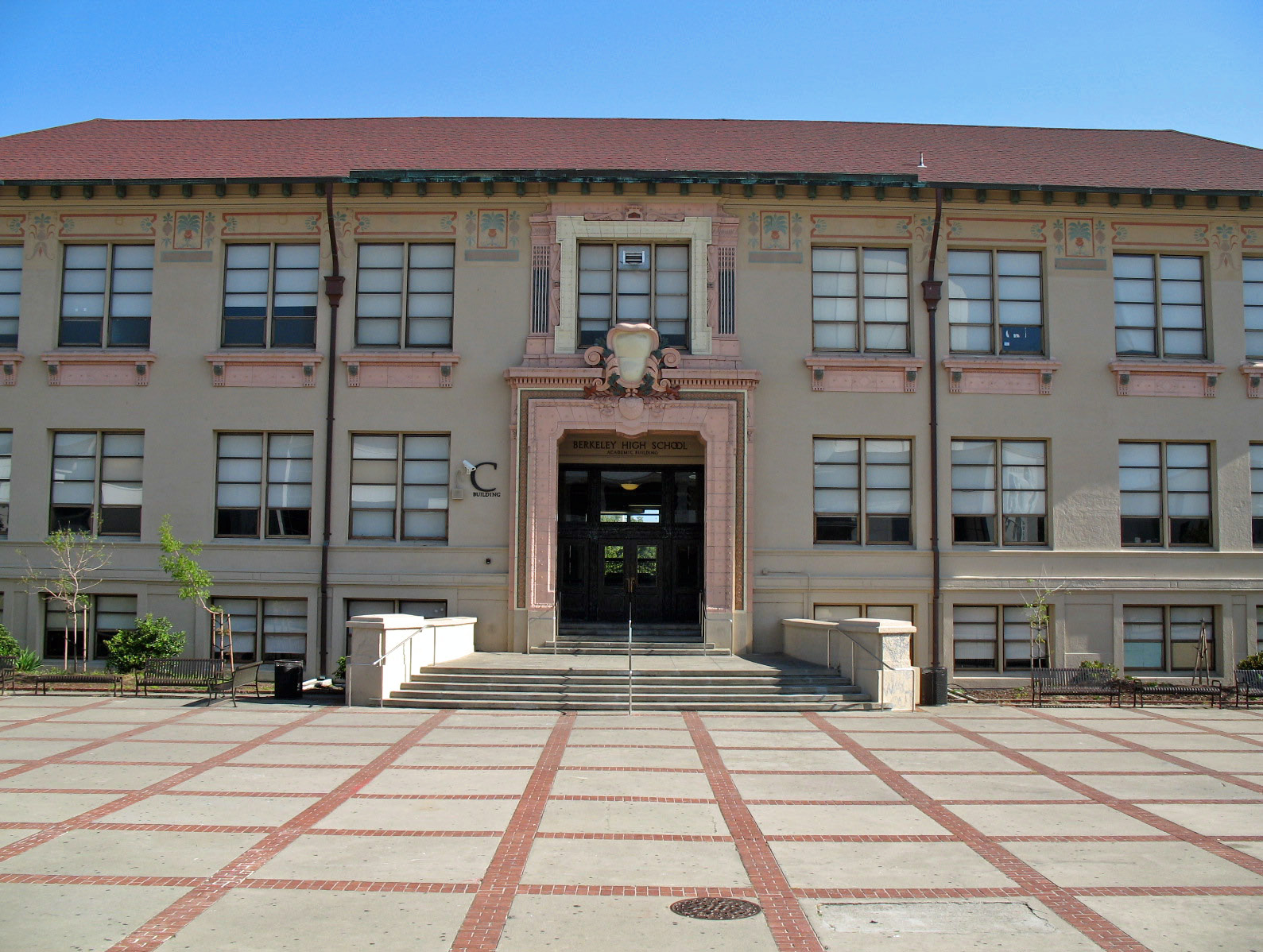
Old Berkeley High School

Berkeley High School, rear view of building showing toppled chimneys after the 1906 San Francisco earthquake

The first public high school classes in Berkeley were held at the Kellogg Primary School located at Oxford and Center streets adjacent to the campus of the University of California. It opened in 1880 and the first high school graduation occurred in 1884. In 1895, the first high school annual was published, entitled the Crimson and Gold (changed to Olla Podrida by 1899).

In 1900, the citizens of Berkeley voted in favor of a bond measure to establish the first dedicated public high school campus in the city. In 1901, construction began on the northwest portion of the present site of the high school. The main school building stood on the corner of Grove (now Martin Luther King Way) and Allston Way, where the "H" building is located today. At that time, Kittredge Street ran through what is today's campus site instead of ending at Milvia. The local office of the Bay Cities Telephone Company sat on the site of today's administration building at the corner of Allston Way and Milvia by 1911.

Berkeley High School circa 1915

On Arbor Day of 1902, noted naturalist John Muir joined Berkeley's mayor William H. Marston in planting a giant sequoia in a yard south of the new high school buildings. The tree is apparently no longer there, pending results from a future investigation.

The main building of the high school suffered moderate damage in the form of toppled chimneys, broken windows, and some weakened walls as a result of the 1906 San Francisco earthquake. Professor Andrew Lawson of the University of California included one of his photographs (shown at left) of the damage in his famous report issued in 1908. The building was subsequently repaired and re-opened. In 1934, it was demolished and soon thereafter replaced by the buildings that stand there now, the "H" and "G" buildings.

In 1955, Berkeley High School band director Bob Lutt (who eventually was made executive director of the Berkeley Symphony Orchestra) founded Cazadero Performing Arts Camp.

In 1964, the West Campus of Berkeley High School was opened in the buildings of the former Burbank Junior High School at Bonar Street and University Avenue. It served all ninth graders, while the main campus served grades 10–12, except for an interval from the mid-1970s to the early 1980s when it was 7–9 to accommodate construction at Willard Junior High School. It was turned over to the Berkeley Adult School in 1986, which used it until 2004. West Campus is currently closed, but the main building is being used as the administrative offices of the Berkeley Unified School District.

Several famous performers have played at the Berkeley Community Theater on the Berkeley High campus. On May 23, 1952, Paul Robeson sang, despite a small McCarthy-era furor. In 1957, Stan Getz was one of the featured performers of the Berkeley Jazz Festival.

A significant portion of students and faculty alike were involved with the various forms of political activism that characterized the sixties in Berkeley, including protests against the Vietnam War, advocacy for civil rights and third world studies, and supporting People's Park. The campus included a Black Students Union, Chicano Student Union, and Asian Student Union (formerly called the Oriental Student Union). In 1971, Berkeley High students elected a homosexual male African American student as Homecoming Queen.

Berkeley High School has been innovative in its high school curriculum. In the fall of 1970, a "school within a school" opened at Berkeley High called Community High School. It was "alternative", in keeping with the sixties culture which permeated life in Berkeley at the time. By 1974, there were several small schools within Berkeley High: Genesis-Agora (formerly Community and Community 2), Model School A, School of the Arts, and College Prep. Berkeley High School was also the first public high school in the United States with an African American Studies department, established in 1969.

The campus was designated a historic district, the Berkeley High School Campus Historic District, by the National Register of Historic Places on January 7, 2008.

== Administration and organization ==
=== Demographics ===
Berkeley High demographics, as of the 2017–2018 school year, out of 3,118 enrolled students:

- 463 (15%) African American or Black
- 7 (0.2%) American Indian or Alaska Native
- 251 (8%) Asian
- 22 (0.7%) Filipino
- 731 (23%) Hispanic or Latino
- 11 (0.3%) Pacific Islander or Native Hawaiian
- 1,258 (40%) White, non-Hispanic
- 375 (12%) identifying as two or more races
- 949 (30%) received free/reduced meals, English learners or foster youth
- 884 (28%) received free and reduced-price meals
- 177 (6%) English learners
- 652 (21%) fluent English proficient

=== Achievement gap ===
The achievement gap refers to the academic disparity between certain groups, including African-Americans, Latinos, students whose first language is not English, and students living in poverty, who perform significantly below others. This gap extends beyond the results of standardized test scores and also applies to the disparity between certain groups regarding dropout rates, participation in honors classes and Advanced Placement (AP) exams, and numbers of students admitted to colleges. Due to Berkeley High School's racially, ethnically and socio-economically diverse student population, it has been called the "most integrated high school in America." However an achievement gap continues to exist between the white students and black and Latino students. For example, for the 2017–18 school year, the percentage of white students who graduated with the requirements for the UC application fulfilled was 86%, compared to 40% of black students and 50% of Latino students. In 2015, the graduation rate for English learners was 68%--much lower than any other group. Beyond academics and looking at student performance and behavior, "white and Hispanic students are suspended less frequently than African-American students," and black students are much more frequently expelled, drop out, are absent, and/or are enrolled in remedial classes and special education. Regarding post-graduation, "many white and Asian students graduate with honors and attend elite colleges and universities, while few blacks and Latino students follow a similar path."

=== Small schools ===
In 2000, in an attempt to better serve its diverse community and close the achievement gap between white students and students of color, BHS began experimenting with the idea of small schools. In 2005, Berkeley High School officially established four small schools and a comprehensive program, Academic Choice.

The small schools that began the 2005-06 school with 240 students were:

- The Arts and Humanities Academy (AHA)
- Communication Arts and Sciences (CAS)
- Academy of Medicine and Public Service (AMPS)

In addition to the smaller schools, there are two Comprehensive Learning Communities, which compose nearly two-thirds of the student body, between 1000 and 1300 students. Academic Choice (AC) and Berkeley International High School (BIHS) - part of the International Baccalaureate (IB) program as of 2007 - make up this Comprehensive Learning Community.

- Academic Choice (AC)
- Berkeley International High School (BIHS)

Before the Fall 2018 school year, upon enrolling at Berkeley High School, incoming freshmen immediately chose to join one of the five learning communities that vary in size, academic emphasis, and offerings. Taking into account these preferences as well as a student's zip code, a lottery system determined the student's placement in one of the small schools. However, after several years, it was clear that the learning communities model had made little progress in closing the academic achievement gap between students at BHS. A demographic breakdown of small schools from the Western Association of Schools and Colleges (WASC) Report from 2011 to 2012 reported that within AC was 12% Latino students, 19% African American students, and 41% white, and within IB was 11% Latino, 29% African American and 47% white; while within AMPS was 24% Latino, 51% African American and 9% white. Moreover, Green Academy (now discontinued) and AMPS were the learning communities with the most students who scored not proficient in Math and English California Standards Test (CST) scores.

==== Demographics and Math/English proficiency rates by learning community ====
The following demographic data was disaggregated by the learning community by the BUSD WASC Self-Study of 2011–2012. Note that Green Academy and Life Academy have been discontinued.

BHS Demographics 2010-2011

Small school	Native/Asian/Pacific	Latino	African American	White	Multi	Unknown	Total
Academic Choice (AC)	13%	12%	19%	41%	11%	4%	1336
Arts and Humanities Academy (AHA)	8%	14%	30%	36%	10%	1%	236
Berkeley International High School (BIHS)	9%	11%	20%	47%	11%	2%	918
Communications Arts & Sciences (CAS)	5%	19%	34%	27%	13%	1%	231
Medicine and Public Service (AMPS)	6%	24%	51%	9%	7%	3%	238
Green Academy (discontinued)	10%	12%	44%	20%	11%	3%	261
Life Academy (discontinued)	0%	14%	62%	5%	19%	0%	21
All of BHS	10%	13%	26%	37%	11%	3%	3241
Independent Study Program	9%	9%	33%	38%		11%	159

The following California Standards Test (CST) data was disaggregated by the learning community by the BUSD Department of Evaluation and compares the proficiency rates of Berkeley High School's six learning communities. Note that Green Academy has been discontinued.

Percent of students "proficient or above" in Math and English California Standards Test (CST) scores

Small school	Enrollment 2011	English 2007	English 2011	Math 2007	Math 2011
Academic Choice (AC)	1,300	67%	57%	36%	30%
Berkeley International High School (BIHS)	900	64%	69%	39%	33%
Arts and Humanities (AHA)	240	40%	47%	12%	7%
Communication Arts & Sciences (CAS)	240	42%	31%	5%	6%
Medicine & Public Service (AMPS)	240	28%	22%	4%	2%
Green Academy (now discontinued)	280	36%	30%	7%	6%
Berkeley High School average	3,200	51%	52%	24%	23%
California state average		41%	49%	21%	28%

=== Possible achievement gap explanations ===
A policy exists surrounding students who wish to be placed in IB or AC (the most rigorous of the small schools) that guarantees them a spot in one of those small schools if they don't list any other choices. "The majority of white students and Asian students who come into school don't choose the small learning communities; they only choose IB or AC" and this policy hasn't been removed because parents have fought against students having to be placed in a small learning community if they did not want them to. Segregation among students is another possible explanation for the persistence of the achievement gap. A BHS teacher said that "freshmen often will decide their learning community based on stereotypes within the school." "Much of the segregation occurs during the nonstructural part of the school day: before and after school, during lunch and between classes." Segregation inside schools is directly influenced by segregation outside of school, and in Berkeley, white students are more reported to be from middle and upper-middle-class families living in the Berkeley hills while minority students are more reported to become from lower-income families in the more flatland neighborhoods.

=== Universal 9th grade ===
In 2015, administrators began discussions about reorganizing the high school. The Berkeley Redesign Project involved teachers, staff, students and parents. The first major change was to switch to a "universal 9th grade," in which freshmen will be placed in core groups of 120 students, with the choice of learning community beginning in tenth grade. This is intended to counter the occurrence of freshmen choosing their learning community based on stereotypes within the school and allow them to learn what the communities are like first-hand before they decide which one to join by creating a "randomized and intentionally heterogeneous collection of students who would share a core group of teachers" that monitor the students and make sure none slip through the cracks. Originally slated to start in the fall of 2017, the program began in the fall of 2018. These core groups, called hives, are composed of about 120 students who share four teachers in their core subject areas: Math 1 (or Advanced Math 1), Physics 1, English, and Ethnic Studies/Social Living. Students also get to choose two electives. "At the end of ninth grade, students then have the opportunity to rank one of the five learning communities at Berkeley High School for their 10th-12th grade education." After the BHS lottery process and upon being placed into a learning community, students are required to fulfill each learning community's unique academic requirements and are able to choose additional courses from individual departments, like African American Studies, Math, Performing and Visual Arts, Physical Education, Science and World Language. If students prefer a more flexible and individualized education, they have the option of Berkeley Independent Study (BIS) as an alternative to the traditional classroom environment.

=== Potential future changes ===
More ideas addressing the achievement gap include implementing an additional period strictly for advising to provide not just academic support and guidance with course selection but social and emotional support as well—especially about post-graduation plans. One worry, however, is the fact that because academic disparities among racial and socioeconomic groups are established in elementary and middle school, these programs aimed at closing the achievement gap at BHS won't make that much of a difference. The argument is then made for elementary and middle schools to make similar efforts to reduce those disparities early on. In addition, the development of interactive feedback loops would give districts the potential to continuously measure effectiveness and then implement alterations or modifications to their programs. A 5-year reform by the Bay Area School Reform Collaborative (BASRC) stresses the importance of adequate professional development for teachers to ensure they are fully prepared to implement school-wide programs for positive change, including teachers being treated as active learners through trainings and workshops and being empowered as professionals by each other and teacher educators.

=== Independent ratings ===
Berkeley High School has been rated by several independent organizations. It currently receives a rating of 8/10 by GreatSchools, which utilizes test scores, college readiness, course offering, equity, and discipline data to evaluate schools. It receives a grade of A+ by Niche, which utilizes public data and user reviews.

=== Departments, parent and student organizations ===
- African American Studies Department
- Academic Choice Advisory Council
- Athletics: basketball, badminton, crew, cross country, football, women's lacrosse, men's lacrosse, track and field
- BHS Athletic Fund, association football
- Computer Technology
- Danny Go! Club
- Mock Trial
- Robotics
- ESL/ELL
- English and World Language
- History
- JSA
- Mathematics
- Journalism, which produces the locally prominent school newspaper, the Berkeley High Jacket
- Physical Education
- PTSA
- Science
- Special Education
- Visual and Performing Arts: Jazz Ensemble
- Youth & Government

== Campus and architecture ==
The Berkeley High School campus covers four city blocks between Milvia Street and Martin Luther King Jr. Way and Allston and Channing Ways. The first cornerstone was laid in 1901, and the complex has been under almost continuous construction ever since, except for a decade around World War II. In the late 1930s, Berkeley High was remodeled, and old buildings were replaced with newer ones. The Florence Schwimley Little Theater, the Berkeley Community Theatre, and the G and H buildings are prime examples of the Streamline Moderne style designed by architects Henry H. Gutterson and William G. Corlett. The rebuilding was financed largely through Franklin Roosevelt's New Deal program, the WPA. They are embellished with sculptural reliefs by Robert Boardman Howard, Jacques Schnier and Lulu Hawkins Braghetta.

== In popular culture ==
Berkeley was the subject of "School Colors", an episode of PBS's Frontline about racial politics at Berkeley High School. The documentary was filmed throughout the 1993–1994 school year and aired on October 18, 1994.

In the 2011 Isabel Allende novel El Cuaderno de Maya, the title character Maya Vidal attended Berkeley High.

Nancy Rubin, who taught the class "Social Living" at Berkeley High for several decades, published a 1994 book titled Ask Me If I Care: Voices from an American High School which addresses teen social issues and is compiled from journal entries by anonymous Berkeley High School students written during their Social Living classes. She and her class were the subject of episode 2 season 1 of the documentary series "Hi I'm ___" released December 2021.

Berkeley High School students in 2001 compiled and published a dictionary of youth slang.

The 2020 episode of Reply All titled "Candidate One" was about the school body president elections for the 2019 school year.
