= Heather (given name) =

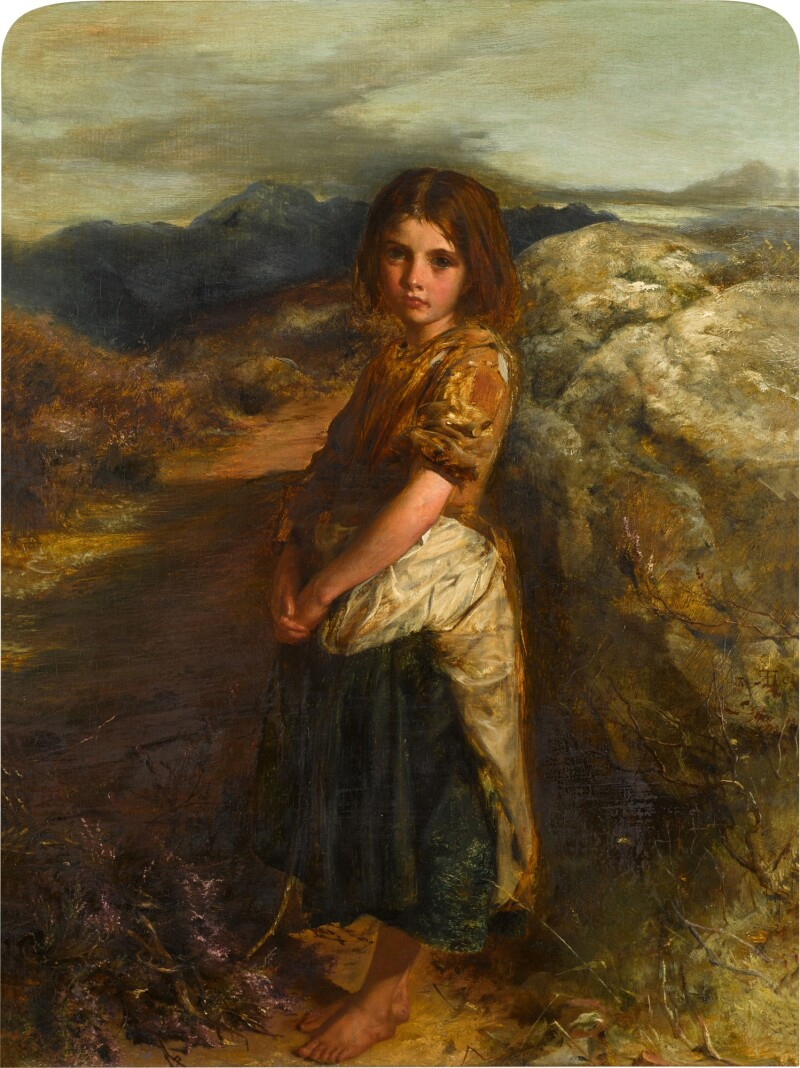
- Heather from the Hills, Arran, by Robert Herdman, 1864.
- Pronunciation: /ˈhɛðər/
- Gender: Female

Origin
- Origin: English derived from Middle English, hather
- Meaning: Named after the plant Heather, which are a variety of small shrubs with pink or white flowers which commonly grow in rocky areas
- Region of origin: Scotland

Other names
- Related names: Heath (Masculine form)

Heather is an English primarily feminine given name. The botanical name refers to a variety of small shrubs with pink or white flowers which commonly grow in rocky areas. The brush is native to Scotland and England, but it is more commonly found in Scotland due to its rocky territories. The name is derived from Middle English hather. The spelling was altered in the 18th century due to associations with the English word heath, denoting a location where the plant heather often grows.

Heath is often regarded as a masculine form of the name. Heath has also occasionally been used as a girl's name in the United States.

Heather is also a surname.

== Usage ==
Heather has been in use as a name for girls throughout the Anglosphere since the 1800s, though it was most common in the United Kingdom and in British Commonwealth countries in the late 19th and early 20th centuries. Newspapers.com records the use of "Miss Heather" in reference to a girl's name as early as 2 August 1852, in The New York Times. An infant by the name of Miss Heather Campbell arrived on a ship from Glasgow in New York, with her mother.

The name first appeared among the top 1,000 names for American girls in 1935. It was among the top 100 names for American girls from 1967 to 1998 and a top 10 name from 1972 to 1987. The name remained among the top 1,000 names for American girls until 2016 but has since declined in popularity. Heather was also among the top 1,000 names for American boys between 1974 and 1977.

Heather was among the top 100 names for girls in England and Wales from the 1930s to the early 1990s. It has since declined in use but remained among the top 1,000 names for girls through 2023. It has been a similarly popular name for girls in Australia, Canada, Ireland, and New Zealand.

Popular culture has affected usage of the name. The name steadily increased in use through the 1950s and 1960s but spiked in popularity after the Walt Disney Company television movie Guns in the Heather aired in the United States in 1969. The 1989 American teen black comedy film Heathers, featuring three evil characters named Heather, likely contributed to a decline in use of the name. The name was out of step with current fashions by 2018.

=== A–C ===
- Heather Agyepong, British photographer, visual artist, performer and actress
- Heather Ahtone, American and Chickasaw academic and museum curator
- Heather Albert (born 1968), American professional bicycle racer
- Heather Aldama (born 1978), American soccer player
- Heather Altman, American real estate agent and reality television presenter
- Heather Anderson (born 1959), Scottish politician
- Heather Anderson (1994–2022), Australian Army soldier and Australian rules footballer
- Heather Angel (actress) (1909–1986), English actress
- Heather Angel (photographer) (born 1941), English photographer
- Heather Elizabeth Apple (born 1948), Canadian writer, artist, and educator, with an interest in organic horticulture
- Heather Armbrust (born 1977), American professional female bodybuilder
- Heather Armitage (born 1933), British Olympic sprinter, British record holder for the 100 yards
- Heather Armstrong (1975–2023), American blogger and internet personality
- Heather Artinian (born 1993), deaf American lawyer who was the subject of the documentary Sound and Fury when she was a child
- Heather Asch (born 1966), American puppeteer
- Heather Ashton (1929–2019), British psychopharmacologist and physician
- Heather Bagnall (born 1974), American politician
- Heather Baker (born 1984), American producer, guitarist and musical director
- Heather Baldwin, American politician
- Heather Ballinger (born 1982), Australian rugby league footballer
- Heather Bambrick (born 1971), Canadian jazz singer, voice over artist, radio broadcaster and teacher
- Heather Bansley (born 1987), Canadian beach volleyball player and Olympian
- Heather Barnabe, Girls20's CEO
- Heather Barnett, English artist and academic
- Heather Baron-Gracie (born 1995), British singer, songwriter, and musician
- Heather Battaly, American academic
- Heather Battey, British statistician
- Heather Bauer, American politician
- Heather Beers, American actress and freelance writer
- Heather Bellson, American television producer and writer
- Heather Berghmans (born 1988), American politician
- Heather Bergsma (née Richardson; born 1989), American Olympic speed skater
- Heather Berlin, American neuroscientist and licensed clinical psychologist
- Heather Bishoff, American politician
- Heather Bishop (born 1949), Canadian folk singer-songwriter
- Heather Black (1951–2020), Scottish campaigner
- Heather Ratnage Black (born 1973), British skeleton coach
- Heather Blitz (born 1968), American dressage rider and Olympian
- Heather Blush, Canadian jazz singer
- Heather Booth (born 1945), American civil rights activist, feminist, and political strategist
- Heather Botting (born 1948), Canadian academic and Wiccan chaplain
- Heather Boushey (born 1970), American economist
- Heather Bown (born 1978), American volleyball player
- Heather Boyd, American politician
- Heather Brand (born 1982), Zimbabwean swimmer and Olympian
- Heather Brandon, South African Girl Guides executive
- Heather Brandt, American behavioral scientist
- Heather Bratton (1987–2006), American fashion model
- Heather Manchin (born 1969), American business executive and CEO of Mylan
- Heather Brewer-Segal (1931–2006), Bermudian tennis player
- Heather Bright, American singer, songwriter, DJ and record producer
- Heather Brigstocke, Baroness Brigstocke (1929–2004), British schoolteacher, academic and Conservative Life Peer
- Heather Woods Broderick (born 1983), American musician and composer
- Heather Brooke (born 1970), British-American journalist and freedom of information campaigner
- Heather Buchman (born 1965), American conductor and trombonist
- Heather E. Bullock, American social psychologist
- Heather Burge (born 1971), American basketball player
- Heather Burke (born 1966), Australian historical archaeologist
- Heather "Hedy" Burress (born 1973), American actress
- Heather Burns, American actress
- Heather Cadsby, Canadian poet and publisher
- Heather Came, New Zealand activist, academic and anti-racism scholar
- Heather Cameron, American neuroscientist
- Heather Cameron, Canadian and British social theorist and social entrepreneur
- Heather Campbell (born 1973), Inuk artist
- Heather Anne Campbell, American writer, comedian, podcast host, and actress
- Heather Carroll, Canadian/British multi-disciplinary artist
- Heather Carter, American politician
- Heather Castleden (born 1970), Canadian geographer
- Heather Chaplet, textile designer based in Burkina Faso
- Heather Chasen (1927–2020), English actress
- Heather Child (1911–1997), English calligrapher, heraldic artist, botanical illustrator and author
- Heather Childers, anchor for Fox and Friends First
- Heather Christensen (born 1979), American model
- Heather Christian, American singer, playwright, and composer
- Heather L. Clah, American and Navajo lawyer
- Heather Clark (born 1980), American mixed martial artist
- Heather Clark, South African surfer
- Heather Clark, American writer, literary critic and academic
- Heather Clarke (born 1958), Canadian rower and Olympian
- Heather Cloud, American politician
- Heather Collins (born 1946), Canadian children's book illustrator
- Heather Cooke (born 1988), American professional soccer player
- Heather Conkie, Canadian television writer and producer who began her career as an actress
- Heather Conley, American president of the German Marshall Fund of the United States
- Heather Connell, American film director
- Heather Cook (born 1956), American deposed Episcopal Church bishop
- Heather Coombridge (born 1953), New Zealand swimmer and Olympian
- Heather Cooney (born 1989), Irish camogie player
- Heather Corinna (born 1970), American author, activist, and Internet publisher
- Heather Corrie (born 1971), British-born slalom canoeist
- Heather Couper (1949–2020), British astronomer, broadcaster and science populariser
- Heather Cowell (born 1996), English rugby union player
- Heather Cox (born 1970), American sportscaster
- Heather Craney (born 1971), English actress
- Heather Croall (born 1967), British-Australian filmmaker and festival director
- Heather Crowe (activist) (1945–2006), Canadian anti-smoking campaigner
- Heather Currie, British gynaecologist

=== D–H ===
- Heather Dale, Canadian Celtic folk musician, author, entrepreneur, and filker
- Heather Daly-Donofrio (born 1969), American professional golfer
- Heather Davis (born 1974), Canadian rower
- Heather Day, American artist
- Heather Deal, Canadian biologist and politician
- Heather De Lisle (born 1976), American television presenter
- Heather Dewdney (born 1947), English cricketer
- Heather Dewey-Hagborg (born 1982), information artist and bio-hacker
- Heather M. Dick (1932-2007), Scottish microbiologist
- Heather Doerksen (born 1980), Canadian actress
- Heather Donahue (born 1974), American actress
- Heather Doram, Antiguan artist, actor, activist and educator, who is the designer of Antigua and Barbuda's national costume
- Heather Douglas (born 1969), American philosopher
- Heather Duby (born 1974), American singer-songwriter
- Heather Dubbeldam, Canadian architect
- Heather Dubrow (born 1969), American actress and television personality
- Heather Eatman (born 1968), American songwriter, singer, graphic artist, and portraitist
- Heather Edelson (born 1981), American politician
- A. Heather Eliassen, American public health researcher and academic
- Heather Rae El Moussa (née Young; born 1987), American model and actress
- Heather Elvis (1993 – disappeared 2013), American missing person
- Heather Engebretson (born 1990), American lyric soprano
- Heather Erickson (born 1993), American Paralympic sitting volleyball player
- Heather Mae Erickson (born 1977), American artist, craftsperson, and designer
- Heather Erxleben (born 1966), former Canadian Forces soldier who was the first female to graduate from a Regular Force infantry trades training course
- Heather Ezell (born 1987), American basketball coach and former player
- Heather Fargo (born 1952), American politician
- Heather Farr (1965–1993), American professional golfer on the LPGA Tour
- Heather Fell (born 1983), British modern pentathlete turned triathlete and Olympian
- Heather Ferbert, American lawyer and educator
- Heather M. Ferguson, professor, malaria vector biologist
- Heather Firbank (1888–1954), English socialite
- Heather Fischer (born 1988), American racing cyclist
- Heather Fitzenhagen (born 1960), American politician
- Heather Fogarty (born 1984), American musician and actress
- Heather Fong (born 1956), American security official and the former chief of police for San Francisco, California
- Heather Foord (born 1965), Australian television journalist
- Heather Ford, South African Researcher, blogger, journalist, social entrepreneur, open source activist
- Heather Forsyth (born 1950), Canadian politician
- Heather Foster (born 1966), Jamaican-born American professional bodybuilder
- Heather Frederiksen (born 1985), British Paralympic swimmer
- Heather Fuhr (born 1968), Canadian triathlete
- Heather Galbraith, New Zealand fine art curator and academic
- Heather B. Gardner (born 1971), American hip-hop artist
- Heather Garriock (born 1982), Australian former soccer player and coach
- Heather Gay (born 1974), American television personality, businesswoman and author
- Heather Gell (1896–1988), Australian kindergarten teacher and early proponent of Dalcroze eurhythmics to Australia
- Heather George (1907–1983), Australian commercial photographer
- Heather Gerken (born 1969), American legal scholar
- Heather Gladney (born 1957), American author
- Heather Getha-Taylor, American sociologist
- Heather Giugni, American filmmaker and politician
- Heather Goad, Canadian linguist
- Heather Goldenhersh, American actress
- Heather Goodall (1950–2026), Australian academic and historian
- Heather Goodchild (born 1977), Canadian artist and costume designer
- Heather Gooding (born 1958), Barbadian sprinter
- Heather Goodman (1935–2022), British fell runner and former canoeist
- Heather Gordon (born 1967), American contemporary visual artist
- Heather Goulding, American politician
- Heather Grabbe, political scientist
- Heather Graham (born 1996), Australian cricketer
- Heather Graham (born 1970), American actress
- Heather Graven, British atmospheric scientist
- Heather Greenwood (born 1958), American freestyle swimmer
- Heather Guino-o (born 1997), Filipina volleyball player
- Heather Gustafson, American politician
- Heather Hach, American screenwriter, librettist, and novelist
- Heather Hadwick (born 1979), American farmer and politician
- Heather Haldane, Canadian television producer
- Heather Halley (born 1969), American film, television, stage and voice actress
- Heather Hallett, Baroness Hallett (born 1949), British judge
- Heather Hancock (born 1965), British former civil servant and academic
- Heather Grace Hancock, American actress
- Heather Hardy (born 1982), American former professional boxer and mixed martial artist
- Heather Harper (1930–2019), Northern Irish operatic soprano
- Heather Harrington (born 1984), American mathematician
- Heather Hart (born 1975), American visual artist
- Heather Harvey (1899–1989), British writer and politician
- Heather Hattin (born 1961), Canadian rower and Olympian
- Heather Havrilesky (born 1970), American author, essayist, and humorist
- Heather Headley (born 1974), Trinidadian singer and actress
- Heather Heggestad, Canadian curler
- Heather Hemmens (born 1984), American actress
- Heather Henderson (born 1973), American professional burlesque dancer and podcast host who uses the stage name Baby Heather
- Heather Hendrickson, American microbiologist based in New Zealand
- Heather French Henry (born 1974), American fashion designer, politician, veterans advocate and beauty pageant titleholder who was crowned Miss America 2000
- Heather Henson (born 1970), American contemporary puppet artist, the daughter of Jim Henson
- Heather Heying (born 1969), American evolutionary biologist, former professor, and author
- Heather Heywood (born 1950), Scottish folk singer
- Heather Higginbottom (born 1972), American government official
- Heather Higgins (born 1959), American businesswoman, political commentator, and non-profit sector executive
- Heather H. Hill, American television director and producer
- Heather Rafe Hill (born 1960), Australian politician
- Heather Hiscox (born 1965), Canadian news anchor
- Heather M. Hodges (born 1946), American foreign service officer
- Heather Holley, American music producer, songwriter, vocalist, vocal producer, composer, pianist, and Pro Tools engineer
- Heather Hora (born c. 1970), American politician
- Heather Horst, American anthropologist
- Heather Horton (born 1974), Canadian fine artist
- Heather Houston (born 1959), Canadian curler
- Heather H. Howard, American health policy expert
- Heather Hudson, American artist
- Heather Humphreys (born 1960), Irish politician
- Heather Hunt (born 1973), Canadian rugby union playe
- Heather Hunter (born 1969), American entertainer
- Heather Hurst (born 1975), American archaeologist and archaeological illustrator
- Heather Hutt (born 1959), American politician

=== I–M ===
- Heather Igloliorte (born 1979), Inuk scholar, independent curator and art historian
- Heather Ingman (born 1953), British academic
- Heather Innes (born 1939), Australian athlete and Olympian
- Heather Jackson (born 1984), American triathlete and track cyclist
- Heather Jansch (1948–2021), British sculptor
- Heather Jenner (1914–1991), British matchmaker
- Heather Jensen (born 1985), Canadian curler
- Heather Lynn Johnsen, American U.S. Army soldier
- Heather Jones (born 1970), Canadian field hockey player
- Heather Joseph, American Open Access advocate
- Heather Joshi (born 1946), British academic, economist, and demographer
- Heather Juergensen (born 1970), American actress and writer
- Heather Kadin (born 1972), American television producer and film producer
- Heather Kafka (born 1972), American film, television, and voice actress
- Heather Kalenchuk (born 1984), Canadian curler
- Heather Kampf (born 1987), American middle-distance runner
- Heather Keckler (born 1977), American beauty pageant contestant and dancer
- Heather Keeler (born 1981), American politician
- Heather Keith, Canadian politician
- Heather Kelley, American media artist, writer and video game designer
- Heather Kemkaran (born 1958), Canadian competitive figure skater and Olympian
- Heather Kerr (born 1991), English rugby union player
- Heather King (born 1952), American writer, blogger and speaker
- Heather Klimchuk (born 1958), Canadian politician
- Heather Knight, British archaeologist
- Heather Knight (born 1990), English cricketer
- Heather Knight, American journalist
- Heather Joy Knight, Jamaican born American educator and former college president
- Heather Koldewey, British biologist
- Heather Kozar (born 1976), American model Playboy's Playmate of the Month, January 1998
- Heather Kulik, American computational materials scientist and engineer
- Heather Kuttai (born 1969 or 1970), Canadian Paralympic shooter
- Heather Kuzmich (born 1986), American fashion model and America's Next Top Model, Cycle 9 participant
- Heather Land, American comedian
- Heather Langenkamp (born 1964), American actress
- Heather Langham (born 1989), Australian field hockey player
- Heather Lank, Canadian Parliamentary Librarian
- Heather Lawless, American actress, comedian, and voice actress
- Heather Lechtman, American materials scientist and archaeologist
- Heather Lende, American author, news writer, and politician
- Heather Levi, American anthropologist
- Heather Lewandowski, American physicist
- Heather Lewis (born 1962), American multi-instrumentalist and founding member of Beat Happening
- Heather Lewis (c. 1962–2002), American writer
- Heather Lieberg (born 1979), American long-distance runner
- Heather Lind (born 1983), American actress
- Heather Little-White (1952–2013), Jamaican nutritionist, journalist and disabilities activist
- Heather Locklear (born 1961), American actress
- Heather Loeffler, American set decorator
- Heather Logan-Sprenger, Canadian professional road cyclist
- Heather Logghe, American Surgical Research Fellow at Thomas Jefferson University Hospital
- Heather Longstaffe, Canadian singer-songwriter
- Heather Lyke (born 1970), American former athletic director and university administrator
- Heather J. Lynch, American academic
- Heather Maahs, Canadian politician
- Heather MacAllister (1968–2007), American burlesque performer and social justice activist
- Heather Mac Donald (born 1956), American political commentator, essayist, attorney, and author
- Heather MacDougall, American lawyer, former government official, and business executive
- Heather Mack (born 1995), American heiress convicted of murdering her mother
- Heather Beach Maclean (born 1972), American author
- Heather Maclean (born 1992), Canadian competitive swimmer and Olympian
- Heather Maclean (born 1995), American middle-distance runner
- Heather MacNeil, Canadian archivist
- Heather MacRae (born 1946), American actress
- Heather Macy (born 1978), American college basketball coach
- Heather Mallick (born 1959), Canadian columnist, author and lecturer
- Heather Maloney (born 1985), American singer-songwriter
- Heather Mandoli (born 1982), Canadian rower
- Heather Manfredda (born 1986), American World Long Drive competitor
- Heather Mann (born 1989), British individual rhythmic gymnast
- Heather Marks (born 1988), Canadian model
- Heather Marsh, Canadian philosopher, programmer and human rights activist
- Heather Martin (born 1963), Canadian curler
- Heather Martin, British designer
- Heather Masse (born 1982), American alto singer and member of the Canadian folk trio The Wailin' Jennys
- Heather Matarazzo (born 1982), American actress
- Heather Lin̄i-Leo Matas (died 2016), Vanuatu lawyer
- Heather Matson, American politician
- Heather Matthews (born 1946), New Zealand middle-distance runner
- Heather Maxwell (born 1949), American singer-songwriter and radio host for Voice of America
- Heather Maynard, American chemist
- Heather Mazur, American actress
- Heather McAdam, American actress
- Heather McCartney (born 1962), American-British potter and artist, daughter of Linda McCartney and adopted daughter of Paul McCartney
- Heather McComb (born 1977), American actress
- Heather McDermid (born 1968), Canadian rower
- Heather McDonald (born 1970), American stand-up comedian, actress and author
- Heather McElhatton, American writer and producer
- Heather "H.C." McEntire, American folk musician
- Heather McEwen (born 1984), Canadian actress
- Heather McGhee (born 1980), American author and policy advocate
- Heather McGowan, American writer
- Heather McGregor (born 1962), British executive, journalist, and academic
- Heather McHugh (born 1948), American poet
- Heather McLean (born 1993), Canadian speed skater and Olympian
- Heather McMahan (born 1987), American actress, comedian, and writer
- Heather McNair, American actress
- Heather McNairn, Canadian federal research scientist
- Heather McNaugher, American poet
- Heather McPherson (born 1972), Canadian politician
- Heather McPhie (born 1984), American freestyle moguls skier and Olympian
- Heather McRobie, British-Australian writer, academic, founder of the space consultancy Astrodottir
- Heather McTaggart (born 1962), British born Australian politician
- Heather Melville (born 1962), British banker
- Heather Menzies (1949–2017), Canadian actress
- Heather Mercer (born 1976), American aid worker
- Heather Sue Mercer, American plaintiff in lawsuit against Duke University
- Heather Meyer (born 1980), American politician
- Heather Miller (born 1966), American businesswoman
- Heather Ross Miller (born 1939), American writer
- Heather Miller-Koch (born 1987), American track and field athlete and Olympian
- Heather Mills (born 1968), British model and activist; the second wife of Paul McCartney
- Heather Mitchell, Australian actress
- Heather Mitts (born 1978), American professional soccer player
- Heather Mizeur (born 1972), American politician
- Heather Monro (born 1971), British orienteer
- Heather Moody (born 1973), American water polo player and Olympian
- Heather Moore, American engineer
- Heather B. Moore, American writer
- Heather Morgan, American actress and comedian
- Heather Morgan, American country music singer-songwriter
- Heather Morison (born 1973), Welsh artist
- Heather Morris (born 1953), New Zealand author who lives in Australia
- Heather Morris (born 1987), American actress and dancer from Glee
- Heather Morrison, Canadian emergency room physician
- Heather Moyse (born 1978), Canadian bobsledder and rugby union player
- Heather Munroe-Blum (born 1950), Canadian academic and businesswoman
- Heather Myles (born 1962), American country music singer

=== N–R ===
- Heather Nabozny (born 1970), American groundskeeper
- Heather Nauert (born 1970), American broadcast journalist and former U.S. State Department spokesperson
- Heather Nedohin (born 1975), Canadian curler
- Heather Nevay (born 1965), Scottish painter and illustrator
- Heather Newsham (born 1977), Canadian softball player and Olympian
- Heather Nicholson, British animal rights activist
- Heather Nicholson (1931–2019), New Zealand geologist and writer
- Heather North (1945–2017), American voice actress
- Heather Norton (born 1966), British judge
- Heather Nova (born 1967), Bermudian singer-songwriter and poet
- Heather Nuhfer (born 1982), American comic book writer
- Heather Oakes (born 1959), English sprinter
- Heather O'Donnell, American classical pianist and psychologist living in Düsseldorf, Germany
- Heather O'Donoghue, British academic
- Heather Oesterle (born 1979), American women's basketball assistant coach and former player
- Heather Ogden (born 1980), Canadian ballet dancer
- Heather Oliver (born 1987), Australian professional basketball player
- Heather Olmstead, American college volleyball coach
- Heather Olver (born 1986), English badminton player
- Heather O'Neill (born 1973), Canadian novelist, poet, short story writer, screenwriter and journalist
- Heather O'Reilly (born 1985), American soccer player
- Heather O'Rourke (1975–1988), American actress
- Heather Owens (born 1983), American professional wrestler
- Heather Parisi (born 1960), American-born Italian dancer, singer and television personality
- Heather Pease (born 1975), American synchronized swimmer and Olympic champion
- Heather Parry (born 1971), American television and film producer
- Heather Patisaul, American neuroendocrinologist
- Heather Patrick, American physicist
- Heather Paxson, American cultural anthropologist and science and technology studies scholar
- Heather Payne (born 2000), Irish professional footballer
- Heather Peace (born 1975), British actress
- Heather Penney (born 1974), American defense policy expert
- Heather Petri (born 1978), American water polo player and Olympian
- Heather Phillips, American operatic coloratura soprano
- Heather Pick (1970–2008), American television news anchor
- Heather Podesta (born 1970), American lawyer and lobbyist
- Heather Graham Pozzessere (born 1953), American romance novelist
- Heather Pressdee (born 1982), American nurse and convicted serial killer
- Heather Pringle, Canadian freelance science writer
- Heather L. Pringle, American U.S. Air Force major general
- Heather Purnell (born 1986), Canadian gymnast and Olympian
- Heather Purser, American and Suquamish LGBT advocate
- Heather Quinlan (born 1974), American writer and filmmaker
- Heather Rabbatts (born 1955), Jamaican-born British solicitor, businesswoman, and broadcaster
- Heather Rae (born 1966), American film and television producer and director
- Heather Raffo (born 1970), American actress
- Heather Ramsdell, American poet and playwright
- Heather Rankin (born 1967), Canadian singer, songwriter and actress
- Heather Rattray, American actress
- Heather Raymond, American politician
- Heather Reid (born c. 1969), Scottish meteorologist, physicist, science communicator and educator
- Heather Reisman (born 1948), Canadian businesswoman and philanthropist
- Heather Rhyne, American politician
- Heather Rich (1980–1996), American murder victim
- Heather Richards, Scottish football forward
- Heather Cox Richardson (born 1962), American historian, author, and educator
- Heather Ridout (born 1954), Australian businesswoman
- Heather Ripley (born 1959), Scottish actress
- Heather Roberts, Botswanan international lawn bowler
- Heather Robertson (1942–2014), Canadian journalist, novelist and non-fiction writer
- Heather Robinson, American independent journalist and commentator
- Heather Robinson (born 1978), American screenwriter, film producer and author
- Heather Roffey (born 1986), Caymanian swimmer and Olympian
- Heather Rogers (1959–2023), English barrister
- Heather Rose (born 1964), Australian author
- Heather Ross, American film director
- Heather J. Ross, Canadian professor of medicine
- Heather Ross-McManus (born 1973), Canadian trampoline gymnast and Olympian
- Heather Roy (born 1964), New Zealand politician
- Heather Royer (born 1974), American economist
- Heather Royes (born 1943), Jamaican media consultant, HIV/AIDS consultant and poet
- Heather Russell (born 2000), Canadian singer-songwriter

=== S–Z ===
- Heather Samuel (born 1970), sprinter from Antigua and Bermuda
- Heather Sanborn, American politician
- Heather Savory (born 1963), British former chair of the United Kingdom government's Open Data User Group
- Heather Scheuber (born 1988), English footballer
- Heather Scott, American biologist, businesswoman, and politician
- Heather Sears (1935–1994), British stage and screen actress
- Heather J. Sharkey (born 1967), American historian
- Heather Sheardown, Canadian academic
- Heather Sheehan (born 1961), American artist who lives and works in Cologne, Germany
- Heather Shimmen (born 1957), Australian artist
- Heather Shipley, American environmental engineer and academic administrator
- Heather Siegers (born 1996), Dutch cricketer
- Heather Sievers, American politician
- Heather Simmons (born c. 1968 or 1969), American public relations professional and politician
- Heather Simmons-Carrasco (born 1970), American competitor in synchronized swimming and Olympic champion
- Heather Simms (born 1970), American actress
- Heather Simpson, New Zealand civil servant
- Heather McGinty Simpson, Scottish broadcast journalist and presenter
- Heather Vivian Simpson, New Zealand animal physiologist and academic
- Heather Singleton, Zimbabwean international lawn bowler
- Heather Sirocki, American politician
- Heather Small (born 1965), British singer
- Heather Smith (born 1972), Canadian curler
- Heather A. Smith, American nurse and academic administrator
- Heather Forster Smith, American judge
- Heather Southcott (1928–2014), Australian politician
- Heather Spears (1934–2021), Canadian-born poet, novelist, artist, sculptor, and educator
- Heather Spohr (born 1979), American blogger and philanthropist
- Heather Stainbrook (born 2001), American professional soccer player
- Heather Standring (born 1928), British illustrator
- Heather Stanning (born 1985), British professional rower
- Heather Stapleton, American environmental organic chemist and exposure scientist
- Heather Steacy (born 1988), Canadian track and field athlete and Olympian
- Heather Steans (born 1963), American politician
- Heather Steel (born 1940), British judge
- Heather Stefanson (born 1970), Canadian politician who served as the 24th premier of Manitoba from 2021 to 2023
- Heather Stephens, American actress
- Heather Stewart (born 1976), English journalist
- Heather Stewart-Whyte (born 1968), British model
- Heather Stott, English weather forecaster
- Heather Straka (born 1972), New Zealand artist
- Heather Strong (1982–2009), American murder victim
- Heather Stuart, Canadian social-epidemiologist
- Heather Surprenant, American politician and farmer
- Heather Sutherland (born 1943), Australian historian and academic
- Heather Suttie, Scottish TV and radio presenter
- Heather B. Swann (born 1961), Australian contemporary artist
- Heather Dawn Sweet (born 1981), Canadian politician
- Dita Von Teese (born Heather Renée Sweet in 1972), American burlesque performer
- Heather Tanguay (born 1944), New Zealand politician
- Heather Tanner (1903–1993), English writer and activist
- Heather Tarr (born 1974), American college softball coach and former player
- Heather Terrell (born 1968), American novelist and lawyer
- Heather Thomas (born 1957), American actress
- Heather Ann Thompson, American historian, author, activist, professor, and speaker
- Heather Dawn Thompson, American and Lakota attorney
- Heather Thomson (born 1940), Canadian soprano
- Heather Tom (born 1975), American actress
- Heather Trost (born 1982), American violinist and singer
- Heather Tully (born 1980), American politician
- Heather Turland (born 1960), Australian long-distance runner
- Heather Tweed (born 1959), visual artist
- Heather Unruh (born 1967), American journalist and former television news anchor
- Heather Vallier, American orthopaedic surgeon
- Heather Variava, American diplomat
- Heather Veitch (born 1974), American Christian missionary
- Heather Viles, British academic
- Heather Vitale, American television journalist
- Heather Wahlquist (born 1977), American film and television actress
- Heather Wakelee, American academic
- Heather Wallace (born 1961), Zambian born Canadian and Scottish squash player
- Heather Ward (born 1938), English badminton player
- Heather Warner (born 1993), Welsh racewalker
- Heather Watson (born 1992), British professional tennis player
- Heather Watts (born 1953), American former ballet dancer and teacher
- Heather Webber, American author of romance and mystery novels
- Heather A. Welch, American judge
- Heather Wells (born 1989), American beauty pageant titleholder from Warren, Ohio who was named Miss Ohio 2013
- Heather Leigh West, American singer and composer
- Heather Wheeler (born 1959), British politician
- Heather Whelan (born 1977), Irish cricketer
- Heather Whitestone (born 1973), Miss America winner
- Heather Widdows (born 1972), British philosopher
- Heather Wilde, English actress
- Heather Willauer (born 1974), American analytical chemist and inventor
- Heather Willens (born 1971), American professional tennis player
- Heather Williams (born 1955), American biologist
- Heather Andrea Williams, American lawyer and academic
- Heather Williams (born 1963), British High Court judge
- Heather Ann Williams (born 1977), British medical physicist
- Heather Holder Williams (born 1976), American singer-songwriter
- Heather Wilson (born 1960), American politician and university president
- Heather Wilson (born 1982), Irish racing cyclist
- Heather Gemmen Wilson (born 1971), Canadian author and editor of children's books
- Heather Wolfe (born 1971), American curator of manuscripts and archivist at the Folger Shakespeare Library
- Heather Wright (born 1950), English actress
- Heather Wurtele (born 1979), Canadian professional triathlete
- Heather Youmans (born 1992), American dancer and singer-songwriter
- Heather Young (born 1945), American actress
- Heather Young, Canadian filmmaker
- Heather Bowie Young (born 1975), American professional golfer
- Heather Zar, South African physician and scientist
- Heather Zichal (born 1976), American executive, consultant, and political advisor who specializes in climate change and environmental policy
- Heather Zurich (born 1987), American former basketball player and coach

== Fictional characters ==
- Heather Cameron (character) (a.k.a Lifeguard), a member of the X-Treme X-Men in Marvel Comics
- Heather Chandler, Heather Duke, and Heather McNamara, the eponymous clique from the 1988 teen film Heathers and the 2014 musical adaptation
- Heather Collins (The Pitt)
- Heather Douglas (Moondragon), a Marvel Comics cosmic superhero
- Heather Glenn, a supporting character of Daredevil in Marvel Comics
- Heather Haversham, a character from the British Channel 4 soap opera Brookside
- Heather Hudson, a member of Alpha Flight in Marvel Comics
- Heather Mason, the female protagonist in Silent Hill 3
- Heather Sinclair, a character in Degrassi: The Next Generation
- Heather Stevens Williams, a character from the American soap opera The Young and the Restless
- Heather Trott, a character from the British soap opera EastEnders
- Heather Tucker (Tempo), a mutant character in Marvel Comics
