= Heather Knight (disambiguation) =

Heather Knight (born 1990) is an English cricketer.

Heather Knight may also refer to:

- Heather Knight (educator), American educator
- Heather Knight (archaeologist), British archaeologist
- Heather Knight (journalist), American journalist
