= Heather Black =

Heather Black may refer to:

- Heather Haversham, also Black, a fictional character from the British soap opera Brookside
- Heather Black (campaigner), Scottish HIV/AIDS activist
- Heather Ratnage Black, British Royal Air Force officer and skeleton racer
