= Logghe =

Logghe could refer to:

- Heather Logghe, surgical research fellow
- Koenraad Logghe, Flemish politician
- Logghe Stamping Company (Logghe Brothers), funny car chassis builders
