= Helmreich =

Helmreich is a surname. Notable people with the surname include:

- Stefan Helmreich, American cultural anthropologist
- William B. Helmreich (1945–2020), Swiss-born American sociologist
