= List of the most popular names in the 1970s in the United States =

These are the most popular given names in the United States for each respective year in the 1970s.

	1970	1971	1972	1973	1974	1975	1976	1977	1978	1979
Male
1	Michael	Michael	Michael	Michael	Michael	Michael	Michael	Michael	Michael	Michael
2	James	James	Christopher	Christopher	Jason	Jason	Jason	Jason	Jason	Christopher
3	David	David	James	Jason	Christopher	Christopher	Christopher	Christopher	Christopher	Jason
4	John	John	David	James	David	James	David	David	David	David
5	Robert	Robert	John	David	James	David	James	James	James	James
6	Christopher	Christopher	Robert	John	John	Robert	John	Robert	Matthew	Matthew
7	William	William	Jason	Robert	Robert	John	Robert	John	John	John
8	Brian	Jason	Brian	Brian	Brian	Brian	Brian	Brian	Robert	Robert
9	Mark	Brian	William	William	Matthew	Matthew	Matthew	Matthew	Brian	Joshua
10	Richard	Scott	Matthew	Matthew	William	William	Daniel	Joseph	Joseph	Brian
Female
1	Jennifer	Jennifer	Jennifer	Jennifer	Jennifer	Jennifer	Jennifer	Jennifer	Jennifer	Jennifer
2	Lisa	Michelle	Michelle	Amy	Amy	Amy	Amy	Melissa	Melissa	Melissa
3	Kimberly	Lisa	Lisa	Michelle	Michelle	Heather	Melissa	Amy	Jessica	Amanda
4	Michelle	Kimberly	Kimberly	Kimberly	Heather	Melissa	Heather	Jessica	Amy	Jessica
5	Amy	Amy	Amy	Lisa	Angela	Angela	Angela	Heather	Heather	Amy
6	Angela	Angela	Angela	Melissa	Kimberly	Michelle	Michelle	Angela	Amanda	Sarah
7	Melissa	Melissa	Melissa	Angela	Melissa	Kimberly	Kimberly	Michelle	Angela	Heather
8	Tammy	Tammy	Stephanie	Heather	Lisa	Lisa	Jessica	Kimberly	Sarah	Angela
9	Mary	Mary	Heather	Stephanie	Stephanie	Stephanie	Lisa	Amanda	Michelle	Nicole
10	Tracy	Julie	Nicole	Rebecca	Rebecca	Nicole	Amanda	Kelly	Nicole	Michelle

== See also ==
- Popularity of birth names for females (United States)
