= Murder Files =

- Also known as: Witness Murder Files
- Genre: Crime documentary
- Directed by: Andy Webb
- Starring: Danilo Restivo; Heather Barnett; John Sweeney; Neil Entwistle
- Country of origin: United Kingdom
- Original language: English
- No. of series: 1
- No. of episodes: 4

Production
- Executive producers: Koulla Anastasi; Steve Anderson
- Producer: Ceri Hubbard
- Production location: Bournemouth
- Editor: Enge Gray
- Running time: 43 minutes
- Production company: Mentorn Media

Original release
- Network: Channel 5
- Release: 28 February – 12 June 2013

Murder Files, also known as Witness Murder Files, is a British crime documentary television series filmed in the United Kingdom in England. The first and only series debuted on Channel 5 on 28 February 2013.

== Synopsis ==
The series takes an in-depth look at some of Britain's most high-profile murders in recent memory and examines just how police nabbed the culprits through interviews with the victim's family members and police detectives.

== Episodes ==
=== The Haircut Killer ===
Episode 1 examines the criminal career of murderer Danilo Restivo, specifically the death of mother, Heather Barnett. It aired on 14 May 2013.

=== The Sketchbook Killer ===
Episode 2 looks at the criminal career of John Sweeney. The episode aired on 12 June 2013.

=== Killer on the Run ===
Episode 3 takes a look at Neil Entwistle, who murdered his wife and child. It aired on 5 June 2013.

=== The Schoolboy Assassin ===
Episode 4 involves a teenager who is suspected of murdering a waiter. It was the premiere episode, which aired on 28 February 2013.

== Home media ==
The programme was released on 31 December 2016 on Netflix in the United States and remained on the platform as of September 2017. On the streaming site, the episodes appear in the order of "The Haircut Killer," "The Schoolboy Assassin," "The Sketchbook Killer," and "Killer on the Run."
