= Castleden =

Castleden is a surname. Notable people with the name include:

- George Hugh Castleden (1895–1969), Canadian politician
- Heather Castleden (born 1970), Canadian geographer
