= Shauna A. Levy =

Shauna A. Levy (born in Montréal) is a Canadian entrepreneur and content creator. She is the founder and CEO of MADGE AND MERCER MODERN APOTHECARY. She is the former Interim CEO of byMINISTRY, an experiential lifestyle brand for the premium cannabis market.

== Career ==
In 1998, Levy cofounded IDS (Interior Design Show) with her father Steven Levy (who also cofounded the One of a Kind Shows), now the largest design fair in North America. At the time, public awareness of design was low and the show provided an opportunity for the general public to see what was new in the world of design. Levy was one of the first in Toronto to invite globally celebrated designers and architects including John Pawson, Marcel Wanders, Bjarke Ingels, Yves Behar, Patricia Urquila, Tom Dixon and many others to speak and share their work. She also believed in the importance of celebrating Canadian Design heroes and created many exhibits and opportunities to do so. Over 50,000 people annually attend over the 4 day event.

Levy founded both the Interior Design Show (IDS) and Expo for Design Innovation & Technology (EDIT), and is the former president and CEO of Design Exchange (DX) in Toronto, Canada's only cultural institution dedicated exclusively to the pursuit of design excellence and innovation.

In 2018, Levy became the Interim CEO of byMINISTRY. In this capacity, Levy created and launched byMINISTRY, a cannabis-forward company with the mission of becoming the cultural authority in a post-normalization world. Working with Chef Ted Corrado as Director of Culinary, the duo were bringing his contemporary cooking style into the evolving world of adaptogenic superfoods and cannabistronomy.

During her time at the helm of Design Exchange(DX), Levy partnered with international organizations including the United Nations Development Programme, The Consulate-General of the Netherlands and governments including the Government of Ontario, and the City of Toronto. She has directed exhibits featuring Canadian and international designers and celebrated personalities, among them Pharrell Williams, Christian Louboutin, David Suzuki, Bruce Mau, and Richard Florida.

== Writing ==
Levy has contributed articles on design fairs, events and trends for Canada's major daily newspapers, including The Globe and Mail, Toronto Star, National Post and publications including Azure, Canadian Interiors and Style at Home. Interior Designers of Canada (IDC) and the International Interior Design Association (IIDA) recognized Levy with the prestigious 2015 Leadership Award of Excellence.

== Awards and recognition ==
Levy was named Women of the Year 2021 by Bay Street Bull, and as one of top 4 Entrepreneurs to watch in Canadian cannabis beauty and wellness.
