= Heather Dubbeldam =

Canadian Archirect

Heather Dubbeldam, OAA, FRAIC, LEED AP, WELL AP is a Canadian architect based in Toronto. She received the 2016 Prix de Rome in Architecture for her research on sustainable housing. In 2003, Dubbeldam founded Dubbeldam Architecture + Design a midsized multidisciplinary firm. Prior to starting her own firm, she worked for Kuwabara Payne McKenna Blumberg (KPMB), where she gained her architectural license. Beyond architectural practice, Dubbeldam contributes to the architectural community as a volunteer on various boards. These boards include: Building Equality in Architecture Toronto (BEAT), Twenty + Change, and the Design Industry Advisory Committee (DIAC). Her volunteering also includes affiliations with multiple architectural schools as a critic and advisory council member. In 2024, Heather was selected by the Royal Architectural Institute of Canada (RAIC) to receive the King Charles III Coronation Medal for Architecture, recognizing her contributions to the profession and the community.

== History ==
=== Career ===
After completing her studies at Carleton University’s School of Architecture, Dubbeldam spent seven years at KPMB before establishing her multidisciplinary studio in Toronto. Her early work for the Gladstone Hotel project in 2005 was the first to gain notice in the press. For the hotel she designed a room in her individual style alongside 15 other artists and designers responsible for their own spaces respectively. In 2008, her firm received the Ontario Association of Architects Best Emerging Practice award.

Dubbeldam's most awarded residential projects include Bunkie on the Hill, Bata Shoe Factory, Through House, Contrast House, and Skygarden House. Additionally, she has designed larger award winning commercial projects such as the headquarters for Azure and Slack. Sustainability has remained a consistent focus throughout her career and her firm actively engages in ongoing research focused on sustainable building practices. This focus on sustainability played a role in her 2016 Prix de Rome win. With the $50,000 prize, she furthered her research on energy-efficient housing in Germany and Scandinavia, contributing to the advancement of passivhaus, net-zero energy homes, and regenerative design. This recognition as one of “Canada's oldest and most prestigious architectural prizes” provided support for Dubbeldam's work, bringing importance to sustainability discourse and fostering progress within the profession.

Dubbeldam's firm has earned over 100 awards that acknowledge their pursuit of design excellence and sustainable design, including the Royal Architectural Institute of Canada (RAIC) 2024 Architectural Practice Award.

== Notable projects ==
=== Bunkie on the Hill (Muskoka, 2023) ===
A modern interpretation of the classic A-frame cabin. The split roof design comprises two intersecting gables articulated by geometric windows. The 93-square-metre cabin is lifted above grade by an insulated concrete form (ICF) foundation, minimizing the amount of concrete necessary and eliminating the need for blasting of the bedrock on site. A finalist at the World Architecture Festival (WAF), Heather traveled to Singapore in November 2024 to present Bunkie on the Hill to an international panel of judges.

==== Project Awards ====
- Grands Prix du Design Awards, 2024 - Gold Award
- The Chicago Athenaeum: Museum of Architecture and Design, 2024 - Future House Award
- Architizer A+ Awards, Private House, 2024 - Popular Choice

=== Bata Shoe Factory (Batawa, 2022) ===
This redevelopment of a former Bata Shoe Company factory in Batawa, Ontario, was undertaken by Toronto architects BDP Quadrangle and Dubbeldam Architecture. “This project is a model for environmental and social sustainability and increased housing density in a rural setting with the lightest impact on the environment,” Dubbeldam said. “The renovated factory now stands to once again become a beacon within the town, focused on a sustainable future.”

==== Project awards ====
- AIA International Awards, 2024 - Merit Award for Architecture
- Canadian Green Building Awards - Winner
- Active House Awards - Winner, Transforming Active Spaces

=== Skygarden House (Toronto, 2015) ===
One of Dubbeldam's most awarded projects is Skygarden House, completed in Toronto in 2015. This architectural work integrates sustainable features while maintaining a clean aesthetic. The project garnered praise for Dubbeldam's intentional design approach, which blended sustainability with contemporary style, a rare occurrence during a time when eco-friendly products often compromised visual appeal.

==== Project Awards ====
- Ontario Association of Architects - Design Excellence Award
- Interior Design Magazine Best of Year Awards - Best of Year Honoree
- Architizer International A+ Award - Popular Choice Winner
- Canadian Green Building Award 2016
- International Design Award - Gold in Sustainable Living/Green
- Architecture Masterprize - Winner in Houses Interior

=== Through House (Toronto) ===
The Through House is an architectural work by Dubbeldam Architecture + Design to renovate a 128-year-old house in a crowded downtown neighbourhood. Renovation projects like this attempt to retrofit and adapt older buildings to meet modern Eco-friendly standards, as a strategy is greatly reduces the carbon footprint of a project as compared to the development of a new building. The projects design language focuses on the repeated use of materials on the exterior and interior of the home, maintaining the intention of the design as blending these experiences together.

==== Project Awards ====
- Canadian Green Building Award
- Ontario Association of Architects Award - Design Excellence
- Ontario Association of Architects Award - People's Choice
- Azure Az Award - Award of Merit
- Azure Az Award - People's Choice
- Re-Thinking the Future Awards - Residential Interior

=== Azure Office (Toronto) ===
Originally an early 20th century transformer factory, Dubbeldam Architecture + Design reworked the building into the new Azure head office. At 5,600 square feet over two levels the office is of a relatively modest scale, hosting an open plan office for 26 workstations alongside meeting rooms and offices. The renovation of the factory building into the Azure headquarters earned the firm the Architecture Masterprize for Office Design. The award committee describes the project as follows:

Throughout, the factory’s original industrial quality has been preserved and accentuated with bold colours and furniture, instilling an authenticity to the space while imbuing it with a creative and vibrant energy. Boasting double height windows, a split-level mezzanine layout, and an abundance of natural light, it is an ideal setting for the creative enterprise it now houses.
