= Public Personnel Management =

- Discipline: Public Administration
- Language: English
- Edited by: Jared J. Llorens

Publication details
- Former names: Personnel Administration and Public Personnel Review
- History: 1972-present
- Publisher: SAGE Publications
- Frequency: Quarterly
- Impact factor: 1.364 (2017)

Standard abbreviations
- ISO 4: Public Pers. Manag.

Indexing
- ISSN: 0091-0260 (print); 1945-7421 (web)
- LCCN: 73643105
- OCLC no.: 01786406

Links
- Journal homepage; Online access; Online archive

Public Personnel Management is a quarterly peer-reviewed academic journal covering all aspects of human resources and public administration. It was established in 1972 as Personnel Administration and Public Personnel Review, which was created from the merger of Personnel Administration and Public Personnel Review. It obtained its current name in 1973. It was founded by the International Public Management Association for Human Resources, and is published by SAGE Publications. The editor-in-chief is Heather Getha-Taylor (University of Kansas). According to the Journal Citation Reports, the journal has a 2017 impact factor of 1.364, ranking it 28 out of 47 journals in the category "Public Administration".
