= Heath (given name) =

Male given name

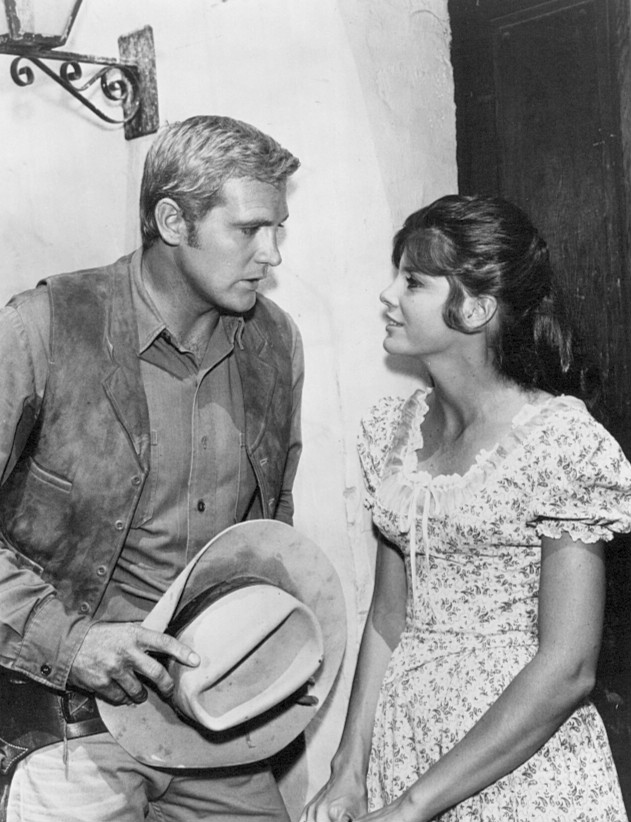
- Lee Majors as Heath Barkley and Katharine Ross as Maria in Winner Lose All, a 1965 episode of the American western television series The Big Valley.
- Gender: Masculine
- Language: Old English

Origin
- Meaning: Heath

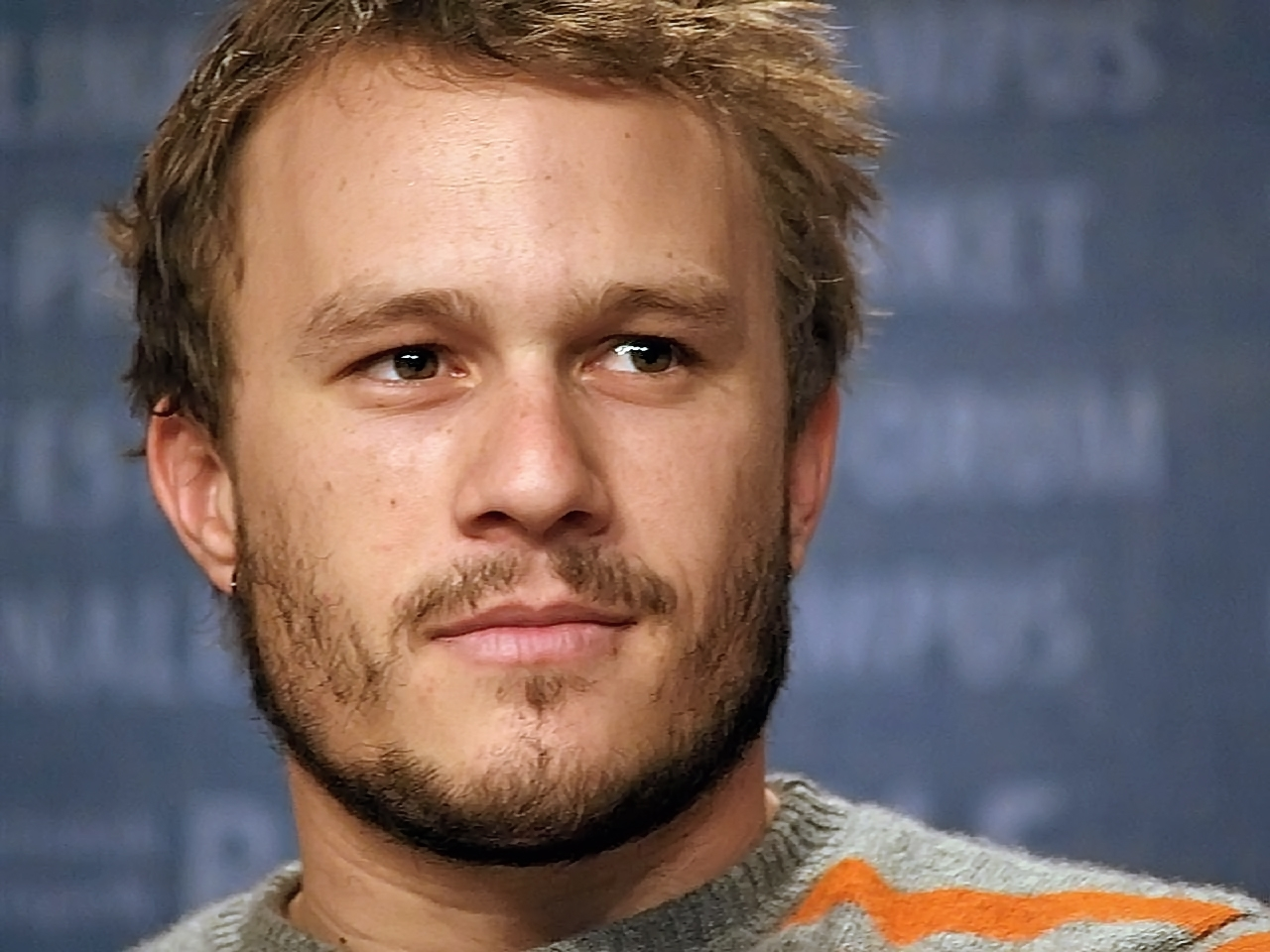
Australian actor Heath Ledger (1979–2008).

Heath is a masculine given name derived from the Old English word hǣþ, or heath. The name is a transferred use of the surname.

== Usage ==
Usage of the name in the Anglosphere has been affected by popular culture. The name first appeared on the list of 1,000 most popular names used for American boys in 1966, the year after the character Heath Barkley, played by actor Lee Majors, debuted on the American western television series The Big Valley. The name might have been regarded as a masculine version of the popular feminine name Heather. Heath remained among the 1,000 most popular names for American boys between 1966 and 2022. The name had a slight spike in popularity in the United States following the death of Australian actor Heath Ledger in January 2008. It had been slowly declining in use and appeared in 903rd place on the popularity chart in 2007, but jumped to 716th place in 2008 and 681st place in 2009. The name declined to 760th place in 2010. Heath no longer appeared among the 1,000 most popular names for American boys as of 2023 but remains in regular use in the United States. Heath has also been among the 1,000 most popular names for boys in the United Kingdom between 2003 and 2023. It also appeared among the 100 most popular names for boys in Australia at different times between 1971 and 1975. Heath has also appeared among the 1,000 most popular names for boys in Canada in recent years.

== Men ==
- Heath Bell (born 1977), American baseball player
- Heath Benedict (1983–2008), American football player
- Heath Black (born 1979), Australian rules footballer
- Heath Davis (born 1971), former New Zealand cricketer
- Heath Davis (director), Australian film director, director of 2018 film Christmess
- Heath Evans (born 1978), American football player
- Heath Herring (born 1978), American martial artist
- Heath L'Estrange (born 1985), Australian rugby league player
- Heath Lamberts (1941–2005), Broadway actor (born James Lancaster)
- Heath Ledger (1979–2008), Australian actor
- Heath MacDonald (born 1966), Canadian politician
- Heath MacQuarrie (1919–2002), Canadian politician, teacher, scholar, and writer
- Heath Miller, American concert promoter, artist manager and hotelier
- Heath Miller (born 1982), American football player
- Heath Ramsay (born 1981), Australian swimmer
- W. Heath Robinson (1872–1944), British cartoonist
- Heath Rylance (born 1972), American football player
- Heath Scotland (born 1980), Australian rules footballer
- Heath Sessions, American politician
- Heath Shuler (born 1971), NFL quarterback and later Democratic Party Representative for North Carolina, U.S.
- Heath Slater (born Heath Miller, 1983), American pro wrestler currently known as Heath
- Heath Streak (1974–2023), Zimbabwean cricketer
- Heath Thorpe (born 2000), Australian artistic gymnast

== Stage name ==
- Heath (musician) (Hiroshi Morie, 1968–2023), Japanese musician, songwriter and member of the band X Japan
