= Heather Williams (biologist) =

American ornithologist

- Born: 1955 (age 70–71); Spokane, Washington
- Education: Bowdoin College; Rockefeller University
- Scientific career
- Fields: Ornithology
- Workplaces: Williams College

Heather Williams (born 1955 in Spokane, Washington) is an American ornithologist and professor at Williams College since 1988. As of October 2025, she is the Visiting Professor of Neuroscience and William Dwight Whitney Professor of Biology, Emerita at Williams. She graduated from Bowdoin College with an A.B. in biology in 1977, from Rockefeller University with a Ph.D. in neuroscience in 1985, and was postdoctoral fellow, Field Research Center. She was a 1993 MacArthur Fellow. Williams' most notable work highlights bird song data gathered on Kent Island, also known as the "Bowdoin Science Station".

== Works ==
- Zeigler, Harris Philip; Marler, Peter (2004). Behavioral Neurobiology of Birdsong. New York Academy of Sciences. ISBN 978-1-57331-472-5. OCLC 55078517.
- Williams, Heather; Scharf, Andrew; Ryba, Anna R.; Ryan Norris, D.; Mennill, Daniel J.; Newman, Amy E. M.; Doucet, Stéphanie M.; Blackwood, Julie C. (11 July 2022). "Cumulative cultural evolution and mechanisms for cultural selection in wild bird songs". Nature Communications. 13 (1): 4001. Bibcode:2022NatCo..13.4001W. doi:10.1038/s41467-022-31621-9. PMC 9276793. PMID 35821243.
