= Heather Kulik =

American physicist

Heather J. Kulik
- Education: Cooper Union B.E. (2004); Massachusetts Institute of Technology Ph.D. (2009)
- Scientific career
- Workplaces: Massachusetts Institute of Technology
- Thesis: First-principles transition-metal catalysis : efficient and accurate approaches for studying enzymatic systems (2009)
- Academic advisors: Judith Klinman, Todd Martinez
- Website: hjkgrp.mit.edu

Heather J. Kulik is an American computational materials scientist and engineer who is the Lammot Du Pont Professor of Chemical Engineering at the Massachusetts Institute of Technology. Her research considers the computational design of new materials and the use of artificial intelligence to predict material properties.

== Early life and education ==
Kulik earned her bachelor's degree in chemical engineering at Cooper Union in 2004. She moved to Massachusetts Institute of Technology for her graduate studies, where she joined the department of materials science and engineering and worked under the supervision of Nicola Marzari. During her doctoral research, she introduced a Hubbard U term to density functional theory calculations, which improved the study of transition metal complexes. Density functional theory allows for the prediction and study of new materials with limited computational cost. Amongst these materials, Kulik concentrated on transition metal complexes, as their highly localized electrons make the unphysical decollimation that occurs in the simplifications of DFT inappropriate. She graduated in 2009 with her Ph.D. in materials science and engineering.

Kulik then conducted postdoctoral research with Felice Lightstone at Lawrence Livermore National Laboratory. She then worked alongside Todd Martínez at Stanford University and Judith Klinman at University of California, Berkeley on the large-scale electronic structures of biomolecules.

== Research and career ==
In 2013, Kulik joined the faculty at Massachusetts Institute of Technology as the Joseph R. Mares Career Development Chair. She specializes in computational modeling and artificial intelligence to accelerate the discovery of new materials and catalysts. In particular, Kulik develops new strategies to improve the accuracy of density functional theory.

== Awards and honors ==
- 2017 I&ECR, Class of 2017 Influential Researcher
- 2018 DARPA Young Faculty Award
- 2019 Journal of Physical Chemistry Lectureship Award
- 2019 National Science Foundation CAREER Award
- 2019 AAAS Marion Milligan Mason Award
- 2019 Princeton University Saville Lecturer
- 2019 Novartis Early Career Award
- 2020 DARPA Director's Fellowship Award
- 2021 Sloan Research Fellowship
- 2025 Presidential Early Career Award for Scientists and Engineers

== Selected publications ==
- Heather J Kulik; Matteo Cococcioni; Damian A Scherlis; Nicola Marzari (September 5, 2006). "Density functional theory in transition-metal chemistry: a self-consistent Hubbard U approach". Physical Review Letters. 97 (10) 103001. arXiv:cond-mat/0608285. Bibcode:2006PhRvL..97j3001K. doi:10.1103/PHYSREVLETT.97.103001. ISSN 0031-9007. PMID 17025809.
- Jon Paul Janet; Heather J Kulik (May 17, 2017). "Predicting electronic structure properties of transition metal complexes with neural networks". Chemical Science. 8 (7): 5137–5152. arXiv:1702.05771. doi:10.1039/C7SC01247K. ISSN 2041-6520. PMC 6100542. PMID 30155224.
- Heather J Kulik (June 1, 2015). "Perspective: Treating electron over-delocalization with the DFT+U method". The Journal of Chemical Physics. 142 (24): 240901. doi:10.1063/1.4922693. hdl:1721.1/101201. ISSN 0021-9606. PMID 26133400.
- Jon Paul Janet; Heather J. Kulik (May 19, 2020). Machine Learning in Chemistry. doi:10.1021/ACS.INFOCUS.7E4001. ISBN 978-0-8412-9900-9.
