= Heather J. Ross =

Professor of Medicine

- Born: Montreal, Quebec, Canada
- Known for: Heart failure, heart transplantation, Test Your Limits
- Awards: Member, Order of Canada CCS Women in Cardiovascular Medicine/Science Mentorship Award, Canadian Heart Failure Society Annual Achievement Award. Canadian Medical Hall of Fame, ESC Inspirational Career Lecture, European Society of Cardiology.

Academic work
- Discipline: Women in Cardiology
- Institutions: University of Toronto

Heather Joan Ross is Professor of Medicine at the University of Toronto in Ontario, Canada. Currently, Ross is a scientific lead for the Ted Rogers Centre for Heart Research and holds the Loretta A. Rogers Chair in Heart Function. She was previously the Head of Cardiology at the Peter Munk Cardiac Centre (2019-2025) and held the Pfizer Chair in Cardiovascular Research at the University of Health Network (2019-2025). Additionally, her past leadership roles include directing the Ted Rogers Centre of Excellence in Heart Function (2010-2018) and the Cardiac Transplant Program (1997-2018) at Toronto General Hospital, as well as the serving as the president of the Canadian Cardiovascular Society and the president of the Canadian Society of Transplantation.

== Education and early life ==
Ross was born in Montreal, Quebec, Canada. At age 11, she did a 100 km bicycle trip and since has been a parachutist, a mountain biker, a rock-climber, a skier and a triathlete. She credits her grandfather and patients for motivating her to exercise and coined the slogan "your life is worth one hour a day". After attending Queen's University for an undergraduate degree in biology, she went to the University of British Columbia for her medical degree and Dalhousie University for her specialization in cardiology. She completed a postdoctoral fellowship in heart failure/heart transplantation at Stanford University. In addition, she studied bioethics, obtaining a master's degree at the University of Toronto.

Ross is a multi-instrumentalist, learning to play the saxophone, guitar and harmonica at a young age. She is currently the lead vocalist of an R&B band called "The Marginal Donors". The band includes two of University Health Network's transplant surgeons, Dr. Mark Cattral and Dr. Paul Greig.

== Career ==
Ross began her career in 1996 at Toronto General Hospital's Peter Munk Cardiac Centre. By 2018, she was involved in the care of over 500 patients undergoing heart transplantation. Ross specializes in issues related to end-of-life in patients with advanced heart failure, targeting gaps in end-of-life care. In 2006, Ross founded Test Your Limits, an organization that has raised over 4 million dollars for heart failure research and included expeditions to Antarctica (2006), Nepal (2008), North Pole (2010), South Pole (2013), Bhutan (2014), Nahanni (2015), Mount Everest (2017), Greenland (2018), Ecuador (2023), and New Zealand (2024). She is the recipient of the Order of Canada (2021), and the inaugural CCS Women in Cardiovascular Medicine/Science Mentorship Award. She was awarded the Ontario Health Quality Award (2024) for her help with Indigenous communities and the Inter-American Society of Cardiology Lifetime Achievement Award (2025).

== Research interests ==
Ross has authored over 470 peer-reviewed publications with an interest in end-of-life care, health equity, mobile health and outcomes in patients with advanced heart failure and heart transplantation.
