= Heather Lewandowski =

American physicist

Heather J. Lewandowski
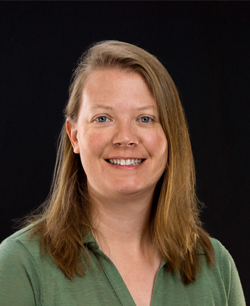
- JILA fellow
- Education: University of Colorado Boulder; Michigan Technological University
- Scientific career
- Workplaces: University of Colorado Boulder; Imperial College London; University of Oxford
- Thesis: Coherences and correlations in an ultracold Bose gas (2002)

Heather Lewandowski is a professor of physics at the University of Colorado Boulder. She looks to understand the quantum mechanical processes in making chemical bonds. She uses time-varying inhomogeneous electric fields (in a Stark decelerator) to achieve supersonic cooling. She also studies how students learn experimental skills in instructional physics labs and help to improve student learning in these environments. She is a Fellow of the American Physical Society.

== Early life and education ==
Lewandowski grew up in Laurium, Michigan. She studied physics at Michigan Technological University and graduated summa cum laude in 1997. Whilst at Michigan Technological University, Lewandowski was a member of the Husky Pep Band. She joined the University of Colorado Boulder for her graduate studies, working with Eric Allin Cornell on Bose gases. During her PhD she observed Bose–Einstein condensate gases, where she could see atoms in different spin states. She described a simplified system to create Bose–Einstein condensate in ^{87}Rb. Her system included a compressed Ioffe-Pritchard trap and large, powerful laser beams. The trap includes powerful permanent magnets and low power electromagnetic coils. She completed her PhD thesis Coherences and correlations in an ultracold Bose gas in 2002. She was a finalist for the American Physical Society Outstanding Doctoral Thesis Research in AMO Physics Award.

== Research ==
Lewandowski was awarded a National Research Council postdoctoral fellowship from the National Institute of Standards and Technology and joined Jun Ye's atomic physics group. Here she developed the systems to create low temperature beams of OH, from H_{2}O seeded in Xenon during a supersonic expansion. This set-up dramatically improved the precision of measurements of transitions of hydroxyl radicals. This understanding will help scientists refine the fine-structure constant and help to establish where it has remained constant since the Big Bang.

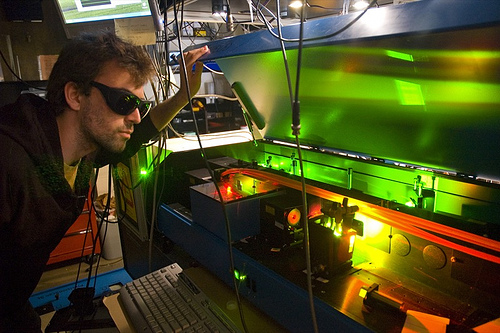
One of her students with a doubled pulse dye laser in 2008

In 2005 Lewandowski was made an assistant professor of Physics at the University of Colorado Boulder and Fellow of the JILA. She was awarded an Air Force Office of Scientific Research Young Investigator Award in 2007. She was also awarded a National Science Foundation CAREER Award, which allowed her to study the interactions of ultracold atoms. She was also awarded an Alfred P. Sloan Foundation fellowship. The dipole-dipole interactions in molecules are anisotropic, and can be used to control collisions in polar molecular systems. She continues to use Stark deceleration to produce cold molecules, then traps them inside electric and magnetic fields to extend their interaction times. She has studied the collisions of these cold molecules with rubidium atoms. She became an associate professor of physics in 2012. She has been investigating collisions between ammonia and rubidium. In 2013 she took part in a Royal Society International Exchange Fellowship, working at Imperial College London.

She was made a Fulbright Program scholar in 2018 and joined the University of Leeds.

=== Physics education research ===
Since 2011 Lewandowski has been involved with physics education research and has been a member of the AAPT since 2007. She serves on the board of the Advanced Laboratory Physics Association (ALPhA). She has been involved in the creation of the Recommendations for the Undergraduate Physics Laboratory Curriculum which was endorsed by the AAPT executive board in 2014. She has looked at transforming laboratory courses. She has looked at the ways to incorporate modelling into upper-division laboratories. In 2015 she organised the National Physics Education Research Conference. She was awarded the American Association of Physics Teachers Homer L. Dodge Citation for Distinguished Service to the AAPT and American Physical Society Wolff-Reichert Award 2018. These awards recognise her commitment "scholarly transformation of advanced laboratories".

=== Awards ===
- 2019 American Physical Society Wolff-Reichert Award for Advanced Laboratory Instruction Award
- 2019 American Association of Physics Teachers Homer L. Dodge Award
- 2018 Fulbright Distinguished Chair Fellowship
- 2018 American Physical Society Fellow
- 2016 Michigan Technological University Presidential Council of Alumnae
- 2013 Royal Society International Exchange Fellowship
- 2012 Merton College International Exchange Fellowship
- 2010 University of Colorado Boulder Chancellor's Award for Excellence in STEM Education
- 2007 National Science Foundation CAREER Award
- 2007 Alfred P. Sloan Foundation Fellowship
- 2007 Air Force Office of Scientific Research Young Investigator Award
- 2005 National Institute of Standards and Technology Best Presentation Award

== Personal life ==
Lewandowski is married to Donald Woodraska, a physicist at the Laboratory for Atmospheric and Space Physics (LASP) at the University of Colorado Boulder.
