= Heather Stuart =

Canadian social-epidemiologist

- Born: Guelph, Ontario, Canada

Academic background
- Education: B.A., 1979, M.A., 1984, Sociology, University of Western Ontario; PhD., 1993, Epidemiology, University of Calgary

Academic work
- Discipline: Health Sciences
- Institutions: University of Calgary; Queen's University

Heather L. Stuart OC FRSC is a Canadian social-epidemiologist. She is a professor in the Department of Public Health Sciences and Bell Mental Health and Anti-Stigma Chair at Queen's University. Stuart is an elected Fellow of the Royal Society of Canada and Member of the Order of Canada.

== Early life and education ==
Stuart grew up in Guelph, Ontario, where she spent most of her days with her administrator mother at a mental hospital. She earned her Bachelor of Arts and Master's degree in Sociology at University of Western Ontario, before graduating with a PhD in epidemiology at the University of Calgary.

== Career ==
After graduating from the University of Calgary, Stuart earned a position with the World Psychiatric Association to start a program that focused on dealing with the prejudice attached to schizophrenia. She then returned to Calgary, where she became an associate professor before leaving for Queen's University.

In 2012, she was appointed the inaugural Bell Canada Mental Health and Anti-Stigma Research Chair. Stuart also chaired the World Psychiatric Association's Scientific Section on Stigma and Mental Health. By 2015, she helped launch the "Caring Campus Project" which aimed to reducing substance misuse amongst first-year male students, along with the related stigma. Two years later, she was reappointed as Bell Canada Mental Health and Anti-Stigma Research Chair for another five years. The next year, Stuart was elected a Fellow of the Royal Society of Canada. She was later appointed a Member of the Order of Canada.
