= Heather Patisaul =

American neuroendocrinologist

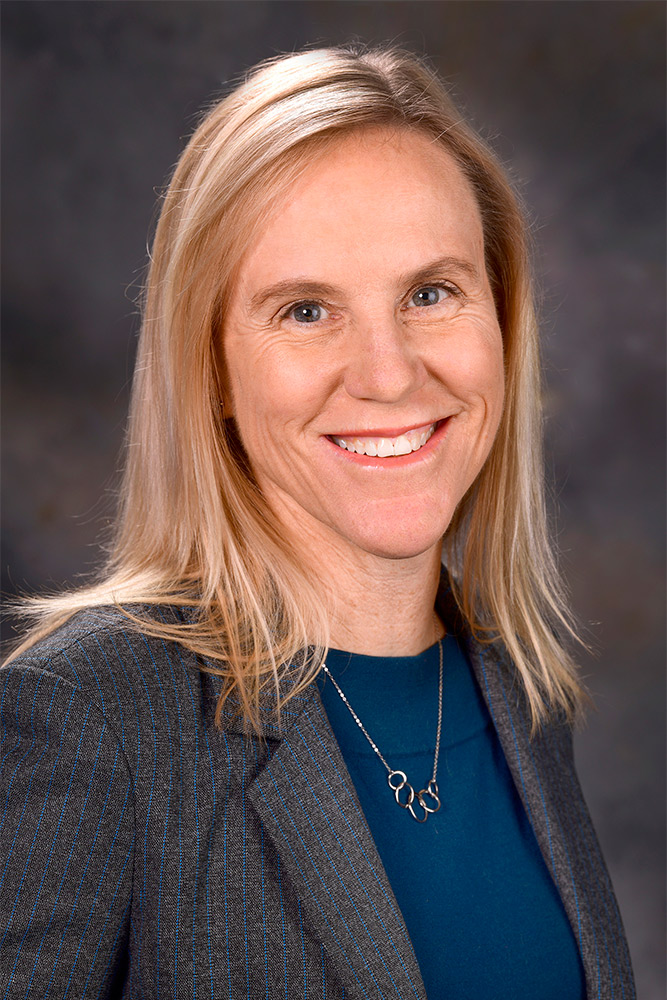
- Patisaul in 2024
- Education: University of Florida; Emory University
- Scientific career
- Fields: Neuroendocrinology, translational toxicology
- Workplaces: North Carolina State University; National Institutes of Health

Heather B. Patisaul is an American neuroendocrinologist who researches the health effects of endocrine disruptors. She has served as the scientific director of the division of translational toxicology at the National Institute of Environmental Health Sciences since 2024.

== Life ==
Patisaul earned a B.S. in zoology from the University of Florida and a Ph.D. in population biology, ecology, and evolution from Emory University in 2001. She completed postdoctoral training at Yerkes National Primate Center and the CIIT Center for Health Research of the Hamner Institute.

Patisaul is a neuroendocrinologist who was the associate dean for research in the North Carolina State University College of Sciences and led a research laboratory focused on uncovering the health effects endocrine disruptors. Her team explored how endocrine disrupting compounds alter neuroendocrine pathways in the brain related to sex-specific physiology and behavior. Patisaul's research examines how endocrine disruptors, such as flame retardants, soy isoflavones, and bisphenol A (BPA), influence puberty, fetal development, and neurodevelopmental disorders, including autism.

In December 2023, she was selected by National Institute of Environmental Health Sciences (NIEHS) director Richard Woychik as the next scientific director of the division of translational toxicology (DTT) effective March 24. She succeeded acting DTT scientific director Robert Sills. The division conducts research focused on the health effects of environmental hazards and provides support for the National Toxicology Program (NTP).
