= Heather Allansdottir =

British-Australian writer and academic

Heather Allansdottir DPhil
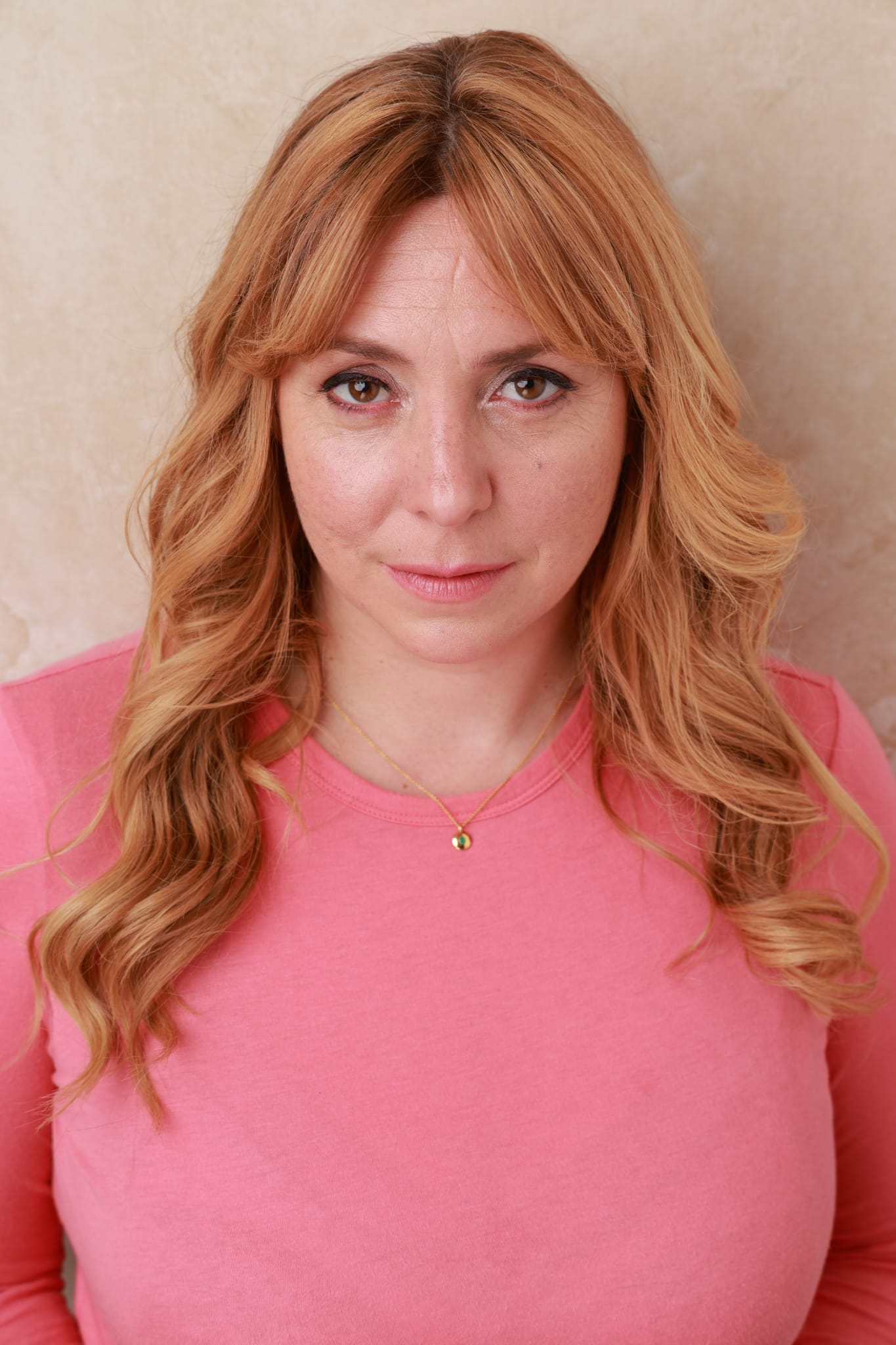
- Allansdottir in 2025
- Born: Heather Katharine McRobie; 28 March 1985 (age 41); Brisbane, Queensland, Australia
- Occupations: Author, academic, space consultant

Academic background
- Education: Hills Road Sixth Form College
- Alma mater: Keble College, Oxford
- Thesis: Legal Mosaics: The Post-Mubarak Egyptian Constitutions, their Legal Legacies and Constitutional Heritages (2015)
- Doctoral advisor: Denis Galligan

Academic work
- Institutions: Keble College, Oxford; Birkbeck University; Lauterpacht Centre for International Law, University of Cambridge

Heather Allansdottir (born as Heather Katharine McRobie) is a British-Australian writer and academic. She is the founder of the space consultancy Astrodottir and was a 2024 Fellowship Candidate at Newspeak House. She is the 2026 residential fellow at Astralship.

== Early life and education ==
She studied at Hills Road Sixth Form College in Cambridge, followed by Modern History and Politics at Oxford University before going on to pursue further studies at the University of Sarajevo and McGill University in Montreal, Canada. Her move from Oxford to Montreal, aged 22, was allegedly inspired by her love of the Canadian singer-songwriter Leonard Cohen.

During her time as an undergraduate at Oxford University, she was a member of the comedy group The Oxford Imps and published creative writing in the May Anthologies collections in 2006 and 2007. Whilst at sixth form, in 2003 she organised protests against the Iraq war with her classmate Samir Jeraj, the New Statesman journalist.

== Career ==
Allansdottir started as an academic in human rights and constitutional law. She completed a doctorate in comparative constitutional law and human rights law, focused on the Egyptian constitutions since the 2011 Egyptian revolution, at the Oxford Law Faculty. She also worked for human rights NGOs in Jordan and Berlin.

She held post-doctoral positions in Tel Aviv and Moscow, before moving to Reykjavík to begin her current work on the Icelandic constitution.

McRobie's debut novel Psalm 119 (2008), published when the author was 23, was awarded the Helene du Coudray Prize. Her first non-fiction book, Literary Freedom: a Cultural Right to Literature, came out in 2013.

She has written for the Guardian, Al Jazeera, the New Statesman, the Times Literary Supplement, Salon, Foreign Policy, and The Globe and Mail, among many other publications. She was also an editor of the online outlet openDemocracy. Her non-academic writing has focused on politics, society, conflict and human rights across the UK, the Balkans, Middle East and former Soviet Union. In an interview in 2018, she said she would like to continue writing both fiction and non-fiction. Her first book on space law, New Perspectives in Outer Space Law, co-authored with Naman Anand, will be published by Springer in 2025.

In 2019, she was a semi-finalist for the Julia Child Fellowship at Le Cordon Bleu culinary school. According to an interview in 2019, she can speak some Arabic, French, Russian, Mandarin and Icelandic but is only fluent in English. Elsewhere she has written satirically on her failure to become proficient in other languages.

== Work on constitutions and space law ==
As an academic, she currently researches and lectures on constitutional law, human rights law, and the philosophy of law, and is completing a book on comparative constitutional law.

Since 2020, she has increasingly worked in the field of space law.

Her work on space law includes founding the research cluster Decolonise the Cosmos and the research project How To Write A Constitution. Her forthcoming books on space law include New Perspectives on Outer Space Law, co-authored with Naman Anand, and Synethic Mens Rea in Space Law, co-authored with Yug Raman Srivastava.

In 2022, she joined The University of Law as an Academic Tutor, and in 2024 was a visiting fellow at the Lauterpacht Centre for International Law at the University of Cambridge, and a fellow at Newspeak House. She is now a 2026 residential fellow at Astralship, where she will continue her work on space law and constitutional law.
