= Heather Martin (designer) =

British interaction designer

Heather Martin is a British designer, especially recognized for her work in interaction design. She is Head of Interaction Design at Fjord in London.

Martin holds an MA in interaction design from the Royal College of Art in London (1998) and a BA in industrial design from the University of Northumbria (1993). She worked as a research fellow and visiting tutor at the Royal College of Art. In 2000 she became a senior interaction designer at IDEO London, where she had the project lead for the interactive, RFID-enabled Prada New York City flagship store with OMA/Rem Koolhaas. During her work at IDEO she helped create a wireless inflight entertainment system for Lufthansa Technik.

In 2003 Martin became an associate professor at the Interaction Design Institute Ivrea (IDII), where she was academic director from 2005-06. After this she moved to Copenhagen and co-founded the Copenhagen Institute of Interaction Design (CIID). In 2012 the Business Insider listed the CIID as one of the world’s best design schools.

She was awarded the Gold and Bronze Business Week Awards for her work with Prada and IDEO.
