= Heather Shipley =

American environmental engineer and academic administrator

- Education: Baylor University (BS); Rice University (MS, PhD)
- Scientific career
- Fields: Environmental engineering
- Workplaces: University of Texas at San Antonio
- Doctoral advisor: Mason B. Tomson

Heather J. Shipley is an American environmental engineer and academic administrator serving as the provost and executive vice president for academic affairs at the University of Texas at San Antonio. She is the inaugural holder of the Hispanic Thriving Institution Endowed Chair for the Dean of University College.

== Life ==
Shipley earned a B.S. in chemistry from Baylor University. She completed a M.S. and Ph.D. in environmental engineering from Rice University. Her 2007 dissertation was titled, Magnetite Nanoparticles for Removal of Arsenic from Drinking Water. Mason B. Tomson was her doctoral advisor.

Shipley joined the faculty at the University of Texas at San Antonio. Her research includes water chemistry, water treatment, and environmental nanotechnology. She held the Burzik Professorship in Engineering Design and is the inaugural holder of the Hispanic Thriving Institution Endowed Chair for the Dean of University College. In the fall of 2017, she became the interim senior vice provost of academic affairs. She later formally assumed the position. On August 1, 2023, she succeeded Kimberly Andrews Espy as the interim provost and senior vice president for academic affairs.
