= Heather Paxson =

American anthropologist

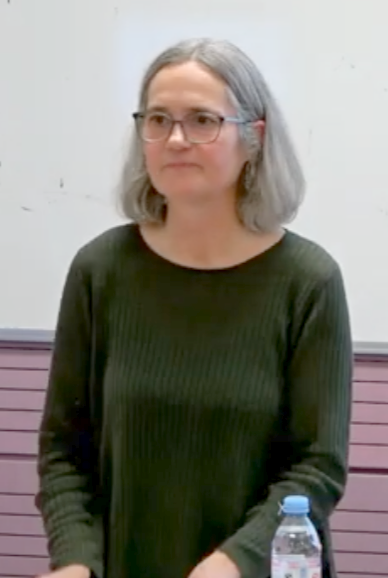
- Giving a lecture at SOAS in 2025
- Education: Haverford College; Stanford University
- Occupation: Cultural anthropologist
- Employer: Massachusetts Institute of Technology
- Spouse: Stefan Helmreich

Heather Paxson is an American cultural anthropologist and science and technology studies scholar. She is an expert on the anthropology of reproduction, and on the anthropology of food, including in particular cheese and commonplace family food practices. She is the William R. Kenan, Jr. Professor of Anthropology at the Massachusetts Institute of Technology.

Paxson is a graduate of Haverford College, and obtained her Ph.D. from Stanford University.

She is an editor of the Oxford Companion to Cheese. Her other books include:

- Making Modern Mothers: Ethics and Family Planning in Urban Greece (University of California Press, 2004)
- The Life of Cheese: Crafting Food and Value in America (University of California Press, 2013)

She is married to fellow cultural anthropologist, STS scholar and professor Stefan Helmreich.
