= Heather Robinson (journalist) =

American independent journalist and commentator

- Born: Pittsburgh
- Occupations: Journalist, commentator
- Website: https://heatherrobinson.net/

Heather Robinson is an American independent journalist and commentator who specializes in writing about the Middle East and American politics. Her writing has appeared in New York Post, The New York Daily News, The Huffington Post, and Jewish News Syndicate, among others. She has appeared on CNN's "Anderson Cooper 360" and is a frequent guest on Fox Across America with Jimmy Failla.

== Career ==
=== Pittsburgh Synagogue Shooting ===
As a Pittsburgh and Squirrel Hill native, Robinson reported on the aftermath and effects of the Pittsburgh synagogue shooting which occurred on October 28, 2018, at Tree of Life Synagogue in Pittsburgh's Squirrel Hill. The shooting killed eleven people and wounded six, including several Holocaust survivors.

=== Simon Deng ===
Robinson has written extensively on Simon Deng, a former Sudanese slave, and Deng's ongoing activism to prevent human rights abuses in Darfur. In 2016, Robinson reported on Sudanese-American activists, including Deng, who gathered outside the United Nations in New York City to urge the United Nations Security Council (UNSC) to enhance protection for civilians in Southern Sudan.

=== Mithal al-Alusi ===
From 2005 to 2014, Robinson has reported on Mithal al-Alusi, a former Iraqi parliamentarian and advocate for liberal values. In 2005, for The New York Post, Robinson wrote on al-Alusi's commitment to building democracy in Iraq after losing his two sons in an insurgent ambush. His visit to Israel led to death threats, and the Iraqi government stripped him of his position as director general of the Iraqi National Commission on de-Ba’athification, but he pressed on, founding the Democratic Party of the Iraqi Nation (DPIN) participating in elections.

In a September 2008 article for The American Spectator, Robinson reported on Mithal al-Alusi urgent warning about Iran's potential to attain nuclear weapons sooner than anticipated. Al-Alusi emphasizes the need for international intelligence cooperation to combat Iran's interference in democratic values.

In an August 2012 article for The Algemeiner, Robinson reported on al-Alusi's suggestion that President Obama should call for a United Nations Security Council resolution stating Syria must give control of its weapons of mass destruction (WMD) to the international community. al-Alusi proposed that Obama hold a conference of Gulf states in Baghdad to discuss the importance of keeping the Strait of Hormuz open.
