= Heather Fogarty =

American musician (born 1984)

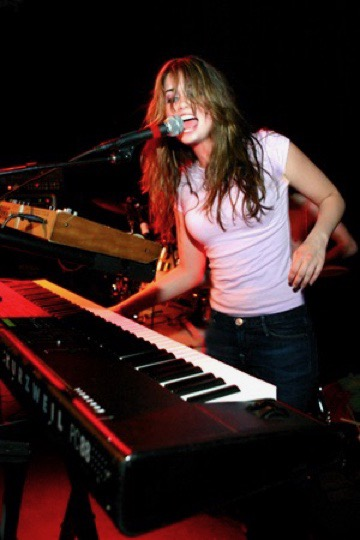
- Fogarty performing at Paradise Rock Club
- Born: Heather Nicole Fogarty; May 22, 1984 (age 42); Boston, Massachusetts, U.S.
- Occupations: Musician, actress
- Years active: 2004–present
- Spouse: Kyle Ward (m. 2016)
- Musical career
- Genres: Rock; Pop rock; Dance-Pop
- Instruments: Vocals; piano; keyboards; synthesizers; tambourine

Heather Fogarty (born May 22, 1984) is an American musician and actress. She is the lead singer and keyboardist for Boston-based rock band On The Surface.

== Early life ==
Heather Fogarty was born in Boston, Massachusetts. She attended Marlborough High School (Massachusetts) where she was active in the theater department. In 2001, she formed the band On The Surface with classmate Anthony Brodeur and drummer Matthew Amdur.

== Stage career ==
Heather Fogarty made her professional stage debut when she was ten years old. She graduated from the University of Connecticut with a Bachelor of Fine Arts in Acting in 2006. She performed with the Connecticut Repertory Theatre in productions including The Crucible, A Christmas Carol, Mother Courage, and Into The Woods.

== Music career ==
Fogarty sings lead and plays keyboards in the band On The Surface. They have released four studio albums including The Fall and were voted "Best Pop Act" by Worcester Magazine. Their songs The Very Best of Me and Let in the Light were featured on MTV's The Hills (TV series). They performed on the Warped Tour in 2008.

In 2011, Fogarty joined musicians Carrick Moore Gerety from Everybody Else and Kevin Seaton of Say Anything (band) to form the Dance-Pop band Divalola. They released the Wallflower EP on November 17, 2011. Their song Wallflower was featured in the video game Saint's Row: The Third.

== Film and television work ==
Heather Fogarty has appeared in television programs including Baby Daddy, Scandal (TV series), and Hit the Floor (TV series). Her film credits include Mortal Kombat: Rebirth, Stone Markers, Icebox, Closing Time and Evil Within. She also appeared in the Butch Walker music video for Synthesizers starring Matthew McConaughey.

== Personal life ==
Heather Fogarty married screenwriter Kyle Ward on July 2, 2016.

== Filmography ==
=== Film ===
| Year | Title | Role | Notes |
|---|---|---|---|
| 2010 | Closing Time | Coffee Bean Chick's Friend | |
| 2010 | Mortal Kombat: Rebirth | Hotness | |
| 2012 | Stone Markers | Cammie Sherman | |
| 2012 | Butch Walker and The Black Widows: Synthesizer | Cheerleader 1 | Music Video |
| 2014 | Icebox | Emily | |
| 2015 | Evil Within | Hanna | |

=== Television ===
| Year | Title | Role | Notes |
|---|---|---|---|
| 2013 | Scandal (TV series) | Hayley | Episode: "Say Hello to My Little Friend" |
| 2014 | Next Time on Lonny | Dog Owner | Episode: "Lonny, The Dog Whisperer" |
| 2014 | Hit The Floor (TV series) | Melissa | Episode: "Shattered Glass" |
| 2015 | Baby Daddy | Daniel | Episode: "It Takes a Village Idiot" |
