= Heather Battaly =

American academic

Heather Battaly is a professor of philosophy at the University of Connecticut specializing in virtue epistemology and epistemic virtues and vices. She is editor-in-chief of the Journal of Philosophical Research and the Journal of the American Philosophical Association.
