= Heather Savory =

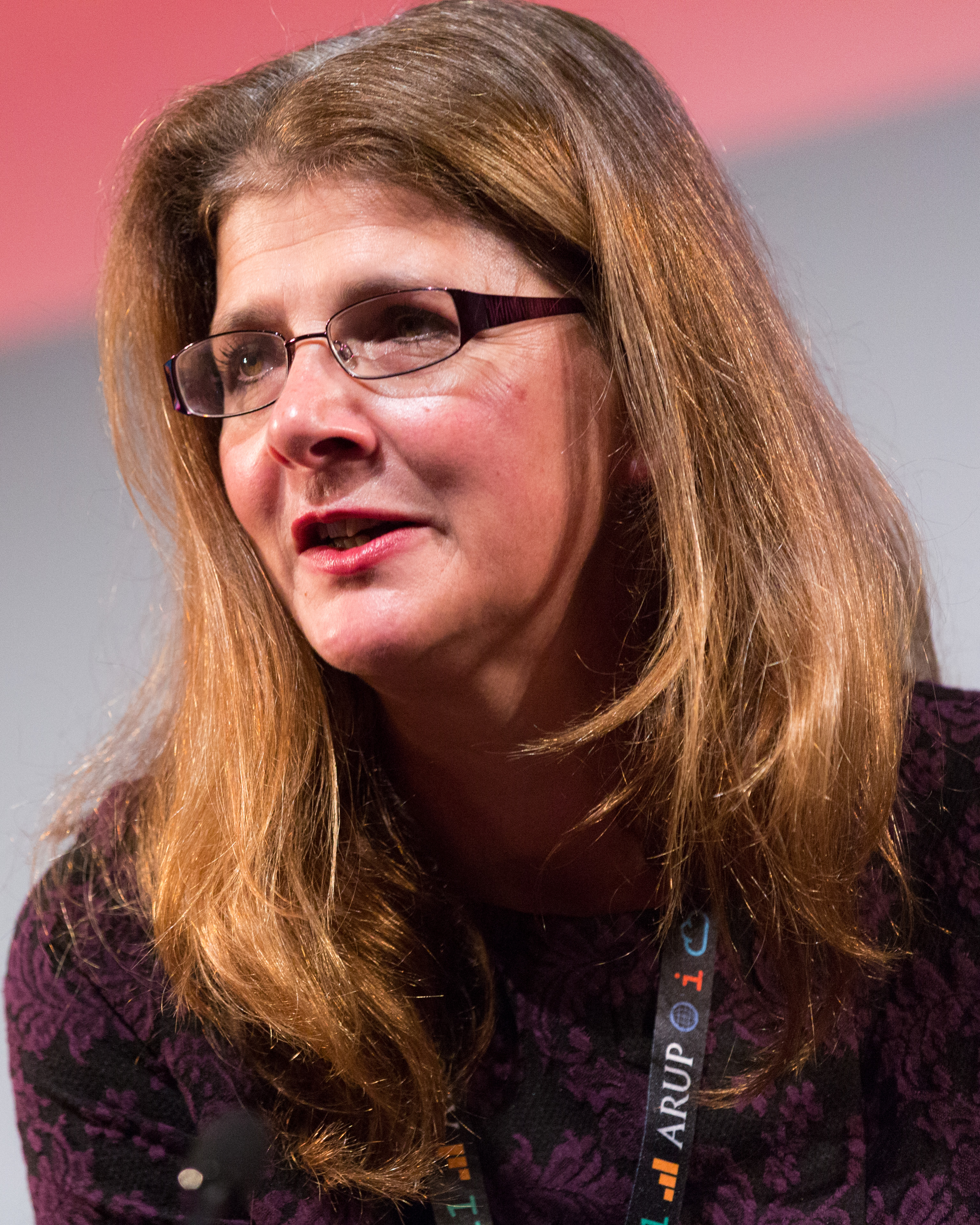
- Born: 1963 (age 62–63)
- Occupation: statistician
- Known for: former chair of the United Kingdom government's Open Data User Group

Heather Jane Savory (born 1963) is a British former chair of the Chair of the Open Data User Group. She has been the deputy national statistician and Director General for Data Capability at the Office for National Statistics and worked on Big Data for the United Nations.

== Life ==
Savory was born in March 1963. As she grew up she played with Meccano and she decided as a teenager to drop humanities so she could concentrate on maths, physics, chemistry and languages. Everyone else who was studying both maths and physics at her school was a boy. Her qualifications gained her a place at Loughborough University of Technology where she graduated with a first class honours degree in Electronic and Electrical Engineering.

After Loughborough she joined the General Electric Company where she began work designing semi conductors. She was at 3D Labs when they designed their first graphics chip. She remembers the joy as the chip they had designed was manufactured and was then soldered to a printed circuit board. It worked and in 1996 3D labs was floated on NASDAQ and it was bought out by Intel in 2012.

She later took an MBA at the London Business School in 2004.

In 2012 she was appointed to be Chair of the Open Data User Group by Francis Maude. The group's role was to advise the UK government on what data should be released.

In 2016 Savory began work the United Nations representing the UK Office for National Statistics. She was co-chair and led a team looking at the opportunities created by the exploitation of Big Data to improve the UN's delivery of the 2030 sustainable development goals.

In 2020 she left the position of Deputy National Statistician at the British Office for National Statistics to serve with the United Nations Working Group on Big Data for Official Statistics – GWG. This role enables the UN to encourage the exchange of data and methods across the globe.
