= Heather Purser =

Native American LGBT advocate

Heather Purser is an LGBT advocate, diver, and member of the Suquamish tribe in Seattle, Washington. She is known for pioneering same-sex marriage rights for her tribe, making the Suquamish tribe the second Native American tribe to amend their laws to recognize same-sex marriage, the first being the Oregon Coquille tribe. Purser is openly lesbian and came out during her teens.

== Same-sex marriage ==
Around 2009, Purser began approaching her tribal leaders to ask them about recognizing same-sex marriage, making her the first to do so within her tribe. She did not seek assistance for her efforts, as she worried that others were unconcerned with same-sex marriage rights and would not be interested in helping her. In March 2011, Purser attended a tribal meeting where approximately 300 of her fellow tribes people were in attendance to again ask for recognition of same-sex marriage. Her request was met with an "enthusiastic yes", which led to tribe officials unanimously voting to legally recognize same-sex marriage in August 2011.

For her efforts, Purser was recognized by Seattle mayor Michael McGinn during the city's annual Human Rights day celebration on February 16, 2012. A month prior, Washington state Governor Christine Gregoire heralded Purser as a role model and inspiration. Gregoire would later use Purser's story during a 2012 news conference to introduce similar legislation for the state of Washington. Purser was invited to the conference and was able to speak with the governor. Later that year, the Greater Seattle Business Association (GBSA) granted Purser the Business and Humanitarian award for "voice of social justice."
