= Heather Owens =

American professional wrestler

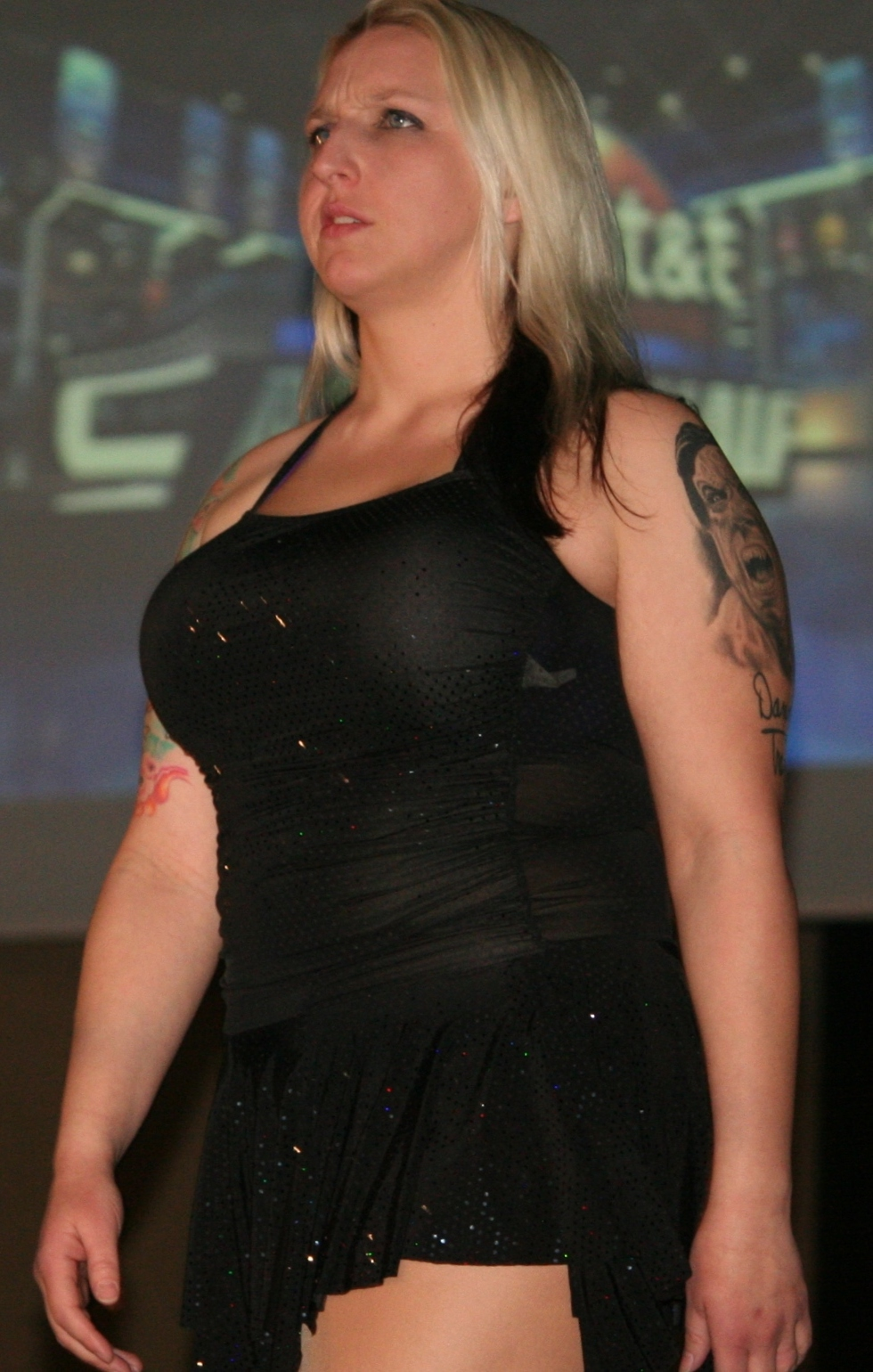

Personal information
- Born: Heather Owens; December 3, 1983 (age 42) Cincinnati, Ohio, U.S.

Professional wrestling career
- Ring name(s): Heather Owens; Azul la Flor; Heather Gonzales; Malo Pescado
- Billed height: 5 ft 4 in (1.63 m)
- Billed weight: 150 lb (68 kg)
- Billed from: Bon Temps, Louisiana; Cincinnati, Ohio
- Trained by: Cody Hawk; Les Thatcher
- Debut: 2006
- Retired: February 2, 2019

Heather Owens (born December 3, 1983) is an American former professional wrestler, who performed for several Midwest United States-based independent promotions.

== Professional wrestling career ==
Right out of high school, Heather Owens began her training at Les Thatcher's Main Event Pro Wrestling Camp in Evendale, Ohio in 2002. After only a few months, she left for personal reasons. In May 2005, Owens returned to the wrestling ring and started training under Ronnie Longworth at Queen City Wrestling in Mt. Healthy, Ohio. She was only training for a few months before she became a referee. She left Queen City Wrestling in December 2005 and went back to Heartland Wrestling Association (HWA) to train under Cody Hawk.

=== Heartland Wrestling Association (2005–2007) ===
On December 30, 2005, Owens defeated 70+ men and women in her first match at the HWA World War III Battle Royal, one being veteran Helena Heavenly, which lead to Owens first singles bout. Though Owens fought hard, she was no match for Heavenly at HWA "Cold As Ice" on January 21, 2006.

Owens went on wrestling and refereeing for HWA all through 2006 in which she wrestled both females and males. Her biggest feud was with Nevaeh. On March 10, 2007, Owens defeated Nevaeh in a bloody "Leather, Whips, & Chains" match at HWA "Cyber Clash 2.0".

=== World Wrestling Coalition (2009–present) ===
On March 14, 2009, Owens debuted in a singles bout against Super Oprah at "King of Extreme" in Aberdeen, Ohio where she won with a tornado DDT. She feuded off and on with Kara Kildare through 2009 but on February 13, 2010, Owens masked herself and became known as "Malo Pescado" so she could wrestle guys. Finally on October 9, 2010, Malo unmasked herself in a match against Eddie Gonzales and got the win.

After months of proving that she can be a part of the men's division, Owens got a shot at the WWC North American Championship which was being held by Jimmy Mallory. During the match, Owens faked an injury and while the ref was checking on her, Eddie Gonzales hit Mallory with the belt and Heather picked up the victory and the belt. Owens is the first woman to hold the World Wrestling Coalition North American Championship.

=== Unstoppable Wrestling Alliance (2010–present) ===
Owens made a huge impact with her debut win against Mary Elizabeth Monroe and AJ Sparx while tagging with Natasha Star on April 20, 2010 in Middletown, Ohio. After only a few weeks being there, she captured the XVW Open Gender Tag Team Championship with Eddie Gonzales. They held on to the belts until August 10, 2010. After deciding to go the singles route, Owens captured the XVW Women's Championship from Mary Elizabeth Monroe on August 31, 2010 in Middletown. Xtreme Valley Wrestling was renamed Unstoppable Wrestling Alliance on September 28, 2010 and Owens was still the Women's Champion.

=== Independent circuit (2006–present) ===
Owens has wrestled in many independent federations in the Midwest throughout 2006 to present including IWA Mid-South, Far North Wrestling (FNW), and Covey Pro. In 2006, Owens wrestled in IWA Mid-South against Mickie Knuckles for the IWA & NWA Women's Titles losing both bouts.

On June 19, 2011, Owens beat Mary Elizabeth Monroe in Georgetown, KY for the United Wrestling Alliance (UWA) Vixen's Championship.

In June 2006, Owens quit her full-time job to pursue wrestling and traveled with Tracy Smothers. After a short stay in Nashville, TN with Smothers, Owens returned home where she continued wrestling locally.

== Personal life ==
In high school, she played basketball, softball, volleyball, and soccer. Owens also graduated with honors.

On October 13, 2007, Owens married fellow professional wrestler Eddie Gonzales in a wrestling ring in Dayton, Ohio.

Owens supports many animal organizations including the United Coalition for Animals Nonprofit Spay/Neuter Clinic (UCAN) and Stray Animal Adoption Program (SAAP).

Owens retired from active competition on February 2, 2019 after her final match at the WAR Anniversary Show

Heather currently hosts the "Best Friend Show Podcast" with her best friend of twenty years, Jade Attanasio-Wagel and Pop Drunk with her husband, Ed Gonzales.

== Championships and accomplishments ==
*Heartland Wrestling Association

  - HWA World War III Battle Royal Winner (2005)
  - HWA Woman of the Year (2006)
- Unstoppable Wrestling Alliance
  - XVW Open Gender Tag Team Championship (1 time) – with Eddie Gonzales[13]
  - XVW Women's Championship (1 time)
- United Wrestling Alliance/United Wrestling Federation
  - Vixen's Championship (7 times)
- World Wrestling Coalition
  - WWC North American Championship (1 time)
- 304 Wrestling
  - Women's Championship (1 time)
- WAR
  - WAR Women's Championship (2 times)
- Heroes & Legends Wrestling
  - HLW Women's Championship (1 time)
