= Heather Patrick =

American physicist

- Education: Massachusetts Institute of Technology (BS); University of Colorado Boulder (PhD)
- Scientific career
- Fields: Physics; Metrology
- Workplaces: United States Naval Research Laboratory; National Institute of Standards and Technology
- Doctoral advisor: Sarah L. Gilbert

Heather Jean Patrick is an American physicist. She is a researcher and project lead at National Institute of Standards and Technology. Patrick's research focuses on applications of scattering and reflectance measurements, advanced light sources, and robotics to the characterization and metrology of optical materials.

== Education ==
Patrick completed a B.S. in physics from the MIT Physics Department. Her 1988 undergraduate thesis was titled Reduction of amplitude fluctuations in a laser diode pumped Nd:YAG ring laser. Her academic advisor was Andrew D. Jeffries. Patrick earned a Ph.D. in physics at University of Colorado Boulder. Her 1995 dissertation was titled Dynamics of ultraviolet-light-induced refractive index changes in germanium-doped optical fiber. Patrick's doctoral advisor was Sarah L. Gilbert.

== Career ==
From 1991 to 1995, Patrick worked at NIST Boulder Laboratories. She was at the United States Naval Research Laboratory from 1995 to 2000. Patrick worked at Optinel Systems, Inc. in Elkridge, Maryland from 2001 to 2004. Since 2005, Patrick works at the National Institute of Standards and Technology in Gaithersburg, Maryland. She is the project lead on the Robotic Optical Scatter Instrument (ROSI), a NIST facility for ultraviolet to shortwave infrared spectral and angle-resolved reflectance and scattering measurements. Patrick won the Judson C. French Award in 2018 for her contributions to developing ROSI.

Patrick's research focuses on applications of scattering and reflectance measurements, advanced light sources, and robotics to the characterization and metrology of optical materials.
