= Heather Stott =

English weather forecaster

Heather Stott is an English weather forecaster and presented the weather forecasts on BBC North West Today until 2012.

Born in Macclesfield, Cheshire Stott originally trained as a journalist in Newcastle upon Tyne and worked part-time for the Newcastle hospital radio station Radio Tyneside. After graduating, she joined the BBC in Manchester as a programme researcher for local radio and television. Her first television appearance came after completing her studies at the Met Office College in Berkshire, becoming BBC North West's second on-screen weather presenter in 1998. Around the same time, Stott began co-presenting the BBC Radio Manchester (previously BBC GMR) breakfast show.

Stott joined Channel M Television (Manchester's television channel) in 2006 as co-anchor in the nightly news programme with Andy Crane. She left the following year.

Until 2012, Stott was the regular weather presenter for BBC North West Today breakfast and lunchtime bulletins. She also presented a mid-morning show on BBC Radio Manchester.

In November 2009, Stott invited her radio listeners to sponsor her to shave her head, raising money for BBC Children In Need. Her hair was shaved off during the live evening programme North West Tonight on Friday 20 November.

Stott is famous for using the term 'sunshine and showers' in almost every weather forecast she presents.

== Personal life ==
Stott was announced as leaving BBC North West on 26 October 2012, returning to Australia (Brisbane). She had lived in Macclesfield with her four children and husband, Ian (a dentist). She previously lived in Australia before returning to the UK in 2003.

Before her career in media, Stott was cabin crew for a major UK airline and is also a qualified nurse, and has previously worked in a hospital Accident and Emergency department.
