= Heather Carroll =

Canadian/British multidisciplinary artist

- Born: Manchester, England, UK
- Education: University of Toronto
- Website: https://www.stonedreams.org/

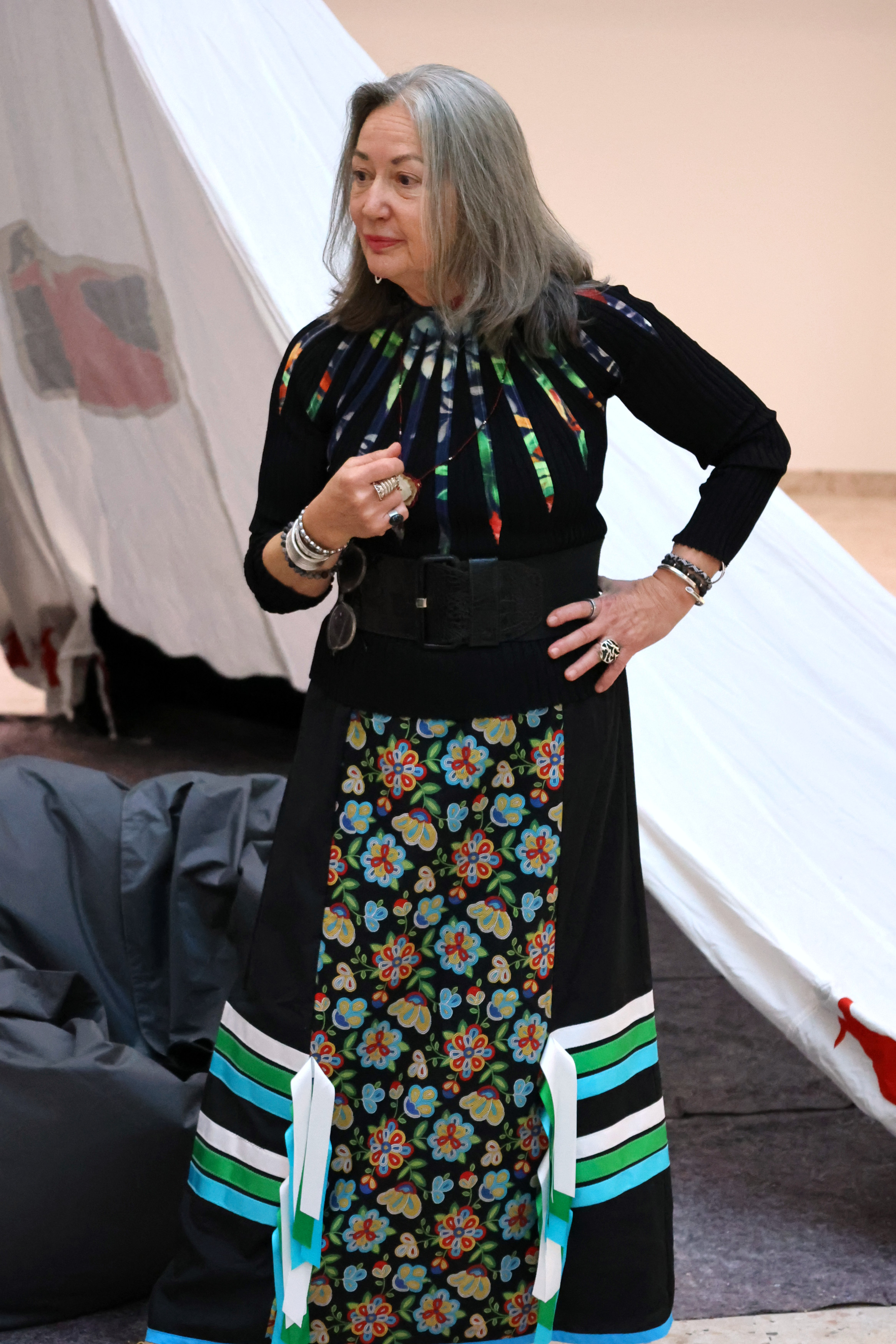
Heather Carroll (2023)

Heather Carroll is a Canadian/British multi-disciplinary artist who works primarily with engravings, relief printing, monotype, stone sculpting, serigraphy, and weaving.

She also works in the design, organization, and conducting of creative workshops for children and adults.

== Biography ==
Born in Manchester, England, UK, in 1956 to Canadian and Scottish parents, Heather Carroll is a Kablunangajuk of Inuit, Innu, Scottish, and other European origin. In 1977, she completed her Bachelor of Arts degree at the School of Fine Arts at the University of Toronto. From 1983 to 1988, she pursued a career as a graphic artist and illustrator in Barbados with her company, Lâché, during which time she also gave courses in advertising design at the Barbados Community College. In 1988, she moved to Brussels, Belgium where she worked as a freelance graphic artist. In 1989, she moved to Canada where she began her work in engravings in her studio in Montreal, Quebec. In 1990, Heather Carroll relocated to Luxembourg where she has continued with her artwork and career as a multi-disciplinary artist, art instructor and lecturer.

== Artwork ==
She has been based in Luxembourg since 2000. She has exhibited in Luxembourg, Belgium, France, Germany, the Caribbean, Canada, the United States, and China.

Her work focuses on the land of her ancestors and family, animals, the environment and the problems that threaten to change their lives forever.

She has monumental sculptures located throughout Luxembourg and France and has regularly participated in sculpture symposiums from 2004, 2005, and 2008 in Luxembourg, and 2007 in Rodemack, France. Her last symposiums took place in Lunéville, France, in May 2013 and in Luxembourg in August of the same year.

Carroll was commissioned by Canada's ambassador to the Netherlands to create a 5-tonne, 3.5-meter Inukshuk. This sculpture was donated to the International Criminal Court in The Hague and inaugurated on 7 March 2018. She was also commissioned by the Canadian Embassy to create an Inukshuk for the city of Lahr, Germany for Canada's 150th anniversary, which is on display on the square in front of the city's train station.

=== Public sculptures ===
Title	Year	Location	City	Country	GPS Coordinates
"Anuri" ("The Wind")	2005	24 Rue de la Gare	Troisvierges	Luxembourg	50.119113, 5.992234
"Dei Glecklechen Hieschen" ("The Happy Rabbit")	2006	Ecole Préscolaire (Pre-School)	Ermsdorf	Luxembourg	49.830598, 6.215267
"Creatures in the Wood"	2006	Am Brill Sentier Nature (Start of walk located at 25 Rue de la Forêt, Map of path available here.)	Schifflange	Luxembourg	49.502629, 6.008231
"La Licorne" ("The Unicorn")	2007	13 Rue Général de Gaulle	Cattenom	France	49.406058, 6.241608
"Le Fossile" ("The Fossil")	2012	3 Bunte Wee	Ermsdorf	Luxembourg	49.830466, 6.217894
"The Fallen"	2017	Canadian Passchendaele Memorial Garden	Zonnebeke	Belgium	50.870000, 2.990153
"Inuksuk"	2018	Lahr Train Station	Lahr	Germany	48.340050, 7.836055
"Inuksuk"	2018	International Criminal Court	The Hague	Netherlands	52.105849, 4.319767
"Inuksuk"	2025	Orminiou 34	Athens	Greece	37.974594, 23.752280

=== Main exhibitions ===
Year	Exhibition	City	Country
2014-2015	Stonedreams, Mierscher Kulturhaus	Mersch	Luxembourg
2012-2014	29^{e}, 30^{e}, 31^{e} Rencontre internationale de sculpture	Hettange-Grande	France
2014	Plus Semblable que Différents, échange culturel Luxembourg-Turquie, abbaye de Neumünster	Neumünster	Luxembourg
2013	Tuttukinuk, exposition personelle, Ute’s Galerie & Studio	Schrondweiler	Luxembourg
2013	Symposium de la Sculpture, Gare Art Festival	Luxembourg City	Luxembourg
2013	National Aboriginal Fashion Week, défilé de mode	Regina, Saskatchewan	Canada
2013	Symposium de la Sculpture	Lunéville	France
2012	Wege zu Kunst & Religion, Blaue Galerie	Schönecken	Germany
2010	Ecrire avec la Pierre, La Sculpture Inuit de Baker Lake, Installation Inukshuk, Bibliotheca Wittockiana	Brussels	Belgium
2009	Guanlan Print Festival	Shenzhen	China
2008	Lectures et Sculptures du Canada, Université libre de Bruxelles	Brussels	Belgium
2007	Lancaster Great House – Portes Ouvertes, exposition collective	St. James Parish	Barbados
2007	Sculpture dans la Rue, Sculpture monumentale	Rodemack	France
2005	Exposition Carroll, Parlement européen	Strasbourg	France
2005	Europa tot in uw bed, Infopunt Europa	Antwerp	Belgium
2004	Femmes et Fleurs, Floating World Gallery	Tulsa, Oklahoma	USA
2002	« Strictly Sculpture », Gelabert Studio Gallery	New York	USA
