= Heather Brandt =

American behavioural scientist

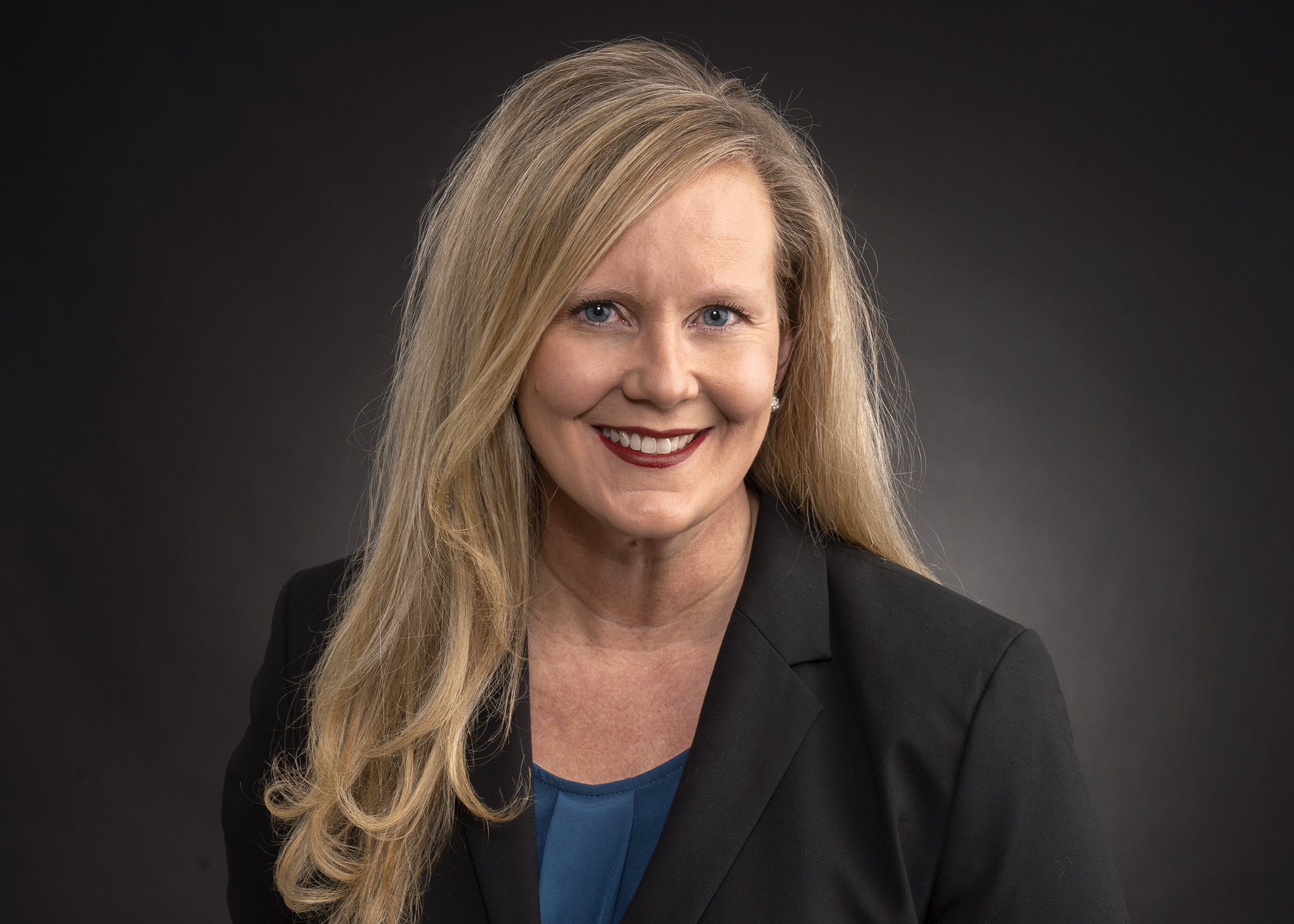
- Heather Brandt in 2021
- Born: Fairbank, Iowa, USA
- Spouses: Forrest Alton; Jeremy Ohl (m. 2000, divorced)

Academic background
- Education: BS, political science, University of Iowa; MSPH, PhD, University of South Carolina

Academic work
- Institutions: St. Jude Children's Research Hospital; Arnold School of Public Health at the University of South Carolina
- Main interests: HPV vaccine

Heather M. Brandt is an American behavioral scientist. In 2020, Brandt was appointed Director of the St. Jude Children's Research Hospital HPV Cancer Prevention Program and Co-Associate Director of Outreach for the St. Jude Comprehensive Cancer Center. Brandt’s research examines, describes, and intervenes to address cancer-related health disparities with the “community".

== Early life and education ==
Brandt was born to parents Gene and Patty Brandt in Fairbank, Iowa. When her mother joined the staff of a gynecology clinic as a transcriptionist, she inspired Brandt to pursue a career in women's health. She attended the University of Iowa where she majored in political science but was encouraged by her mentor to attend the University of South Carolina (UofSC) for graduate and doctoral degrees in public health. As a doctoral student at UofSC, Brandt married Pepsi-Cola employee Jeremy Ohl.

== Career ==
After graduating from UofSC, Brandt was employed as a research associate at the University of South Carolina's Prevention Research Center. As an associate professor in the Arnold School's Department of Health Promotion, Education, and Behavior, Brandt was the recipient of the 2014 TWIN Award from the Palmetto Center for Women in recognition of her "outstanding achievements". Two years later, she was appointed the inaugural Associate Dean for Professional Development. While serving in this role, she also served as a member of the American Cancer Society and CDC’s joint National HPV Vaccination Roundtable, co-founded and co-chaired Cervical Cancer-Free South Carolina, co-led a workgroup on HPV vaccination as part of the Cancer Prevention and Control Research Network, and was a board member of the South Carolina Cervical Cancer Awareness Initiative. Brandt also collaborated with the South Carolina Coalition for Healthy Families to get the Cervical Cancer Prevention Act of 2016 passed to "increase educational efforts about HPV vaccination and increase access to HPV vaccination for adolescents who are medically underserved." Brandt also collaborated with her second husband, Forrest Alton, and established 1000 Feathers, a consulting firm.

In 2017, Brandt was appointed to the editorial board of the American Journal of Public Health. The following year, she was the recipient of the J. Marion Sims Award for her contributions to the field of public health. In 2020, Brandt left UofSC and was appointed Director of the St. Jude Children's Research Hospital HPV Cancer Prevention Program and Co-Associate Director of Outreach for the St. Jude Comprehensive Cancer Center.
