= Heather Campbell (artist) =

Canadian Inuit artist (born 1973)

Heather Campbell (born 1973) is an Inuk artist, curator, and educator from Rigolet, Nunatsiavut, Newfoundland and Labrador. She is known for her intricate works that blend traditional and contemporary elements, exploring themes of identity, humanity's relationship with nature, and environmental concerns. Throughout her career, Campbell has worked to support Inuit artists and amplify their voices through curatorial and educational initiatives, including her current role as the Director of Strategic Initiatives at the Inuit Art Foundation.

== Early life ==
Heather Campbell was born in Rigolet, Nunatsiavut, the southernmost Inuit region in Canada, where she grew up surrounded by a blend of Inuit and settler cultures. Summers spent at her family cabin, berry picking, and experiencing the Arctic landscape shaped her deep connection to the natural world and her cultural identity.

Her grandmother, Evelyn Campbell (Shiwak), a residential school survivor and one of Canada’s first Inuit teachers, had a profound influence on Heather. Evelyn dedicated 37 years to teaching and served as the principal of the school in Rigolet, Labrador. Beyond her role in education, she took on numerous responsibilities, including acting as the designated medical supplies person in her hometown and providing treatment to patients. Evelyn's commitment to her community and her emphasis on the importance of education inspired Heather to envision opportunities beyond her community and pursue her aspirations.

Campbell earned a Bachelor of Fine Arts degree from Wilfred Grenfell College of Fine Art at Memorial University of Newfoundland in 1996. Her educational background laid the foundation for her artistic practice and curatorial career.

== Career ==
The same year that Campbell graduated from college, she exhibited her work in the 1996 Graduating Show at the Sir Wilfred Grenfell College Art Gallery in Corner Brook, Newfoundland. This was her first major exhibition after completing her formal education.

Following her graduation, Campbell worked as a curator with Indigenous and Northern Affairs Canada, where she played a key role in organizing exhibitions and promoting Inuit art. Her career highlights include curating at Indigenous and Northern Affairs Canada and contributing to the curatorial work behind the Sakahan exhibition at the National Gallery of Canada in 2013. Recognized as one of the most significant showcases of contemporary Indigenous art globally, Campbell’s work with the exhibition was a major milestone. Additionally, she has also collaborated with Inuit Tapiriit Kanatami.

Alongside her curatorial work, Campbell has been, and continues to be, a central figure at the Inuit Art Foundation, currently serving as their Strategic Initiatives Director.

== Style and techniques ==
Heather Campbell’s art practice spans painting, drawing, photography, and printmaking, incorporating materials such as ink, oil, stone paper, and digital photography. Although she initially focused on oil painting, Campbell has since developed a unique technique where she drips ink and water onto paper or canvas, allowing the colors and forms to emerge organically. Once the piece is dry, she enhances the composition with pen to define clear lines, resulting in dream-like images filled with Inuit imagery.

Her work frequently features recurring motifs, including natural and anatomical forms such as berries, roots, veins, and brain synapses. These elements represent the interconnectedness of life while drawing on her personal memories and cultural heritage. Campbell places significant emphasis on connecting her art to her identity, embedding her cultural and personal experiences within her creations. Additionally, she has expressed concerns about the potential exploitation of Inuit land and the possible erosion of Inuit identity, particularly within her home region.

== Main works ==
Nuliajuk in Mourning (2018) : An acrylic painting that portrays Nuliajuk, the Inuit sea goddess, mourning the environmental destruction of the oceans. This work highlights Campbell’s exploration of the relationship between humanity and the natural world, particularly the ecological impacts of modern life.

Methylmercury (2017) : This piece features Nuliajuk being engulfed by poison, symbolizing the ecological threats to marine ecosystems, specifically the dangers of methylmercury contamination.

Early Breakup (2013): This work was featured on the cover of the Fall/Winter 2015 edition of Inuit Art Quarterly.

== Film and media contribution ==
In 2013, Campbell directed a 15-minute documentary titled Miss Campbell: Inuk Teacher, which was produced by the National Film Board of Canada. In this documentary, Heather Campbell tells a personal story while visually incorporating her watercolor paintings and real-life photos of her family. Through this, she attempts to share the history of her grandmother, Evelyn Campbell, and her significant influence on her life and heritage.

== Exhibitions ==
=== Solo exhibitions ===
1. Café Wim – Oil paintings from 1995-1999, Sussex Drive, Ottawa, Ontario, May 1999.

=== Group exhibitions ===
1. 1996 Graduating Show – Group exhibition at the Sir Wilfred Grenfell College Art Gallery, Corner Brook, Newfoundland, 1996.
2. Cultural Industries Training Program Graduating Show – Hosted by the Inuit Art Foundation at the Canadian Museum of Civilization, Gatineau, Quebec, 1998.
3. Tracking Ten Years – Group exhibition of former graduates at Sir Wilfred Grenfell College Campus, Memorial University of Newfoundland, Corner Brook, Newfoundland, February - March 2000.
4. National Aboriginal Day Cultural Showcase – Art display and demonstrations, Victoria Island, Ottawa, ON, 2008 and 2009.
5. Contemporary Inuit Art Exhibit – Inuit Circumpolar Council General Assembly group exhibition at Katuaq Cultural Centre, Nuuk, Greenland, June/July 2010.
6. Close to home – Recent additions to the City of Ottawa’s Fine Art Collection, City of Ottawa Art Gallery, Ottawa, Ontario, July 13 to September 9, 2012.
7. Indigenous and Urban – Canadian Museum of Civilization, June 27 to September 2, 2013.
8. Nigi Mikàn - I Found It: Indigenous Women's Identity – Fall Down Gallery, in collaboration with the National Gallery of Canada and Sakahan Junior Curators program, August 2013.
9. Breaking Barriers – Diefenbunker: Canada's Cold War Museum, Carp, ON, September 2014 - January 2015.
10. SakKijajuk (Inuit Fine Art and Craft from Nunatsiavut) – Happy Valley-Goose Bay, NL, November 2015.
11. SakKijajuk (Inuit Fine Art and Craft from Nunatsiavut) – The Rooms, St. John's, NL, October 2016.
12. SakKijâjuk: Art and Craft from Nunatsiavut – Art Gallery of Nova Scotia, Halifax, NS, June 17 to September 10, 2017.
13. INSURGENCE/RESURGENCE – Winnipeg Art Gallery, Winnipeg, MB, September 22, 2017 to April 1, 2018.
14. New Murals at Ojigkwanong – Ojigkwanong Centre, Paterson Hall, Carleton University, Ottawa, ON, September 28, 2017. Featuring Carleton President Alastair J.S. Summerlee, Indigenous Liaison Officer Irvin Hill, artists Jaime Koebel, Simon Brascoupe, and Heather Campbell, Prof. Manuel Baez, and Carleton students.

== Distinctions ==
Heather Campbell’s contributions to contemporary Inuit art have earned her recognition in collections and publications. Her work is part of collections at the Canadian Museum of History, the Montreal Museum of Fine Arts, and Carleton University Art Gallery. Her piece Early Breakup (2013) was featured on the cover of the Fall/Winter 2015 edition of Inuit Art Quarterly. She has been profiled in notable publications, including Inuit in Ink: Nunatsiavut’s Heather Campbell Talks Culture and Technique.

== Bibliography ==
- Campbell, H. (n.d.). A biography of sorts and musings on Inuit art. Campbell Art. https://www.campbellart.ca/about
- Campbell, H., Baulu, K., Hartery, L., Clarke, A., Fernando, R., & National Film Board of Canada, film producer. (2023). Miss Campbell : Inuk Teacher. National Film Board of Canada. https://www.nfb.ca/film/miss-campbell-inuk-teacher/
- Inuit Art Foundation. (2017, September 14). Heather Campbell. https://www.inuitartfoundation.org/profiles/artist/Heather-Campbell
- Inuit Art Foundation. (2019, December 27). Notes from the decade - 2015. Inuit Art Foundation. https://www.inuitartfoundation.org/iaq-online/notes-from-the-decade---2015
- Miron, Kahlan. (2019, November 22). Inuit in ink: Nunatsiavut’s Heather Campbell talks culture and technique. Nunatsiaq News. https://nunatsiaq.com/stories/article/inuit-in-ink-nunatsiavuts-heather-campbell-talks-culture-and-technique/
