= Heather Manfredda =

American World Long Drive competitor

Heather (LeMaster) Manfredda (born July 16, 1986) is a World Long Drive competitor, currently residing in Shelbyville, Ky., and originally from Sacramento, Calif. Manfredda competes in events that are sanctioned by the World Long Drive Association, which is owned by Golf Channel, part of the NBC Sports Group, and a division of Comcast. The season-long schedule features events airing live on Golf Channel, culminating in the Volvik World Long Drive Championship in September.

== World Long Drive career ==
She won the 2013 Volvik World Long Drive championship in Mesquite, Nev., defeating two-time defending champion Sandra Carlborg (Sweden) in the championship match. She followed that title up with runner-up performances at each of the 2014 and 2015 WLD Championships.

In 2016 she played in the Diamond Resorts Invitational, just one of three women invited.

Manfredda also has captured Long Drive titles in Mexico, the Dominican Republic and Sweden.

== Before World Long Drive ==
Prior to competing in World Long Drive, Manfredda was a part of the women’s golf team at Sacramento State University, contributing to the team winning the Big Sky Conference championship in 2007. She additionally qualified for the 2008 and 2009 U.S. Women’s Amateur.

In addition to competing in World Long Drive, Manfredda for many years has taught golf clinics and overseen junior golf programs in an effort to inspire the next generation of golfers.

== Personal life ==
Manfredda also has taken part in numerous horse-riding competitions across the Midwest and western United States.

Her prodigious drives have also helped her earn the nickname “Longknocker.”

Manfredda has used her successful WLD career to raise thousands of dollars for charities around the world. ”I’ve found an avenue that I love and am compassionate about, because I can help raise funds and awareness for many causes.”
