= Heather Wakelee =

Professor of oncology

- Education: Princeton University; Johns Hopkins University
- Scientific career
- Workplaces: Stanford University Medical Center

Heather A. Wakelee is Deputy Director of the Stanford Cancer Institute and is the Division Chief of Medical Oncology Stanford University Medical Center. Her research focuses on lung cancer.

Wakelee received a bachelor's degree in molecular biology from Princeton University in 1992 and MD from Johns Hopkins University in 1996. She is a member of Alpha Omega Alpha. She served as an intern, as a resident in internal medicine, and as a fellow in oncology at Stanford from 1996 to 2003. She was appointed as a staff physician in 2003.

Wakelee is an author on over 180 papers related to cancer research. In 2003, she was given a Merit Award from the American Society of Clinical Oncology.

She is the lead investigator on the ECOG-ARIN clinical trials group at Stanford, and was given a Young Investigator Award from ECOG-ARIN in 2015. She serves on the board of directors of the International Association for the Study of Lung Cancer.
