= Heather Getha-Taylor =

American sociologist

Heather Getha-Taylor is a professor at the University of Kansas School of Public Affairs and Administration. Her work focuses on public and nonprofit management within the field of public administration, with emphasis on human resource management, collaboration and public service leadership.

Getha-Taylor is editor-in-chief of the journal Public Personnel Management. She served as book review editor for Public Integrity from 2015 to 2017.

== Education and academic career ==
Getha-Taylor received her bachelor's degree from Augusta State University (now Augusta University) and her master's degree from the University of Georgia. She has a PhD in Public Administration from the Maxwell School of Citizenship and Public Affairs, Syracuse University.

In September 2021, Getha-Taylor was invited to speak at her Augusta University to the Master of Public Administration program.

== Publications ==
Getha-Taylor has authored or co-authored over 60 academic works.

- H Getha-Taylor, "Identifying collaborative competencies", Review of Public Personnel Administration 28 (2), 2008, 103–119
- H Getha-Taylor, MH Holmes, WS Jacobson, RS Morse, JE Sowa, "Focusing the public leadership lens: Research propositions and questions in the Minnowbrook tradition", Journal of Public Administration Research and Theory 21 (suppl_1), 2011, i83-i97
- H Getha-Taylor, RS Morse, "Collaborative leadership development for local government officials: Exploring competencies and program impact", Public Administration Quarterly, 2013. 71–102
- PW Ingraham, H Getha-Taylor, "Leadership in the public sector: Models and assumptions for leadership development in the federal government", Review of Public Personnel Administration 24 (2), 2004, 95–112
- H Getha-Taylor, J Fowles, C Silvia, CC Merritt, "Considering the effects of time on leadership development: A local government training evaluation", Public Personnel Management 44 (3), 2015, 295–316

== Awards ==
- Steeples Service to Kansans Award, University of Kansas, 2016
- Hubert Project Fellow, University of Minnesota Humphrey School, 2017
- Honorable Mention Award, E-PARCC Teaching Case/Simulation Competition, 2018
- Faculty Teacher of the Year, KU School of Public Affairs and Administration, 2021
