= Stefan Helmreich =

Stefan Helmreich is a professor of cultural anthropology at the Massachusetts Institute of Technology. He graduated from Stanford University in 1995 with a Ph.D. in anthropology. He is also the author (and co-author) of Silicon Second Nature, Alien Ocean, and Sounding the Limits of Life. In 2003 he released an album of experimental music entitled Xerophonics: Copying Machine Music on Seeland Records. He specializes in the anthropology of scientists - specifically oceanographers. He won the Guggenheim Fellowship for Social Sciences, US & Canada in 2018. Helmreich was also a Radcliffe Fellow starting in 2018. He is married to Heather Paxson a cultural anthropologist of food and family.
