= Heather Gemmen Wilson =

Canadian writer (born 1971)

Heather Gemmen
- Born: 4 April 1971 (age 55); Ontario, Canada
- Occupations: Author; editor; speaker
- Writing career
- Genres: Memoir, Children's literature
- Notable work: Startling Beauty

Heather Gemmen (born 4 April 1971) is a Canadian author and editor of children's books.

She is best known for her memoir, Startling Beauty. In this book, she describes becoming pregnant after being sexually assaulted while living and working for community development and racial reconciliation in the inner city. It describes her struggle with the decision to not only carry the baby to term but raise it as her own instead of having an abortion.

Gemmen is an international speaker, opposing abortion and advocating for racial reconciliation, and Christian spiritual growth. Her works have been translated into more than ten languages.

== Biography ==
Heather Gemmen grew up on a hobby farm in Canada. Her father and mother, both immigrants from the Netherlands, were Christians who opened their home to children in the foster care system—some of whom still claim this family as their own. Gemmen's siblings by birth are all older than her. Gemmen attended a private Christian school.

She attended the Grand Rapids, Michigan university Calvin College.

Gemmen became a United States citizen in 1995. During her marriage, Gemmen gave birth to three children and adopted one other. She used her BA in English to become a professional book editor. In 2004, she and her husband divorced; Gemmen remarried a year later.

In 2004, Gemmen was an editor employed by Cook Communications Ministries and had written 50 books.

== Publications ==
- I have a friend, 2003
- That's not fair!, 2003
- Quit looking at me!, 2003
- Monsters at night, 2003
- Learn-to-read Bible, 2003
- But it's true!, 2004
- Lydia Barnes and the blood diamond treasure, 2007
