= Heather Knight (archaeologist) =

Archaeologist

Heather Knight FSA is an archaeologist who specialises in Elizabethan and Jacobean playhouses in London. She is a Senior Archaeologist at Museum of London Archaeology. Knight was elected as a fellow of the Society of Antiquaries of London on 26 June 2021.

== Selected publications ==
- Knight, H. and Pearce, J. 2017. "Post-medieval development and the local tobacco pipe industry in the late 18th/early 19th century: excavations at 5–7 Giltspur Street, City of London". London Archaeologist 15 (1), 10–17.
- Knight, H. 2013. "Excavations at Bridge Wharf, Chertsey, 2001-9". Surrey Archaeological Collections 97, 129–137. doi:10.5284/1069381
- Knight, H. 2013 "'Le Newerk of Maydeston' Excavation of a Medieval Hospital Site at St Peter's Wharf, Maidstone", Archaeologia Cantiana 133, 115–130.
- Knight, H. (ed) 2002. Aspects of medieval and later Southwark': Archaeological excavations (1991--8) for the London Underground Limited Jubilee Line Extension Project. MOLA.
