= Heather Castleden =

Canadian geographer

- Born: 1970 (age 55–56)

Academic background
- Education: BA, Anthropology and Native Studies, 1996, University of Manitoba; M.Ed, Adult and Higher Education, PhD, Human Geography, 2007, University of Alberta
- Thesis: As sacred as cedar and salmon: a collaborative study with Huu-ay-aht First Nation, British Columbia into understanding the meaning of 'resources' from an Indigenous worldview. (2007)
- Website: heclab.com

Heather Evelyn Castleden (born 1970) is a Canadian geographer. Since 2021, she has been an Impact Chair in Transformative Governance for Planetary Health at the University of Victoria. She was previously the Canada Research Chair in Reconciling Relations for Health, Environments, and Communities at Queen's University at Kingston.

== Early life and education ==
Castleden was born in 1970. She completed her Bachelor of Arts degree in anthropology and native studies at the University of Manitoba and her Master of Education and PhD at the University of Alberta. Throughout her doctorate studies, Castleden worked with Huu-ay-aht First Nations (HFN) for her thesis "As sacred as cedar and salmon: a collaborative study with Huu-ay-aht First Nation, British Columbia into understanding the meaning of 'resources' from an Indigenous worldview." She subsequently shared her research with the HFN Chief and Councilors to assist with treaty negotiations, federal court cases, and the HFN Land-use planning Team.

== Career ==
=== Dalhousie University ===
Following her PhD, Castleden became a postdoctoral fellow at the University of Victoria (UVic) before accepting a tenure-track academic position at Dalhousie University. As an assistant professor at Dalhousie, Castleden became one of the co-principal investigators for the Atlantic Aboriginal Health Research Program (AAHRP) where she worked alongside Miꞌkmaq communities in Nova Scotia to address environmental health and social justice issues. As such, Castleden was also the 2010 recipient of the Julian M. Szeicz Award from the Canadian Association of Geographers as an early career geographer who showed research achievement and career potential. She received the award in recognition of her contribution to the geography of environment, health, and Indigenous community-based research. Beyond her work with the AAHRP, Castleden was awarded a Network for End of Life Studies Interdisciplinary Capacity Enhancement New Investigator award for her project "Traditional Stories of Death and Dying: Developing a Tool Kit for Aboriginal Palliative Care." She also taught graduate courses on Indigenous Peoples, natural resource issues, and research methods.

Due to her relationship with the Miꞌkmaq community, Castleden received two grants in 2012 to work alongside the Pictou Landing First Nation Women's Association in researching the effects of pulp waste at Boat Harbour on the population. She later received a New Investigator Salary Award from the Canadian Institutes of Health Research (CIHR) to support her research as a "promising new researcher."

=== Queen's University ===
Castleden eventually left Dalhousie in 2014 to become an associate professor at Queen's University at Kingston with a joint appointment between the Department of Geography and Planning and the Department of Public Health Sciences. Within two years of joining the faculty, Castleden was appointed a Tier 2 Canada Research Chair (CRC) in Reconciling Relations for Health, Environments, and Communities. In this role, Castleden also received a grant from the CIHR to establish an interdisciplinary research program on Indigenous leadership in renewable energy development titled "SHARED Future: Achieving Strength, Health, and Autonomy through Renewable Energy Development for the Future." In 2020, Castleden received a Fulbright Fellowship to conduct a 4-month research program on SHARED at the University of Hawaiʻi at Mānoa.

=== UVic ===
Following her fellowship, Castleden left Queen's University to return to UVic as an Impact Chair in Transformative Governance for Planetary Health. At the same time, she was also elected a Fellow of the Royal Society of Canada's College of New Scholars, Artists and Scientists for her research in partnership with Indigenous peoples.

== Personal life ==
Castleden and her husband have two children together; a son and daughter.
