= Heather Barnett =

English artist and university professor

Heather Barnett is an English artist and university professor working with natural phenomena and complex systems.

== Education ==
Barnett co-leads the MA Art and Science course at University of the Arts London and also taught at the University of Westminster until 2015, also in London.

== Career ==
Working with live organisms, imaging technologies and playful pedagogies, her work explores how we observe, influence and understand the world around us. Recent work centres around nonhuman intelligence, collective behaviour and distributed knowledge systems, including The Physarum Experiments, an ongoing 'collaboration' with an intelligent slime mould; Animal Collectives collaborative research with SHOAL Group at Swansea University where she is an Honorary Research Fellow; and a series of publicly sited collective bio/social experiments, including Crowd Control and Nodes and Networks.

She is best known for her work with slime mould. and in 2014 gave a TED talk about slime mould. She is the founding member of SLIMOCO: The Slime Mould Collective, a group of scientists and artists who work with slime mould. She was also the 2014 "Artist-in-Restaurant" at the London restaurant Pied-a-Terre. For four years the restaurant has chosen an artist each year to spend time at the restaurant, eating and lingering in the working areas of the kitchen observing, and then to produce artworks reflecting the experience. She has exhibited at the Victoria & Albert Museum and the Science Museum, London.

== Publications ==
- Barnett, H. et al. (2021) The Art of Science: artists and artworks inspired by science. Welbeck Publishing Group.
- Barnett, Heather (ed) (2012); Broad Vision: Inspired by… Images from Science, University of Westminster: London
- Barnett, Heather & Smith, John R A (ed) (2011); Broad Vision: the art & science of looking, London Gallery West ISBN 0955095158
