= Heather Logghe =

American surgical researcher

- Education: University of California, San Francisco
- Employer(s): University of North Carolina at Chapel Hill; Thomas Jefferson University Hospital

Heather Logghe is a surgical research fellow at Thomas Jefferson University Hospital. She started the viral movement #ILookLikeASurgeon, a hashtag that reached over one hundred million people on Twitter.

== Early life and education ==
Logghe graduated from the University of California, San Francisco in 2011. She won the 2012 Chancellor's Award for the Advancement of Women.

== Career ==
Logghe began a surgical residency at the University of North Carolina and took two years off for research. She studied laparoscopic surgeries, and identified that laparoscopic shunt revision can avoid the complications of open revision. Logghe started the viral Twitter campaign #ILookLikeASurgeon whilst a preliminary surgical resident in October 2015. Logghe was inspired by the #ILookLikeAnEngineer campaign. The social media posts generated hundreds of millions of impressions, including the American College of Surgeons and Royal College of Surgeons as well as media outlets. In 2017 the campaign was selected as the cover of The New Yorker.

She has since published peer-reviewed papers on the evolving image of surgeons, as well as providing guidelines for surgeons' social media use. She believes Twitter can be a useful tool in advancing academic surgery. In 2017 she joined Thomas Jefferson University Hospital as a Surgical Research Fellow, looking at how social media can be used to disseminate research, medical education and patient care.
