= Heather Black (campaigner) =

Scottish campaigner (1951–2020)

Heather Black (1951 - 14 May 2020) lived in Muirhouse, Edinburgh, and is known for setting up what was then described as a groundbreaking community group SHADA (Support Help and Advice on Drug Addiction), now known as the North Edinburgh Drug and Alcohol Centre, in 1984. She introduced a needle exchange at a time when needle sharing was driving the escalation of HIV/AIDs cases in Edinburgh.

== Campaigning ==
Black worked with Muirhouse GP, Dr Roy Robertson, who was one of the first to make the link between the ban on needles and the spread of the human immunodeficiency virus. At that time Edinburgh officials were confiscating drug paraphernalia, which meant people were sharing infected needles, leading to increased cases of HIV/AIDs.

Black was vocal in treating drug use as a multifactorial issue, connected to poverty and inequality.

At an open discussion at Robertson's medical practice in 1987, Black took on a homophobic councilman proposing exiling gay people and preventing immigration to stop the spread of the virus. Furious at the politician's ignorance, Black confirmed her views that there multiple issues at play, including poverty, joblessness and a six-year wait for public housing. 'There's loads of other problems intertwined,' she said, describing gray-haired residents who have never had work and have been on the dole all their lives. 'Youth unemployment here is running over 45 percent. The central Government has never done anything about the heroin, why should we expect something from them over AIDs?'

== Death and legacy ==
Black died of oesophageal cancer on 14 May 14 2020. As a result of her experiences, her family joined forces with Dignity in Dying.
