= Azure (design magazine) =

Design magazine

AZURE Magazine
- Categories: Architecture and design
- Frequency: 4 issues per year
- Publisher: SANDOW.
- First issue: 1985
- Country: Canada
- Based in: Toronto, Ontario, Canada
- Language: English
- Website: www.azuremagazine.com

Azure is a media brand covering architecture and design published in Toronto, Ontario. Azure is described as "an indispensable resource for architects, designers and the design-savvy public" on its website. It was founded in 1985 by Nelda Rodger and Sergio Sgaramella. In 2000, it won the Canadian National Magazine Awards' Magazine of the Year. In 2026, Azure was awarded an Architectural Journalism and Media Award from the Royal Architectural Institute of Canada. In 2011, the magazine launched the AZ Awards, an international competition open to architects, landscape architects, designers, students, clients, and manufacturers. In February 2013, deputy editor Catherine Osborne was named the magazine's editor-in-chief, with founding editor Nelda Rodger remaining as editorial director for Azure Publishing. In February 2021, Elizabeth Pagliacolo was named editor-in-chief. Following a bankruptcy protection filing in September 2025, Azure was acquired by the New York-based Sandow Group in December 2025. With this acquisition, the brand is no longer Canadian-owned.
