= Heath (disambiguation) =

Heath or heathland is low-growing woody vegetation, mostly consisting of heathers and related species.

Heath or heathland may also refer to:

== Butterflies and moths ==
- the heaths, common name for the Palearctic species of the genus Coenonympha, brush-footed butterflies
  - Coenonympha pamphilus (small heath), a butterfly native to Europe, Asia except tropical India and Indochina, and Northern Africa
  - Coenonympha tullia (large heath), a butterfly native to Europe, Asia except tropical India and Indochina, and North America
- Melitaea athalia (heath fritillary), a butterfly found throughout the Palaearctic from western Europe to Japan
- Semiothisa clathrata (latticed heath), a moth found from Europe, North Africa and Asia

== Plants ==
- Heath family or heather family, Ericaceae
  - Australian heath, any of the species in the genus Epacris
  - Beard heath, any of the species in the genus Leucopogon
  - Heath, many of the species in the genus Cassiope
  - Heath, either of the two species in the genus Daboecia
  - Heath, many of the species in the genus Erica
  - Mountain heath, any of the species in the genus Phyllodoce

== Places ==
=== Ireland ===
- Heathland, County Westmeath, a townland in the civil parish of Lackan, barony of Corkaree
- The Heath, a village in County Laois

=== United Kingdom ===
- Heath (Barking and Dagenham ward), London, England
- Heath, Cardiff, Wales
  - Heath (Cardiff ward), Wales
- Heath, Derbyshire, England
- Heath, Herefordshire
- The Heath, Buxton with Lammas, a location in Norfolk
- The Heath (Hampstead Heath), a park in the City of London
- The Heath, Hevingham, a location in Norfolk
- The Heath, North Norfolk, a location in Fakenham, Norfolk
- Heath, Shropshire
- The Heath, Staffordshire
- The Heath, Suffolk, a location near Tattingstone
- Ipswich Heaths, Suffolk
- Heath Town, West Midlands
- Heath, West Yorkshire

=== United States ===
- Heath, Alabama
- Heath, Indiana
- Heath, Kentucky, involved in the Derecho and tornado outbreak of April 4–5, 2011
- Heath, Massachusetts
- Heath Township, Michigan
- Heath, Montana
- Heath, Ohio
- Heath Township, Jefferson County, Pennsylvania
- Heath, Texas

== People ==
- Heath (given name), the given name
- Heath (surname), a list of people with the surname
- Heath (musician) (Hiroshi Morie, 1968–2023), Japanese musician

== Art, entertainment, and media ==
- HEATH, an experimental literary text by Tan Lin
- Heath Brothers, an American jazz band

== Companies ==
- Allen & Heath, a manufacturer of audio mixing consoles, based in Penryn, Cornwall, UK
- D. C. Heath and Company, a publishing company in Lexington, Massachusetts, US
- Heath Ceramics, a manufacturer of ceramic tableware and tiles in Sausalito, California, US
- Heathkit, also known as Heath Company, a manufacturer of electronic kits and devices

== Schools ==
- Heath Elementary School (disambiguation)
- Heath Grammar School, Halifax, West Yorkshire, England
- Heath High School (Kentucky), US (closed in 2013)
- Heath High School (Ohio), US

== Other uses ==
- Heath v. Alabama, 478 U.S. 82 (1985), interpreting the double jeopardy clause of the Fifth Amendment to the Constitution of the United States
- Heath bar, a confection
- The Heath GAA, a Gaelic football club in County Laois, Ireland

== See also ==
- Heath station (disambiguation)
- Heath (list of places), list of places with "Heath" in their name
- Heather (disambiguation)
- Heathrow (disambiguation)
- Hoath, a place in Kent whose name is the old local dialectal form of Heath
