= List of places named Heath =

This is a list of places with "Heath" in their name:

== United Kingdom ==
- Albury Heath, a small village in Surrey, England
- Appledore Heath, a place in Kent, England
- Apse Heath, a hamlet on the Isle of Wight, England
- Ardleigh Heath, a hamlet in Essex, England
- Balsall Heath, an inner-city area of Birmingham, England
- Becontree Heath, an area of the London Borough of Barking and Dagenham, England
- Bexley Heath (more commonly spelt Bexleyheath), a town in the London Borough of Bexley, England
- Blakenall Heath, a neighbourhood in Walsall, West Midlands, England
- Bracebridge Heath, a commuter village near Lincoln, Lincolnshire, England
- Broadbridge Heath, a village in the Horsham district of West Sussex, England
- Cambridge Heath, a place in the London Borough of Tower Hamlets
- Chadwell Heath, an area in London, England
- Colney Heath, a village near St Albans, Hertfordshire, England
- Cradley Heath, a town in the Black Country, England
- Dunwich Heath, heathland in Suffolk managed by the National Trust
- Fernhill Heath, a village in Worcestershire, England
- Flackwell Heath, a village in the outskirts of High Wycombe, Buckinghamshire, England
- Forest Heath, a local government district in Suffolk, England
- Hampstead Heath, a park in London, England
- Haywards Heath, a town in West Sussex, England
- Heath, Cardiff, Wales
- Heath, Derbyshire, England
- Heath, Herefordshire, a hamlet
- Heath, Shropshire, a civil parish
- Heath Hayes, Staffordshire, England
- Heath Row, another spelling of Heathrow, a small hamlet in Middlesex, England, demolished to make way for Heathrow Airport
- Heathrow Airport, one of the main airports for London, England
- Heath Town, a district of Wolverhampton, West Midlands, England
- Hockley Heath, a village in the Metropolitan Borough of Solihull, West Midlands, England
- Holt Heath, Worcestershire, a village in Worcestershire, England
- Hopton Heath, a village in Shropshire, England
- Hounslow Heath, a nature reserve in London, England
- Kelling Heath, an area on the north Norfolk coast, England
- Kings Heath, a suburb of Birmingham, England
- Little Heath (disambiguation), one of several places in England
- Locks Heath, a residential suburb of Fareham, Hampshire, England
- Martlesham Heath, a village near Ipswich, Suffolk, England
- Mousehold Heath, an area of heathland and woodland near Norwich, England
- Newton Heath, a district in the city of Manchester, England
- Northumberland Heath, a neighbourhood within the London Borough of Bexley
- Penenden Heath, a suburb in the town of Maidstone in Kent, England
- Rode Heath, a village in Cheshire, England
- Row Heath, hamlet in Essex
- Short Heath (disambiguation), one of several places
- Small Heath, Birmingham, England
- Stockton Heath, a village in Cheshire, England
- Surrey Heath, a local government district in Surrey, England
- Talbot Heath, a heath in Bournemouth, Dorset
- Therfield Heath, a Nature Reserve near Therfield, Hertfordshire, England
- Thornton Heath, a district in the London Borough of Croydon
- Wall Heath, a village on the western fringe of the Black Country, England
- Washwood Heath, an area of Birmingham, England
- West Heath (disambiguation), one of several places in England
- Whitacre Heath, a village in Warwickshire, England
- Wrotham Heath, a small village in Kent, England

== United States ==
- Heath, Alabama
- Heath Place, California
- White Heath, Illinois
- Heath, Indiana
- Heath, Massachusetts
- Heath, Ohio
- Heath, Texas
- Heath Township (disambiguation) (two townships)

== Denmark ==
- Heath, Kongenshus
- Heath, Harrild

== Elsewhere ==
- Heath River, on the border between Peru and Bolivia
- Lüneburg Heath (German: Lüneburger Heide), a region in Lower Saxony, Germany

== See also ==
- Blackheath (disambiguation), a number of places
- Heath (disambiguation)
- Heathfield (disambiguation), a number of places
