= Heather =

Heather or Heathers may refer to:

== Plants ==
- The heather family, or Ericaceae, particularly:
  - Common heather or ling, Calluna
  - Various species of the genus Cassiope
  - Various species of the genus Erica

== Name ==
- Heather (given name)
- Heather (surname)

== Arts and media ==
- Heather (film), a 1938 Polish film directed by Juliusz Gardan
- Heathers, a 1989 American film directed by Michael Lehmann
  - Heathers: The Musical, a musical by Laurence O'Keefe based on the film
  - Heathers (TV series), a 2018 television series based on the film
- "Heather" (The Secret Circle), a television episode

=== Music ===
- Heathers (band), an acoustic singing duo from Ireland
- "Heather" (Beatles song), an unreleased 1968 song by Paul McCartney and Donovan
- "Heather" (Conan Gray song), a 2020 song by American singer Conan Gray
- "Heather", a song from fusion drummer Billy Cobham's 1974 album Crosswinds
- "Heather", a 2001 song by Paul McCartney from the album Driving Rain
- "Heather", a song from Patent Pending by Heavens
- "Heather", a version of the Johnny Pearson song, "Autumn Reverie", which appeared on the Carpenters album Now & Then
- ”Heather”, a song from I Know Leopard’s album Love is a Landmine
- "Heather", a song from I Love You, I'm Trying by Grandson

== Places ==
- Heather, Leicestershire, a village in England
  - Heather Preceptory, a preceptory of the Knights Hospitaller, established in the above village
  - Heather St John's Football Club, an English football club based in the above village
- Heather, Missouri, a community in the United States
- Heather, Washington, an unincorporated community in the United States

== Ships ==
- Heather (yacht), the original name of the yacht USS Sea Gull, built in 1902
- HMS Heather, two ships of the Royal Navy

== Other uses ==
- Heather (fabric), interwoven yarns of mixed colours producing muted greyish shades with flecks of colour
- Heather, brand name of a progestogen-only pill containing norethisterone (norethindrone)

== See also ==
- Heath (disambiguation)
- Heather Hills (disambiguation)
- Hurricane Heather
