= Overseal =

Village in Derbyshire, England

Coordinates: 52.735°N 1.565°W

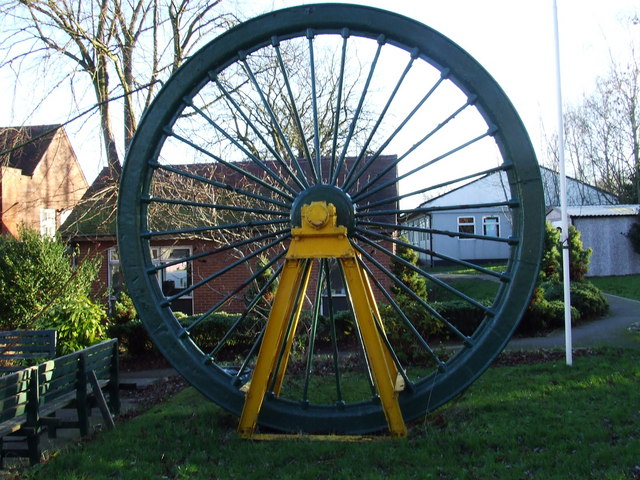
- Overseal Primary School. This colliery winding wheel is from Donisthorpe colliery, the last deep mine in South Derbyshire.

- Location within Derbyshire
- Population: 2,450 (2011)
- OS grid reference: SK294153
- District: South Derbyshire
- Shire county: Derbyshire
- Region: East Midlands
- Country: England
- Sovereign state: United Kingdom
- Post town: SWADLINCOTE
- Postcode district: DE12
- Police: Derbyshire
- Fire: Derbyshire
- Ambulance: East Midlands

Overseal is a village and civil parish in South Derbyshire district of Derbyshire, England. It is 3 miles (4.8 km) south of Swadlincote, 5 miles (8.0 km) west of Ashby-de-la-Zouch and 13 miles (21 km) south-southwest of Derby. It had a population of the civil parish at the 2011 census was 2,450. Situated within the National Forest area, it is near the villages of Netherseal and Lullington as well as being close to the border with Leicestershire. It is one of the southernmost settlements in Derbyshire.

Historically both Overseal and Netherseal were part of Leicestershire: they were transferred from Leicestershire to Derbyshire in 1897, in return for Leicestershire absorbing several of Derbyshire's enclaves (see county enclaves).

== Geography ==
The village was once part of the district of Seal, which included a number of settlements, many of which form Netherseal and Overseal in modern times. Seal suggests the area was once heavily forested and Nether means "lower" and Over means "upper". The small hamlet of Seale is approximately 1 mile (1.6 km) south of the village, marking the border with Leicestershire near Acresford. The busy A444 national route bisects the village, with Burton upon Trent 7 miles (11 km) to the northwest and Nuneaton some 18 miles (29 km) to the south. The M42 motorway is accessible 3 miles (4.8 km) to the southeast.

Overseal is located very close to the furthest point from mainland Britain's coast, at Church Flatts Farm near Coton-in-the-Elms (grid reference SK253144), approximately 3 miles to the west. Overseal was said to be the 'population centre of Britain' in 1971 with an equal number of people living north and south of it, and similarly for east and west. However, this centre has slowly been moving southwards and is now claimed by the nearby village of Appleby Parva in North West Leicestershire, 5 miles (8.0 km) south of the village.

Overseal is in the heart of the National Forest. To the southeast is the former mining village of Donisthorpe in Leicestershire. Halfway between the village and Moira, less than a mile to the east, is the Conkers activity park, the National Forest youth hostel and a Camping and Caravanning Club site all in Leicestershire, close by also to the hamlet of Short Heath (in Derbyshire). The village was part of West Goscote Hundred in Leicestershire for most of its history. In 1889 it was transferred, along with Netherseal, to Derbyshire in exchange for Chilcote, Donisthorpe, Measham, Oakthorpe, Stretton-en-le-Field and Willesley plus the Derbyshire parts of Appleby Magna, Packington and Ravenstone.

Woodville Road, leading to the northeast from the A444, was formerly the B5004, but has now been downgraded to a minor road. Close by is the former Ashby and Nuneaton Joint Railway became the Leicester to Burton line, with a station for Overseal and Moira. There was also a small two-road loco depot, a sub-shed of nearby Burton which was coded 16F. The depot was closed in the late 1960s.

There is only one pub in the village, the Robin Hood Inn at the junction of Main Street and Burton Road (A444). The Navigation Inn on Spring Cottage Road in Leicestershire was demolished in 2015 to make way for elderly accommodation lodges. There is a small Co-op supermarket on the north side of the village on the A444, next to a Chinese takeaway.

== History ==
Overseal's history is inseparable from the nearby village of Netherseal. Historically forming a single parish and township, the two settlements have been known by various names, with Overseal having been known as, amongst others, Little Seale and Spital Seile and with variations on Seal including Seile, Sela, Sheile, Seeyle.

During the reign of Henry III, the manors of Overseal and Netherseal were given by William de Meisham (along with a park, a wood and a mill), as a dowry for his daughter, Godehouda, on the occasion of her marriage to William de Appleby of Appleby Magna. The manor house itself was located in what is now Netherseal. Around 1250, William de Meisaham also gave care of the church to Merevale Abbey near Atherstone, Warwickshire.

Around the turn of the 16th century, the Manor, Netherseal Hall, had passed to the Gresley Family of Drakelow, having been purchased by Sir William Gresley (father of Sir George Gresley, 1st Baronet). The Gresley family sold the manor to the Morewood family in 1627. However, the manor passed back to the Gresley family through the marriage of Sir Thomas Gresley, 2nd Baronet, to Francis Morewood. In 1569 Sir Thomas Gresley, 2nd Baronet, is listed as Lord of the Manor, with the Manor itself being tenanted to E.W. Robertson, Esq.

In 1863 the manorial rights are recorded as belonging to Thomas Mowbray Esq. of Grange Wood House (later Grangewood Hall), which was around a mile southwest of Overseal. He did not, however, own all the land in the village; John Curzon Esq. was listed as a major landholder, with the rest shared between smaller owners.

=== Churches ===
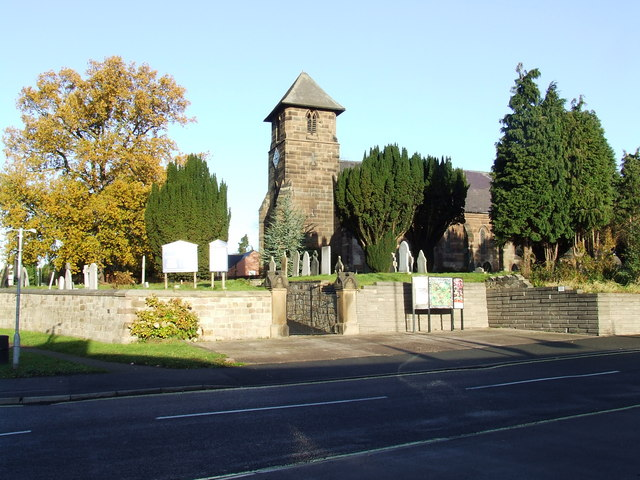
St Matthew's Church

The village church is dedicated to St Matthew. There appears to have been an earlier church in Overseal; however, in 1622 this was reported as being "quite decayed and gone". A new church ("Chapel of Ease") was built in 1840–1841, on land donated by Elizabeth Pycroft, who also gave money for its construction. Elizabeth laid the first stone on 27 August 1840, but died 19 December 1840; she is buried within the church. Her family subsequently made further donations to pay for the communion plate, altar table and velvet covering. The church was built in the early English style: the tower has eight bells and the church boasts stained-glass windows, a carved stone altar and a font made of Caen stone. The surrounding church/chapel-yard is three-quarters of an acre, and at its northwest corner stood an oak tree descended from the Royal Oak at Boscobel House in which King Charles II hid to escape the Roundheads following the Battle of Worcester in 1651. In 1863 the church is described as a 'chapelry' annexed to the rectory at Netherseal; the curate was Rev. John Morewood Gresley, M.A. The church is Grade II listed. Gresley was the founding secretary of the Anastatic Drawing Society. founded in 1855.

The Lord of the Manor built a school adjacent to the church in 1841.

A Baptist chapel was built in the village in 1840 and a Methodist chapel in 1860.

== Annual Gala ==
Every year a gala takes place on one afternoon in July. This includes a parade of floats led by the "Gala King and Queen" and their attendants.

== Notable residents ==
- Joseph Wilkes (1733–1805), industrialist and agricultural improver
- Rosa Mackenzie Kettle (1818–1895), an English novelist and poet.

=== Sport ===
- Charlie Freeman (1887–1956), footballer who played 208 games and one first-class cricket match for Derbyshire
- Ernie Hart (1902–1954), footballer, played 447 games for Leeds United
- Jack Kirby (1909–1960), football goalkeeper who played 173 games for Derby County

== See also ==
- Listed buildings in Overseal
