= Acresford =

Village in Leicestershire, England

Coordinates: 52.715°N 1.560°W

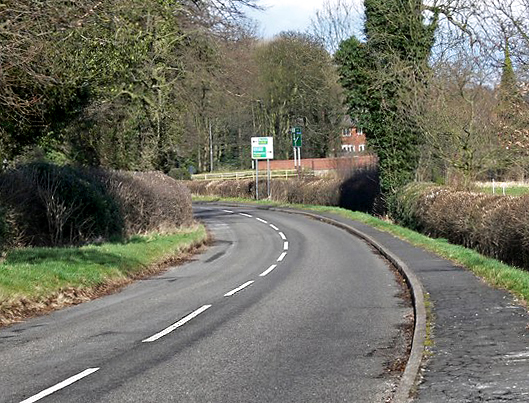
- Acresford Road near Acresford.

- Location within Leicestershire
- OS grid reference: SK298136
- Civil parish: Oakthorpe, Donisthorpe and Acresford
- District: North West Leicestershire
- Shire county: Leicestershire
- Region: East Midlands
- Country: England
- Sovereign state: United Kingdom
- Post town: SWADLINCOTE
- Postcode district: DE12
- Police: Leicestershire
- Fire: Leicestershire
- Ambulance: East Midlands
- UK Parliament: North West Leicestershire

Acresford is a village in North West Leicestershire, it shares civil parish authorities with Donisthorpe and Oakthorpe, and forms part of the border with South Derbyshire. Located in the settlement is an abandoned quarry.
