= Short Heath =

Short Heath is the name of these places in England:

- Short Heath, Derbyshire
- Short Heath, Birmingham
- Short Heath, Willenhall
