= List of United Kingdom locations: The-Thh =

The United Kingdom

This is part of the list of United Kingdom locations: a gazetteer of place names in the United Kingdom showing each place's locality and geographical coordinates.

== The ==
=== The A ===
Location	Locality	Coordinates (links to map & photo sources)	OS grid reference
The Aird	Highland	57.47°N 04.60°W	NH442455
Theakston	North Yorkshire	54.26°N 01.54°W	SE3085
Thealby	North Lincolnshire	53.64°N 00.65°W	SE8917
The Alders	Staffordshire	52.63°N 01.72°W	SK1904
Theale	Somerset	51.21°N 02.77°W	ST4646
Theale	Berkshire	51.43°N 01.08°W	SU6471
The Arms	Norfolk	52.54°N 00.75°E	TL8798
Thearne	East Riding of Yorkshire	53.80°N 00.37°W	TA0736

=== The B ===
Location	Locality	Coordinates (links to map & photo sources)	OS grid reference
The Bage	Herefordshire	52.08°N 03.03°W	SO2943
The Bank	Cheshire	53.11°N 02.24°W	SJ8457
The Banks	Stockport	53.38°N 02.04°W	SJ9787
The Banks	Wiltshire	51.51°N 01.98°W	SU0179
The Bar (Barmouth)	Gwynedd	52.70°N 04.05°W	SH610141
The Bar (Caernarfon)	Gwynedd	53.11°N 04.34°W	SH434595
The Bar	Highland	57.62°N 03.79°W	NH931610
The Barony	Cheshire	53.07°N 02.52°W	SJ6553
The Barony	Orkney Islands	59.12°N 03.31°W	HY2527
The Barton	Wiltshire	51.51°N 01.90°W	SU0779
The Batch	South Gloucestershire	51.44°N 02.49°W	ST6672
The Beeches	Gloucestershire	51.71°N 01.95°W	SP0302
The Bell	Wigan	53.54°N 02.69°W	SD5405
The Bents	Staffordshire	52.90°N 01.97°W	SK0234
Theberton	Suffolk	52.22°N 01.55°E	TM4365
The Blythe	Staffordshire	52.84°N 01.94°W	SK0428
The Bog	Shropshire	52.56°N 02.96°W	SO3597
The Borough	Southwark	51.49°N 00.09°W	TQ3279
The Bourne	Surrey	51.18°N 00.79°W	SU8444
The Bourne	Worcestershire	52.20°N 02.03°W	SO9856
The Brampton	Staffordshire	53.01°N 02.23°W	SJ8446
The Brand	Leicestershire	52.71°N 01.21°W	SK5313
The Bratch	Staffordshire	52.53°N 02.20°W	SO8693
The Brents	Kent	51.31°N 00.88°E	TR0161
The Bridge	Dorset	50.91°N 02.31°W	ST7813
The Broad	Herefordshire	52.23°N 02.74°W	SO4960
The Brook	Suffolk	52.34°N 01.05°E	TM0876
The Brushes	Derbyshire	53.27°N 01.44°W	SK3775
The Bryn	Monmouthshire	51.77°N 02.97°W	SO3309
The Burf	Worcestershire	52.30°N 02.28°W	SO8167
The Butts	Hampshire	51.13°N 00.98°W	SU7138

=== The C ===
Location	Locality	Coordinates (links to map & photo sources)	OS grid reference
The Camp	Gloucestershire	51.77°N 02.13°W	SO9109
The Camp	Hertfordshire	51.74°N 00.32°W	TL1606
The Cape	Warwickshire	52.28°N 01.60°W	SP2765
The Carracks	Cornwall	50.20°N 05.54°W	SW472401
The Chart	Kent	51.24°N 00.09°E	TQ4652
The Chequer	Wrexham	52.95°N 02.76°W	SJ4940
The Chuckery	Walsall	52.58°N 01.97°W	SP0298
The City	Buckinghamshire	51.65°N 00.87°W	SU7896
The Cleaver	Herefordshire	51.95°N 02.71°W	SO5129
The Close	West Sussex	50.82°N 00.79°W	SU8504
The Clubb	Shetland Islands	60.36°N 01.82°W	HU097646
The Colony	Oxfordshire	52.03°N 01.50°W	SP3437
The Common	Bath and North East Somerset	51.36°N 02.54°W	ST6263
The Common	Buckinghamshire	51.97°N 00.88°W	SP7731
The Common	Dorset	50.88°N 02.31°W	ST7810
The Common	Shropshire	52.83°N 02.49°W	SJ6727
The Common	Suffolk	52.09°N 01.09°E	TM1248
The Common	West Sussex	51.06°N 00.34°W	TQ1631
The Common (Brinkworth)	Wiltshire	51.55°N 01.97°W	SU0284
The Common (Broughton Gifford)	Wiltshire	51.37°N 02.18°W	ST8764
The Common (Winterslow)	Wiltshire	51.08°N 01.65°W	SU2432
The Common	Swansea	51.60°N 04.16°W	SS5092
The Corner	Kent	51.14°N 00.42°E	TQ7041
The Corner	Shropshire	52.47°N 02.84°W	SO4387
The Cot	Monmouthshire	51.68°N 02.72°W	ST5099
The Crofts	East Riding of Yorkshire	54.11°N 00.15°W	TA2170
The Cronk	Isle of Man	54.32°N 04.56°W	SC3395
The Cross Hands	Leicestershire	52.61°N 01.51°W	SK3302
The Cwm	Monmouthshire	51.62°N 02.79°W	ST4592

=== Thed ===
Location	Locality	Coordinates (links to map & photo sources)	OS grid reference
Theddingworth	Leicestershire	52.45°N 01.02°W	SP6685
Theddlethorpe All Saints	Lincolnshire	53.36°N 00.19°E	TF4688
Theddlethorpe St Helen	Lincolnshire	53.36°N 00.20°E	TF4788
The Delves	Walsall	52.56°N 01.98°W	SP0196
The Den	North Ayrshire	55.72°N 04.67°W	NS3251
The Dene	Durham	54.88°N 01.83°W	NZ1154
The Dene	Hampshire	51.27°N 01.45°W	SU3853
The Down	Kent	51.09°N 00.38°E	TQ6735
The Down	Shropshire	52.50°N 02.47°W	SO6890
The Downs	Surrey	51.10°N 00.64°W	SU9535
The Dunks	Wrexham	53.04°N 02.98°W	SJ3450

=== The E ===
Location	Locality	Coordinates (links to map & photo sources)	OS grid reference
The Eals	Northumberland	55.15°N 02.37°W	NY7685
The Eaves	Gloucestershire	51.75°N 02.56°W	SO6106

=== The F ===
Location	Locality	Coordinates (links to map & photo sources)	OS grid reference
The Faither	Shetland Islands	60.55°N 01.53°W	HU254852
The Fall	Leeds	53.72°N 01.54°W	SE3025
The Fence	Gloucestershire	51.74°N 02.66°W	SO5405
The Flat	Gloucestershire	51.83°N 02.36°W	SO7515
The Flourish	Derbyshire	52.93°N 01.37°W	SK4238
The Folly	Hertfordshire	51.81°N 00.31°W	TL1614
The Folly	South Gloucestershire	51.45°N 02.37°W	ST7473
The Fording	Herefordshire	51.92°N 02.51°W	SO6525
The Forge	Herefordshire	52.22°N 02.96°W	SO3459
The Forstal	Kent	51.11°N 00.91°E	TR0439
The Forties	Derbyshire	52.76°N 01.49°W	SK3419
The Four Alls	Shropshire	52.87°N 02.47°W	SJ6831
The Fox	Wiltshire	51.58°N 01.85°W	SU1087
The Foxholes	Shropshire	52.41°N 02.53°W	SO6480
The Frenches	Hampshire	50.99°N 01.57°W	SU3022
The Frythe	Hertfordshire	51.81°N 00.23°W	TL2214

=== The G ===
Location	Locality	Coordinates (links to map & photo sources)	OS grid reference
The Gibb	Wiltshire	51.50°N 02.24°W	ST8379
The Glack	Scottish Borders	55.62°N 03.25°W	NT2137
The Glen	Western Isles	56.95°N 07.48°W	NL6798
The Gore	Shropshire	52.43°N 02.60°W	SO5982
The Grange	Norfolk	52.75°N 01.16°E	TG1422
The Grange	North Yorkshire	54.35°N 01.12°W	SE5796
The Green	Barnsley	53.51°N 01.63°W	SE2402
The Green	Bedfordshire	51.84°N 00.54°W	TL0017
The Green	Cambridgeshire	52.27°N 00.11°W	TL2966
The Green (Millom Without)	Cumbria	54.24°N 03.27°W	SD1784
The Green (Lower Holker)	Cumbria	54.17°N 02.98°W	SD3676
The Green	Essex	51.84°N 00.56°E	TL7719
The Green	Hampshire	51.05°N 01.61°W	SU2729
The Green	Milton Keynes	52.07°N 00.73°W	SP8743
The Green (Wicklewood)	Norfolk	52.56°N 01.05°E	TG0701
The Green (Stody)	Norfolk	52.87°N 01.07°E	TG0735
The Green	Northamptonshire	52.07°N 00.84°W	SP7942
The Green	Oxfordshire	51.94°N 01.31°W	SP4728
The Green	Shropshire	52.42°N 03.03°W	SO3081
The Green	Warwickshire	52.22°N 01.69°W	SP2159
The Green	Wiltshire	51.07°N 02.20°W	ST8631
The Grove	Durham	54.84°N 01.86°W	NZ0950
The Grove	Hertfordshire	51.67°N 00.43°W	TQ0898
The Grove (Wistanstow)	Shropshire	52.45°N 02.84°W	SO4384
The Grove (Minsterley)	Shropshire	52.63°N 02.93°W	SJ3705
The Grove	Worcestershire	52.05°N 02.20°W	SO8640
The Gutter	Worcestershire	52.39°N 02.07°W	SO9577
The Gutter	Derbyshire	53.01°N 01.46°W	SK3647

=== The H ===
Location	Locality	Coordinates (links to map & photo sources)	OS grid reference
The Haa	Shetland Islands	60.32°N 01.00°W	HU550609
The Hacket	South Gloucestershire	51.59°N 02.50°W	ST6589
The Hague	Derbyshire	53.44°N 02.00°W	SK0094
The Hallands	North Lincolnshire	53.66°N 00.35°W	TA0920
The Ham	Wiltshire	51.26°N 02.20°W	ST8652
The Handfords	Staffordshire	52.79°N 02.19°W	SJ8722
The Harbour	Kent	51.20°N 00.58°E	TQ8148
The Haven	West Sussex	51.05°N 00.46°W	TQ0830
The Hawthorns	Staffordshire	53.00°N 02.29°W	SJ8045
The Headland	Hartlepool	54.69°N 01.19°W	NZ5234
The Heath (Hevingham)	Norfolk	52.74°N 01.22°E	TG1821
The Heath (North Norfolk)	Norfolk	52.82°N 00.86°E	TF9329
The Heath (Buxton with Lammas)	Norfolk	52.74°N 01.30°E	TG2321
The Heath	Staffordshire	52.90°N 01.88°W	SK0834
The Heath	Suffolk	51.98°N 01.08°E	TM1236
The Hem	Shropshire	52.64°N 02.41°W	SJ7205
The Hendre	Monmouthshire	51.82°N 02.79°W	SO4514
The Herberts	The Vale Of Glamorgan	51.43°N 03.45°W	SS9972
The Hermitage	Cambridgeshire	52.34°N 00.03°E	TL3974
The High	Essex	51.77°N 00.08°E	TL4410
The Highlands	East Sussex	50.85°N 00.45°E	TQ7309
The Hill	Cumbria	54.23°N 03.27°W	SD1783
The Hobbins	Shropshire	52.53°N 02.39°W	SO7393
The Hollands	Staffordshire	53.12°N 02.13°W	SJ9159
The Hollies	Nottinghamshire	53.05°N 00.77°W	SK8252
The Holmes	City of Derby	52.92°N 01.48°W	SK3536
The Holt	Berkshire	51.49°N 00.84°W	SU8078
The Hook	Worcestershire	52.05°N 02.26°W	SO8240
The Hope	Shropshire	52.39°N 02.72°W	SO5178
The Howe	Cumbria	54.28°N 02.84°W	SD4588
The Humbers	Shropshire	52.72°N 02.46°W	SJ6914
The Hundred	Herefordshire	52.27°N 02.70°W	SO5264
The Hyde	Brent	51.57°N 00.25°W	TQ2188
The Hythe	Essex	51.87°N 00.91°E	TM0124
The Hyde	Worcestershire	52.05°N 02.24°W	SO8340

=== The I ===
Location	Locality	Coordinates (links to map & photo sources)	OS grid reference
The Inch	City of Edinburgh	55.91°N 03.16°W	NT2770

=== The K ===
Location	Locality	Coordinates (links to map & photo sources)	OS grid reference
The Knab	Swansea	51.56°N 03.99°W	SS6287
The Knap	The Vale Of Glamorgan	51.38°N 03.30°W	ST0966
The Knapp	Herefordshire	52.18°N 02.51°W	SO6554
The Knapp	South Gloucestershire	51.61°N 02.50°W	ST6591
The Knowle	Sandwell	52.48°N 02.06°W	SO9687

=== The L ===
Location	Locality	Coordinates (links to map & photo sources)	OS grid reference
The Laches	Staffordshire	52.66°N 02.11°W	SJ9207
The Lake	Dumfries and Galloway	54.80°N 04.05°W	NX6847
The Lakes	Worcestershire	52.37°N 02.33°W	SO7775
The Lawe	South Tyneside	54.99°N 01.43°W	NZ3667
The Lawns	East Riding of Yorkshire	53.78°N 00.43°W	TA0333
The Leacon	Kent	51.06°N 00.82°E	TQ9833
The Leath	Shropshire	52.49°N 02.62°W	SO5889
The Lee	Buckinghamshire	51.72°N 00.69°W	SP9004
The Lees	Kent	51.21°N 00.86°E	TR0050
The Leigh	Gloucestershire	51.93°N 02.19°W	SO8726
The Leys	Staffordshire	52.63°N 01.70°W	SK2004
The Lhen	Isle of Man	54.37°N 04.49°W	NX3801
The Ling	Norfolk	52.53°N 01.38°E	TM3098
The Lings	Doncaster	53.56°N 01.01°W	SE6508
The Lings	Norfolk	52.61°N 00.99°E	TG0306
The Linleys	Wiltshire	51.41°N 02.18°W	ST8768
Thelnetham	Suffolk	52.36°N 00.95°E	TM0178
The Lunt	Wolverhampton	52.56°N 02.06°W	SO9696
Thelveton	Norfolk	52.38°N 01.17°E	TM1681
Thelwall	Cheshire	53.37°N 02.54°W	SJ6487

=== The M ===
Location	Locality	Coordinates (links to map & photo sources)	OS grid reference
The Manor	West Sussex	50.82°N 00.80°W	SU8404
The Marsh	Cheshire	53.15°N 02.24°W	SJ8462
The Marsh	Herefordshire	52.22°N 02.74°W	SO4959
The Marsh	Powys	52.56°N 03.01°W	SO3197
The Marsh	Shropshire	52.82°N 02.46°W	SJ6925
The Marsh	Staffordshire	52.83°N 02.23°W	SJ8426
The Marsh (Wortham)	Suffolk	52.35°N 01.05°E	TM0877
The Marsh (Thrandeston)	Suffolk	52.34°N 01.09°E	TM1176
Themelthorpe	Norfolk	52.77°N 01.03°E	TG0524
The Middles	Durham	54.85°N 01.68°W	NZ2051
The Mint	Hampshire	51.04°N 00.88°W	SU7828
The Model Village	Warwickshire	52.27°N 01.40°W	SP4164
The Moor	Kent	51.03°N 00.49°E	TQ7529
The Moor	Flintshire	53.18°N 03.01°W	SJ3266
The Mooragh	Isle of Man	54.31°N 04.38°W	SC4594
The Moors	Herefordshire	51.98°N 02.67°W	SO5432
The Mount	Dorset	50.76°N 02.73°W	SY4896
The Mount	Berkshire	51.44°N 00.96°W	SU7272
The Mount	Hampshire	51.34°N 01.38°W	SU4361
The Mumbles	Swansea	51.56°N 04.00°W	SS6187
The Murray	South Lanarkshire	55.75°N 04.18°W	NS6353
The Mythe	Gloucestershire	52.00°N 02.16°W	SO8934

=== The N ===
Location	Locality	Coordinates (links to map & photo sources)	OS grid reference
The Nant	Wrexham	53.04°N 03.07°W	SJ2850
The Naze	Essex	51.87°N 01.28°E	TM263244
The Ness	Shetland Islands	60.14°N 02.06°W	HT967405
The Neuk	Aberdeenshire	57.06°N 02.44°W	NO7397
The Nev	Shetland Islands	60.78°N 00.78°W	HP660118
Thenford	Northamptonshire	52.06°N 01.25°W	SP5141
The Node	Hertfordshire	51.86°N 00.24°W	TL2120
The Nook (Prees Green)	Shropshire	52.86°N 02.65°W	SJ5630
The Nook (Child's Ercall)	Shropshire	52.81°N 02.49°W	SJ6724
The North	Monmouthshire	51.75°N 02.69°W	SO5206
The Noup	Shetland Islands	60.83°N 00.84°W	HP631177

=== The O ===
Location	Locality	Coordinates (links to map & photo sources)	OS grid reference
Theobald's Green	Wiltshire	51.42°N 01.97°W	SU0269
The Oval	Bath and North East Somerset	51.36°N 02.38°W	ST7363

=== The P ===
Location	Locality	Coordinates (links to map & photo sources)	OS grid reference
The Park	Gloucestershire	51.88°N 02.08°W	SO9421
The Parks	Doncaster	53.57°N 01.03°W	SE6409
The Pitts	Wiltshire	51.03°N 01.90°W	SU0726
The Platt	Oxfordshire	51.70°N 01.14°W	SP5901
The Pludds	Gloucestershire	51.84°N 02.56°W	SO6116
The Point	Devon	50.61°N 03.42°W	SX9980
The Pole of Itlaw	Aberdeenshire	57.59°N 02.55°W	NJ6756
The Port of Felixstowe	Suffolk	51.94°N 01.31°E	TM2833
The Potteries	City of Stoke-on-Trent	53.01°N 02.18°W	SJ8846
The Pound	Gloucestershire	51.97°N 02.43°W	SO7031

=== The Q ===
Location	Locality	Coordinates (links to map & photo sources)	OS grid reference
The Quarry	Gloucestershire	51.68°N 02.39°W	ST7399
The Quarry	Shropshire	52.70°N 02.77°W	SJ4812
The Quarter (Smarden)	Kent	51.16°N 00.68°E	TQ8844
The Quarter (Tenterden)	Kent	51.05°N 00.68°E	TQ8832

=== The R ===
Location	Locality	Coordinates (links to map & photo sources)	OS grid reference
The Rampings	Worcestershire	52.00°N 02.21°W	SO8534
The Rectory	Lincolnshire	52.67°N 00.32°W	TF1310
The Reddings	Gloucestershire	51.88°N 02.14°W	SO9021
Therfield	Hertfordshire	52.01°N 00.06°W	TL3337
The Rhos	Pembrokeshire	51.78°N 04.90°W	SN0014
The Rhydd	Herefordshire	51.99°N 02.78°W	SO4633
The Riddle	Herefordshire	52.25°N 02.77°W	SO4762
The Ridge	Wiltshire	51.41°N 02.18°W	ST8768
The Ridges	Berkshire	51.36°N 00.85°W	SU8063
The Ridgeway	Hertfordshire	51.71°N 00.14°W	TL2803
The Riding	Northumberland	54.98°N 02.11°W	NY9366
The Riggs	Scottish Borders	55.59°N 03.06°W	NT3334
The Rink	Scottish Borders	55.57°N 02.82°W	NT4832
The Rise	Berkshire	51.39°N 00.65°W	SU9467
The Rock	Shropshire	52.67°N 02.47°W	SJ6809
The Rocks	South Gloucestershire	51.55°N 02.40°W	ST7284
The Rocks	Kent	51.27°N 00.43°E	TQ7056
The Roe	Denbighshire	53.25°N 03.45°W	SJ0374
The Rookery	Hertfordshire	51.63°N 00.41°W	TQ1094
The Rookery	Staffordshire	53.09°N 02.22°W	SJ8555
The Row	Lancashire	54.16°N 02.81°W	SD4775
The Rowe	Staffordshire	52.93°N 02.26°W	SJ8238
The Ryde	Hertfordshire	51.76°N 00.21°W	TL2309

=== The S ===
Location	Locality	Coordinates (links to map & photo sources)	OS grid reference
The Sale	Staffordshire	52.72°N 01.77°W	SK1514
The Sands	Surrey	51.20°N 00.74°W	SU8846
The Scarr	Gloucestershire	51.94°N 02.40°W	SO7227
The Shoe	Wiltshire	51.46°N 02.28°W	ST8074
The Shruggs	Staffordshire	52.86°N 02.09°W	SJ9430
The Skerries	Isle of Anglesey	53.42°N 04.60°W	SH268954
The Slack	Durham	54.62°N 01.83°W	NZ1125
The Slade	Berkshire	51.41°N 01.23°W	SU5369
The Smeeth	Norfolk	52.66°N 00.24°E	TF5210
The Smithies	Shropshire	52.57°N 02.48°W	SO6797
The Snap	Shetland Islands	60.57°N 00.79°W	HU659885
The Spa	Wiltshire	51.35°N 02.13°W	ST9162
The Spring	Warwickshire	52.35°N 01.59°W	SP2873
The Square	Torfaen	51.65°N 03.05°W	ST2796
The Stocks	Kent	51.01°N 00.72°E	TQ9127
The Stocks	Wiltshire	51.33°N 02.11°W	ST9260
The Straits	Dudley	52.52°N 02.14°W	SO9092
The Straits	Hampshire	51.13°N 00.88°W	SU7838
The Strand	Wiltshire	51.336°N 02.118°W	ST919597
The Swillett	Hertfordshire	51.64°N 00.52°W	TQ0295
The Sydnall	Shropshire	52.86°N 02.47°W	SJ6830

=== Thet ===
Location	Locality	Coordinates (links to map & photo sources)	OS grid reference
Thetford	Norfolk	52.41°N 00.74°E	TL8783
Thetford	Lincolnshire	52.71°N 00.35°W	TF1114
The Thrift	Cambridgeshire	52.03°N 00.09°W	TL3139
The Throat	Berkshire	51.38°N 00.85°W	SU8066
Thethwaite	Cumbria	54.78°N 02.98°W	NY3744
The Toft	Staffordshire	52.75°N 02.14°W	SJ9018
The Towans	Cornwall	50.19°N 05.43°W	SW5538
The Town	Isles of Scilly	49.95°N 06.36°W	SV8715
The Twittocks	Gloucestershire	52.03°N 02.17°W	SO8837
The Tynings	Gloucestershire	51.86°N 02.11°W	SO9219

=== The V ===
Location	Locality	Coordinates (links to map & photo sources)	OS grid reference
The Vale	Birmingham	52.45°N 01.92°W	SP0584
The Valley	Kent	51.24°N 00.79°E	TQ9553
The Valley	Cheshire	53.09°N 02.46°W	SJ6955
The Valley	Leicestershire	52.76°N 00.94°W	SK7119
The Valley	Pembrokeshire	51.71°N 04.72°W	SN1205
The Vauld	Herefordshire	52.13°N 02.68°W	SO5349
The Village	Berkshire	51.43°N 00.63°W	SU9572
The Village	Dudley	52.49°N 02.16°W	SO8989
The Village	City of Newport	51.60°N 02.95°W	ST3490

=== The W ===
Location	Locality	Coordinates (links to map & photo sources)	OS grid reference
The Walshes	Worcestershire	52.32°N 02.29°W	SO8070
The Warren	Kent	51.16°N 00.84°E	TQ9944
The Warren	Wiltshire	51.38°N 01.65°W	SU2465
The Waterwheel	Shropshire	52.61°N 02.94°W	SJ3602
The Weaven	Herefordshire	51.97°N 02.67°W	SO5431
The Wells	Surrey	51.32°N 00.29°W	TQ1960
The Wern	Wrexham	53.04°N 03.09°W	SJ2750
The Willows	North East Lincolnshire	53.56°N 00.12°W	TA2409
The Wood (Maesbrook)	Shropshire	52.79°N 03.03°W	SJ3022
The Wood (Loppington)	Shropshire	52.84°N 02.81°W	SJ4528
The Woodlands	Leicestershire	52.55°N 01.04°W	SP6596
The Woodlands (Holbrook)	Suffolk	51.98°N 01.14°E	TM1637
The Woodlands (Raydon)	Suffolk	52.02°N 00.98°E	TM0540
The Woods	Sandwell	52.55°N 02.00°W	SP0095
The Wrangle	Somerset	51.30°N 02.66°W	ST5456
The Wrythe	Sutton	51.37°N 00.17°W	TQ2765
The Wyke	Shropshire	52.65°N 02.40°W	SJ7306
The Wymm	Herefordshire	52.11°N 02.68°W	SO5347

=== They ===
Location	Locality	Coordinates (links to map & photo sources)	OS grid reference
Theydon Bois	Essex	51.67°N 00.09°E	TQ4599
Theydon Garnon	Essex	51.67°N 00.12°E	TQ4799
Theydon Mount	Essex	51.67°N 00.15°E	TQ4999
The Yeld	Shropshire	52.44°N 02.63°W	SO5783
