= Rosa Mackenzie Kettle =

English novelist and poet

- Born: 1818; Overseal
- Died: 14 March 1895; Callander
- Occupation: Novelist

Rosa Mackenzie Kettle (1818 – 14 March 1895) was an English novelist and poet.

She was born Mary Rosa Stuart Kettle in 1818 in Overseal, Derbyshire, the daughter of John Kettle. She adopted the name of Mackenzie from her mother's maiden name. Kettle was the granddaughter of Kenneth Mackenzie, 8th of Redcastle (1748-1789) and wrote a fictionalized account of his life.

Kettle lived in Parkstone, Poole, Dorset from about 1863 to 1884 and the region influenced her novels. She wrote poetry and often added her verse as epigraphs in her novels.

Rosa Mackenzie Kettle died on 14 March 1895 in Callander, Perthshire.

== Bibliography ==
- Max Wentworth. 3 vol. London: Saunders and Otley, 1839.
- Smugglers and Foresters: A Novel. 3 vol. London: T. C. Newby, 1851.
- Fabian's Tower: A Novel. 3 vol. London: T. C. Newby, 1852.
- Sir Frederick Derwent. 3 vol. London: T. C. Newby, 1853.
- Lewell Pastures. 2 vol. London: Routledge, 1854.
- The Wreckers: A Novel. 3 vol. London: T. C. Newby, 1857.
- The Earl's Cedars. 2 vol. London: L. Booth, 1860.
- La Belle Marie: A Romance. 2 vol. London: L. Booth, 1862.
- Memoirs and Letters of Charles Boner, 1871
- The Mistress of Langdale Hall: A Romance of the West Riding. 1 vol. London: Samuel Tinsley, 1872.
- Hillesden on the Moors. 2 vol. London: Samuel Tinsley, 1873.
- Over the Furze: A Novel. 3 vol. London: Samuel Tinsley, 1874.
- Under the Grand Old Hills: A Romance. 1 vol. London: James Weir, 1875.
- My Home in the Shires: A Romance. 1 vol. London: James Weir, 1876.
- The Sea and the Moor: or, Homeward Bound. 1 vol. London: James Weir, 1877.
- The Ranger's Lodge: A Romance. 1 vol. London: James Weir, 1878.
- Lord Maskelyne's Daughter: A Story of the Northern Border. 1 vol. London: James Weir, 1880.
- The Falls of the Loder: A Romance of Dartmoor. 1 vol. London: James Weir, 1881.
- The Carding-Mill Valley. 1 vol. London: James Weir, 1882.
- On Leithay's Banks: A Highland Story. 1 vol. London: James Weir, 1884.
- The Tenants of Beldornie. 1 vol. London: James Weir, 1885.
- The Last Mackenzie of Redcastle. 1 vol. London: James Weir, 1888.
- The Sisters of Ombersleigh: or, Under the South Downs. 1 vol. London: T. Fisher Unwin, 1889.
- The Old Hall among the Water Meadows. 1 vol. London: T. Fisher Unwin, 1890.
- The Magic of the Pine Woods: A Tale. 1 vol. London: T. Fisher Unwin, 1891.
- Furze Blossoms : stories and poems for all seasons, 1892
- Rose, Shamrock, and Thistle: A Story of Two Border Towers. 1 vol. London: T. Fisher Unwin, 1893.
- The Highland Sister's Promise: A Story of the Perthshire Moors. 1 vol. London: T. Fisher Unwin, 1895.
