= Overseal and Moira railway station =

Disused railway station in Overseal, South Derbyshire

Overseal and Moira

General information
- Location: Overseal, South Derbyshire; England
- Coordinates: 52.7421°N 1.5506°W
- Grid reference: SK304161

Other information
- Status: Disused

History
- Original company: Midland Railway
- Pre-grouping: Midland Railway

Key dates
- 1 September 1873: Opened as Overseal and Moira
- March 1883: Renamed Overseal
- 1 July 1890: Closed
Location

Overseal and Moira railway station served the village of Overseal, Derbyshire, England, from 1873 to 1890 on the Ashby and Nuneaton Joint Railway.

== History ==
The station was opened on 1 September 1873 by the Midland Railway but only served by the London and North Western Railway. The station was renamed in March 1883, when Moira was dropped from the name. As the station has been built originally as a terminus station until running powers were secured from Midland's Burton to Ashby line, it closed on 1 July 1890.

Preceding station	Disused railways	Following station
Terminus	Midland Railway; Ashby and Nuneaton Joint Railway	Moira; Line and station closed
