= Listed buildings in Overseal =

Overseal is a civil parish in the South Derbyshire district of Derbyshire, England. The parish contains eight listed buildings that are recorded in the National Heritage List for England. Of these, one is listed at Grade II*, the middle of the three grades, and the others are at Grade II, the lowest grade. The parish contains the village of Overseal and the surrounding area. All the listed buildings are in the village, and consist of houses and associated structures, farmhouses and farmbuildings, a school and a church.

== Key ==
Grade	Criteria
II*	Particularly important buildings of more than special interest
II	Buildings of national importance and special interest

== Buildings ==
Name and location	Photograph	Date	Notes	Grade
Grange Farmhouse, wall and railings 52.73183°N 1.56264°W		Early 18th century	The farmhouse, which was later extended, is in red brick, the older rear range rendered, and it has a tile roof. The earlier rear range has two storeys and three bays, and a dentilled eaves band. The later part at the front has a slate roof, three storeys and five bays. In the centre is a doorway with Tuscan columns, an entablature and a fanlight, and the windows are sashes. To the right is a later two-storey, two-bay extension, the middle bay projecting under a pediment. In front of the house is a wall with railings.	II
16 Acresford Road; 52.73129°N 1.56239°W	—	Mid 18th century	The house is in red brick, the front range is roughcast, and the roofs are tiled. The front range has a moulded cornice, and the rear range has a dentilled eaves band and a coped gable. There are two storeys and attics, a front range of three bays, a T-shaped plan, and a rear range of four bays. On the front, the ground floor projects, and contains a central doorway with pilasters and a divided fanlight, and flanking canted bay windows, and above are sash windows. The rear range contains a doorway and sash windows with segmental heads, and inside is a large inglenook fireplace.	II
45 Moira Road; 52.73354°N 1.56004°W	—	Mid 18th century	A red brick house with a dentilled eaves band, and a tile roof with coped gables. Thee are two storeys, an L-shaped plan, and a front of three bays. The central doorway has pilasters, a fanlight and a pediment. The windows on the front are cross windows, and elsewhere are casement windows with segmental heads.	II
Overseal House; 52.73143°N 1.56261°W		Mid to late 18th century	Four houses, later combined into one, it is in red brick on a stone plinth, with sill bands, moulded cornices, and a hipped slate roof. There are two storeys and seven bays, the middle five bays projecting under a pediment, and containing sash windows. The outer bays have semicircular-headed recesses containing a Venetian doorway with a reeded surround and a sash window above. At the rear is a central bow window.	II*
Church Farmhouse; 52.73508°N 1.56436°W	—	Late 18th century	The farmhouse is in red brick with a dentilled eaves band, and a tile roof with coped gables. There are three storeys, a double depth plan, and three bays. The central doorway has a fanlight, the windows are casements, and all have cambered heads.	II
Farm building north of Grange Farmhouse; 52.73200°N 1.56285°W	—	Early 19th century	A coach house and stables, later used for other purposes, in red brick with rendered dressings, an eaves band, and a hipped tile roof. There is a U-shaped plan, the west range containing a two-storey coach house containing two segmental arches and various windows. At right angles to the north is a stable range with cross windows. In the upper part of this range, and in the range facing the road, are circular openings. The windows and doors have wedge lintels and keystones.	II
Overseal Manor School and outbuildings 52.73468°N 1.56031°W	—	c. 1830	A house, later a school, in pebbledashed stone on a plinth, with stone dressings, a floor band, and a hipped slate roof with overhanging eaves. There are two storeys, an irregular plan, and a front of three bays. On the front is a two-storey bow window with a leaded domed roof, a porch with Tuscan columns and a broken pediment, and a semicircular headed doorway with a traceried fanlight. The windows are sashes.	II
St Matthew's Church; 52.73604°N 1.56477°W		1840–41	The chancel was added to the church in 1907–08. The church is built in stone with a slate roof, and is in Early English style. It consists of a nave, a lower chancel with north and south vestries, and a west tower. The tower has three stages, angle buttresses, a polygonal stair turret with a four-centred arched doorway, and a west doorway with a pointed arch, above which is a lancet window and a diamond-shaped clock face. The bell openings have pointed heads and Y-tracery, and the tower is surmounted by a pyramidal roof.	II
