= Ashby Woulds Heritage Trail =

Coordinates: 52°44′0.06″N 1°32′41.13″W

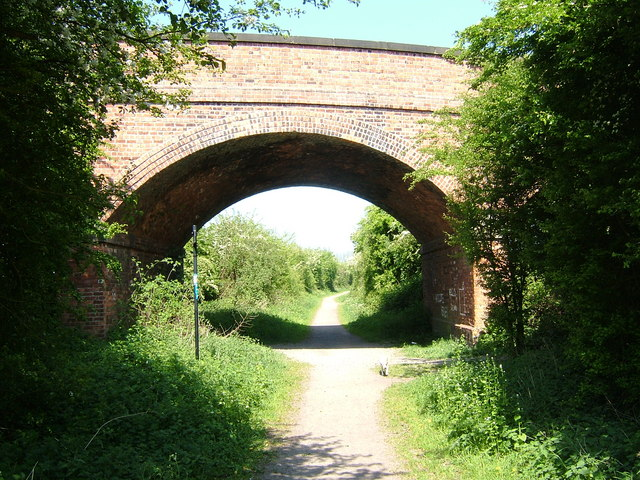
Ashby Woulds Trail

The Ashby Woulds Heritage Trail is a footpath and cycleway along what was formerly the Ashby and Nuneaton railway line between Spring Cottage and Measham, Leicestershire, England, a distance of some 6 km (3.7 mi). There are links to Donisthorpe woodland park, Moira Furnace and Conkers, the main visitor centre for The National Forest, in which the trail now lies.

== Features & Activities ==
There are stone-surfaced paths suitable for cyclists, pedestrians and horse riders.
