= Donisthorpe =

Village in Leicestershire, England

Coordinates: 52.722908°N 1.537925°W

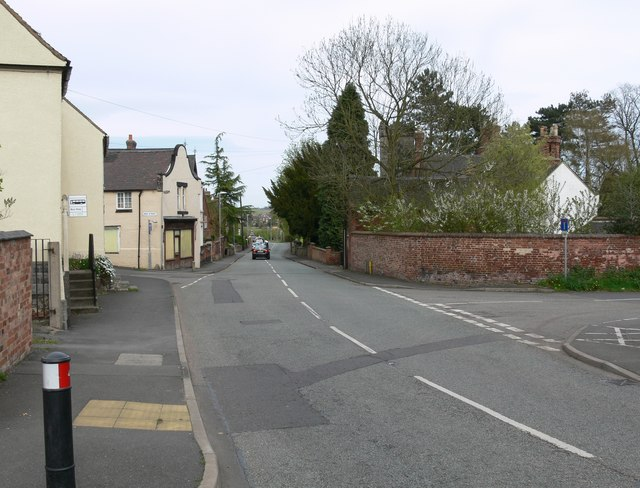
- Church Street, Donisthorpe

- Location within Leicestershire
- OS grid reference: SK313140
- Civil parish: Oakthorpe, Donisthorpe and Acresford
- District: North West Leicestershire
- Shire county: Leicestershire
- Region: East Midlands
- Country: England
- Sovereign state: United Kingdom
- Post town: SWADLINCOTE
- Postcode district: DE12
- Dialling code: 01530
- Police: Leicestershire
- Fire: Leicestershire
- Ambulance: East Midlands
- UK Parliament: Hinckley and Bosworth

Donisthorpe is a village in the civil parish of Oakthorpe, Donisthorpe and Acresford, in the North West Leicestershire district of Leicestershire, England, historically an exclave of Derbyshire.

== History ==
In 1086 Donisthorpe was part of the land given to Nigel of Stafford by William the Conqueror. It was then known as "Durandestorp" which has been interpreted as 'the outlying settlement associated with Durand'.

From: A Topographical Dictionary of England, published by S Lewis, London, 1848.

DONISTHORPE, an ecclesiastical district, in the union of Ashby-de-la-Zouch, partly in the parish of Nether Seal, W. division of the hundred of Goscote, N. division of the county of Leicester, and partly in the parishes of Church-Gresley, Measham, and Stretton-en-le-Fields, hundred of Repton and Gresley, S. division of the county of Derby, 3½ miles (S. W.) from Ashby-de-la-Zouch; containing about 1700 inhabitants, of whom 344 are in the hamlet of Donisthorpe. The district includes Oakthorpe and Moira; the Moira baths are celebrated for the cure of rheumatism, and there is a convenient hotel for the accommodation of visitors. The living is a perpetual curacy, in the patronage of the Bishop of Lichfield; net income, £150, with a parsonage-house. The impropriate tithes of Donisthorpe have been commuted for £87. The church, dedicated to St. John, was built and endowed in 1838, at an expense of £6000, chiefly by three maiden ladies of the name of Moore; it is a neat edifice, with a tower and pinnacles. A national school was built in 1840, by Sir John Cave Browne Cave, Bart., by whom, also, it is supported

From: Kelly's Directory of Leicestershire & Rutland (1899)

DONISTHORPE is a parish, formed in 1838, from the civil parishes of Church Gresley, Measham and Stretton-en-le-Field, and Ashby-de-la-Zouch and Seal, in Leicestershire, with a station on the Ashby and Nuneaton joint line of the Midland and London and North Western railways, 3 miles southwest from Ashby-de-la-Zouch, 8 southeast from Burton-upon-Trent and 114 northwest from London, in the Western division of the county, hundreds of Repton, Gresley and West Goscote, petty sessional division, union and county court district of Ashby-de-la-Zouch, rural deanery of Repton, archdeaconry of Derby and diocese of Southwell. Donisthorpe and Oakthorpe hamlets form a joint township in this ecclesiastical parish.

This parish, formerly in Derbyshire, was transferred to Leicestershire under the provisions of the Local Government (England and Wales) Act, 1888, by the counties of Derby and Leicester (Woodville &c.) Order, which came into operation Sept. 30, 1897.

The church of St John the Evangelist, erected in 1838, is a building of grey sandstone in the Perpendicular style, consisting of nave, west porch and an embattled western tower, with pinnacles, containing a clock and one bell: the nave was restored in 1889—90, and further restorations were effected in 1891, at a total cost of £700, and again in 1898: there are 500 sittings, 200 being free. The register dates from the year 1838. The living is a vicarage, net yearly value £214, including 17 acres of glebe, with residence, in the gift of the Bishop of Southwell, and held since 1885 by the Rev. Edward Bertram Lavies Theol. Assoc. K.C.L. Here are two Primitive Methodist chapels. A cemetery, containing 1 ½ acres was opened in 1875, and is under the control of the Parish Council of Oakthorpe and Donisthorpe and Urban District Council of Moira. There is a colliery, worked by Messrs. Checkland, Son and Williams, and the brewery of G. and W. F. Cooper. The principal landowners are the trustees of the late Lord Donington (d. 1895), Sir Mylles Cave-Brown-Cave bart. of Stretton-en-le-Field, the trustees of the late William Turner, Messrs. W. F. Cooper, S. Greaves, Drewry and some small freeholders. The soil is mixed; subsoil, chiefly clay. The chief crops are wheat, barley and oats. The area is 1,785 acres of land and 20 of water; rateable value, including Oakthorpe, £6,671; the population of the township in 1891 was 1,678, and of the parish 2,955.

National School (mixed), erected in 1830, for 82 children; average attendance, 82.

Wesleyan School (mixed), erected in 1875 & enlarged in 1894, for 142 children; average attendance, 130.

A Primitive Methodist Chapel was built in 1852 and the Ordnance Survey map of 1884 shows one just north of the Engine Inn, the Mount Zion Chapel that was demolished in 2003. By 1908 there were two Primitive Methodist Chapels together with a Wesleyan chapel.

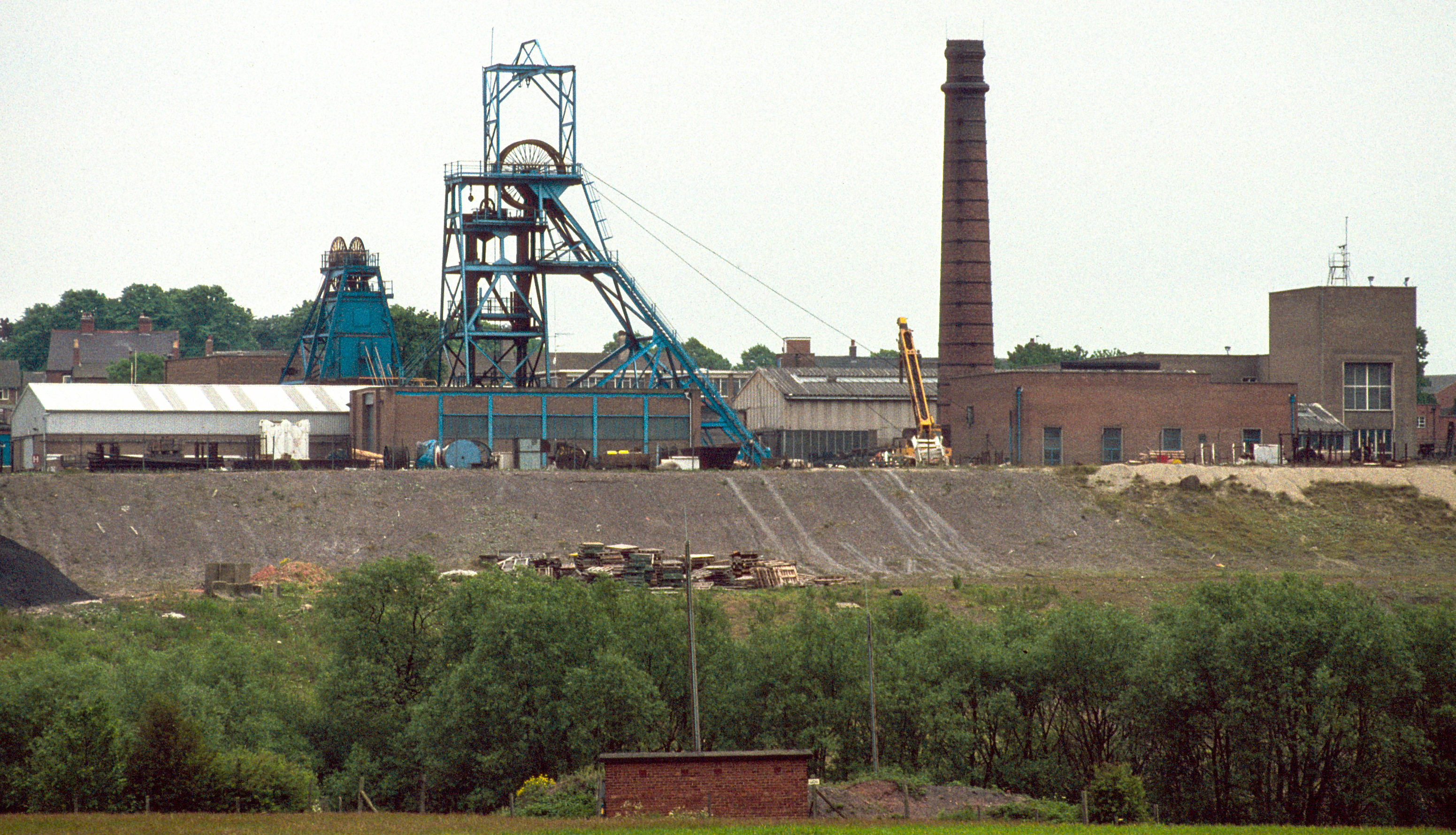
Donisthorpe Colliery, 1990

Donisthorpe Colliery was first sunk in 1871 and closed in 1991. It had the last steam winding engine still working in the Midlands which was recorded on its last working day by I.A. Recordings, listed in the External Links.

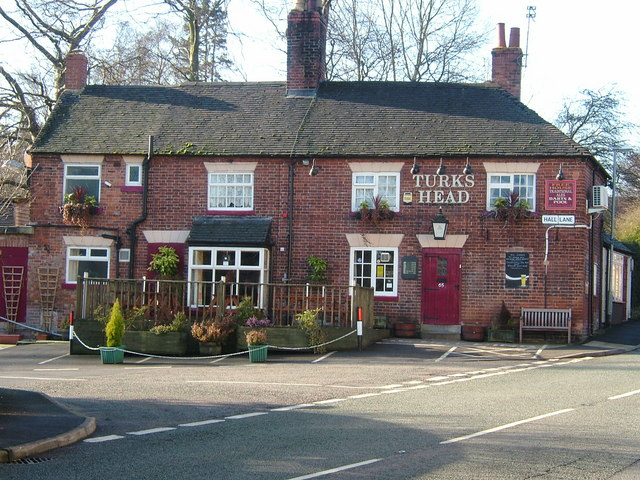
The Turks Head public house, Donisthorpe

When the pit was operating the village had two post offices, five public houses, and 14 shops including a Coop Store (now the Scout Centre), a VG store, two butchers, a baker, a general store, a betting shop and a chip shop. At the time of pit closure in 1991 Donisthorpe contained four local shops, and a post office. Today the village has one shop (opened in 2014), and two pubs. Donisthorpe Miners' Welfare Centre closed during 2005, and since became a children's fun centre. The former mine site was developed into a housing estate. The colliery site became the Donisthorpe Woodland Park. Further sites of former employment included a shoe factory and brickyard.

== Geography ==
Donisthorpe is 3 miles (5 km) south-west of Ashby-de-la-Zouch, 3.5 miles (6 km) south of Swadlincote and 1,000 yards (914 m) from the Derbyshire border, at the heart of The National Forest. A former mining village, it is just under 4 miles (6 km) due east of Church Flatts Farm (near Coton-in-the-Elms, Derbyshire), the furthest point from coastal waters on the British mainland.

The historic county boundary between Leicestershire and Derbyshire is the River Mease, which runs less than 1 mile (1.6 km) south of Donisthorpe, with the village centre previously on the southern (Derbyshire) side, which formed part of an exclave of Derbyshire. Together with Measham and Oakthorpe, the village became part of Leicestershire in 1897 when administrative counties were established and now lies within the civil parish of "Oakthorpe, Donisthorpe and Acresford".

The Derbyshire town of Swadlincote, four miles to the north, is usually given as the nearest town for the purposes of the postal service, though the village is marginally closer to Ashby, to the north-east. Surrounding villages include Moira, Oakthorpe, Overseal, Netherseal, Acresford and Albert Village.

== Transport ==
Donisthorpe was served by the Ashby and Nuneaton Joint Railway which opened a station near Church Street in a deep cutting including three arch bridges. The line also had sidings to the colliery at Donisthorpe.

The station allowed passenger travel to Ashby-de-la-Zouch, Moira, Burton-Upon-Trent, Nuneaton, Hinckley and Coalville until 13 April 1934 when the line was closed to passengers. The line remained open to goods traffic until 1971, when the section from Measham to Shackerstone was closed by British Rail. The stub as far as Measham via Donisthorpe remained open to serve the colliery until 1981 when the stub near Overseal Junction was closed and lifted. The site was still traceable after closure of the stub but has since been filled in and forms a footpath from Measham to Spring Cottage via Donisthorpe and Moira.

The village is 2.5 miles (4.0 km) north of the northernmost junction of the M42 motorway (Junction 11), where it becomes the A42 towards East Midlands Airport and Nottingham.

== Landmarks ==
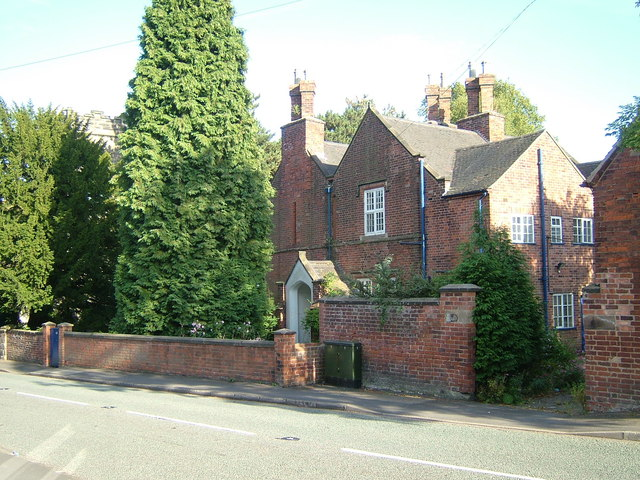
St John's Vicarage, Donisthorpe

St John the Evangelist Church was erected in 1938. It is a listed Grade II building, and within the ecclesiastical parish of Donisthorpe and Moira with Stretton-en-le-Field, Archdeaconry of Loughborough in the Diocese of Leicester. The last dedicated vicar vacated his position in 2006; the church is now part of a team ministry based in the nearby village of Measham. The vicarage house at Donisthorpe was sold but is also a Grade II building circa 1838

The church hall is opposite the church. It was originally the village school, donated by Sir John Cave, later converted to the church hall, and subsequently fell into disrepair and sold. The building has been converted to a private house.

Donisthorpe Memorial Park was opened as a War Memorial on 17 April 1920 by John Turner, High Sheriff of Leicestershire. The Grade II listed war memorial gateway was erected around 1922; subsequent names were added for the Second World War.

Donisthorpe Cemetery is registered with the Commonwealth War Graves Commission as having casualties (nine in total) from both the First and Second World Wars.

The late 17th-century timber framed thatched house, 58 New Street, was assessed in 1983 as a Grade II listed building. The house was badly damaged by fire in May 2011.

Donisthorpe Hall is early 18th Century and Grade II listed.

The Grange, 69 Church Street, a Grade II listed building, was thought to date from 1761 with early 19th-century additions. A survey in 2010 showed the building was built in the early 18th century, not 1761 as shown on the rainwater head. It has a fireplace dating from 1690 to 1730.

The Ashby Canal runs down the east side of the village.
