= Donisthorpe Woodland Park =

Coordinates: 52°43′31.03″N 1°31′47.76″W

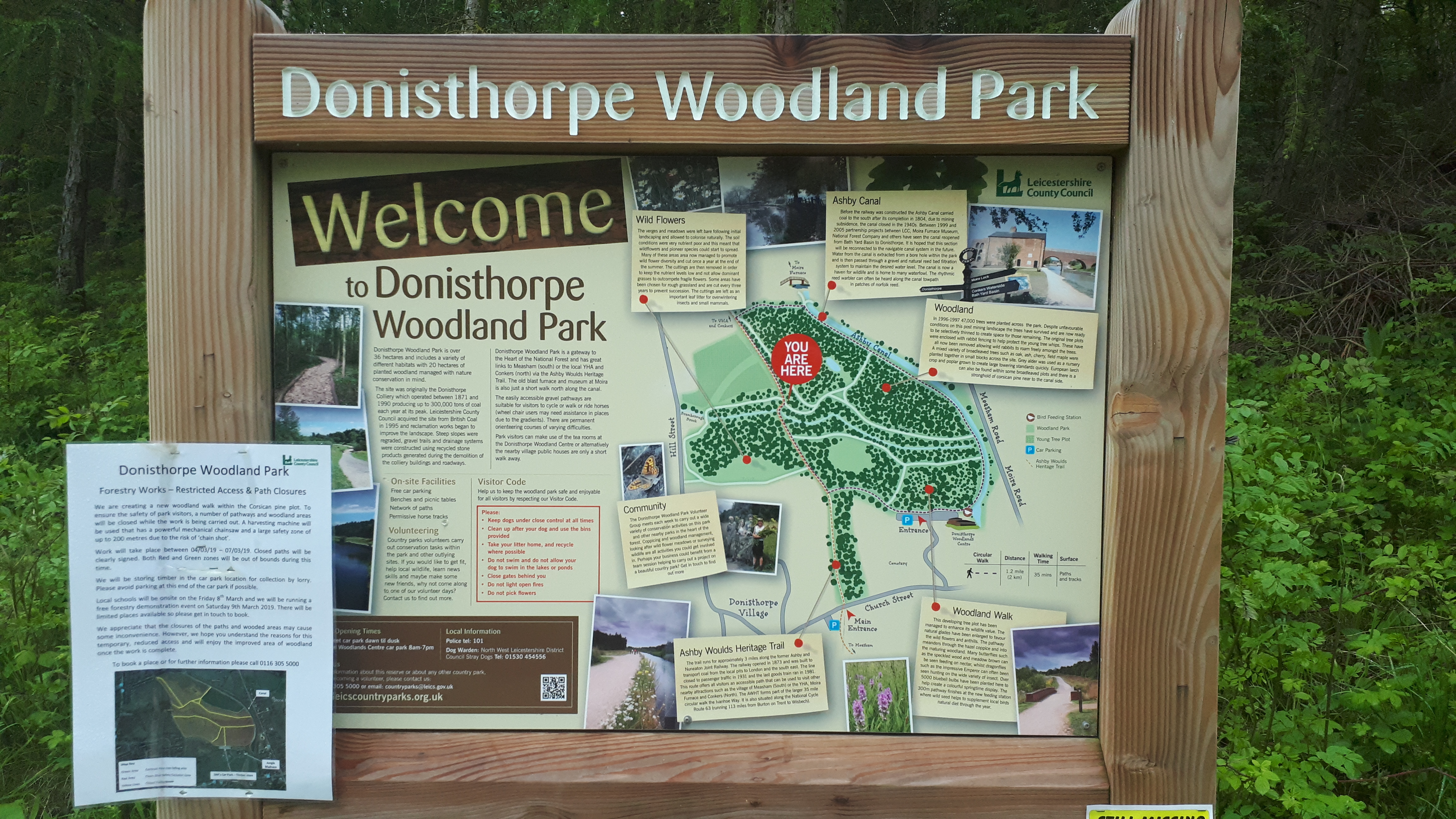

Donisthorpe Woodland Park is located on Church Street, Donisthorpe, in North West Leicestershire.

== Description ==
The park is a 36-hectare former colliery site (Donisthorpe Colliery operating between 1871 and 1990) in the National Forest. There are 20 hectares of mixed woodland and 3 km (1.9 mi) of stone-surfaced paths, which are suitable for all users. There are links to the 6 km (3.7 mi) Ashby Woulds Heritage Trail and Moira Furnace along the towpath of the restored Ashby Canal.

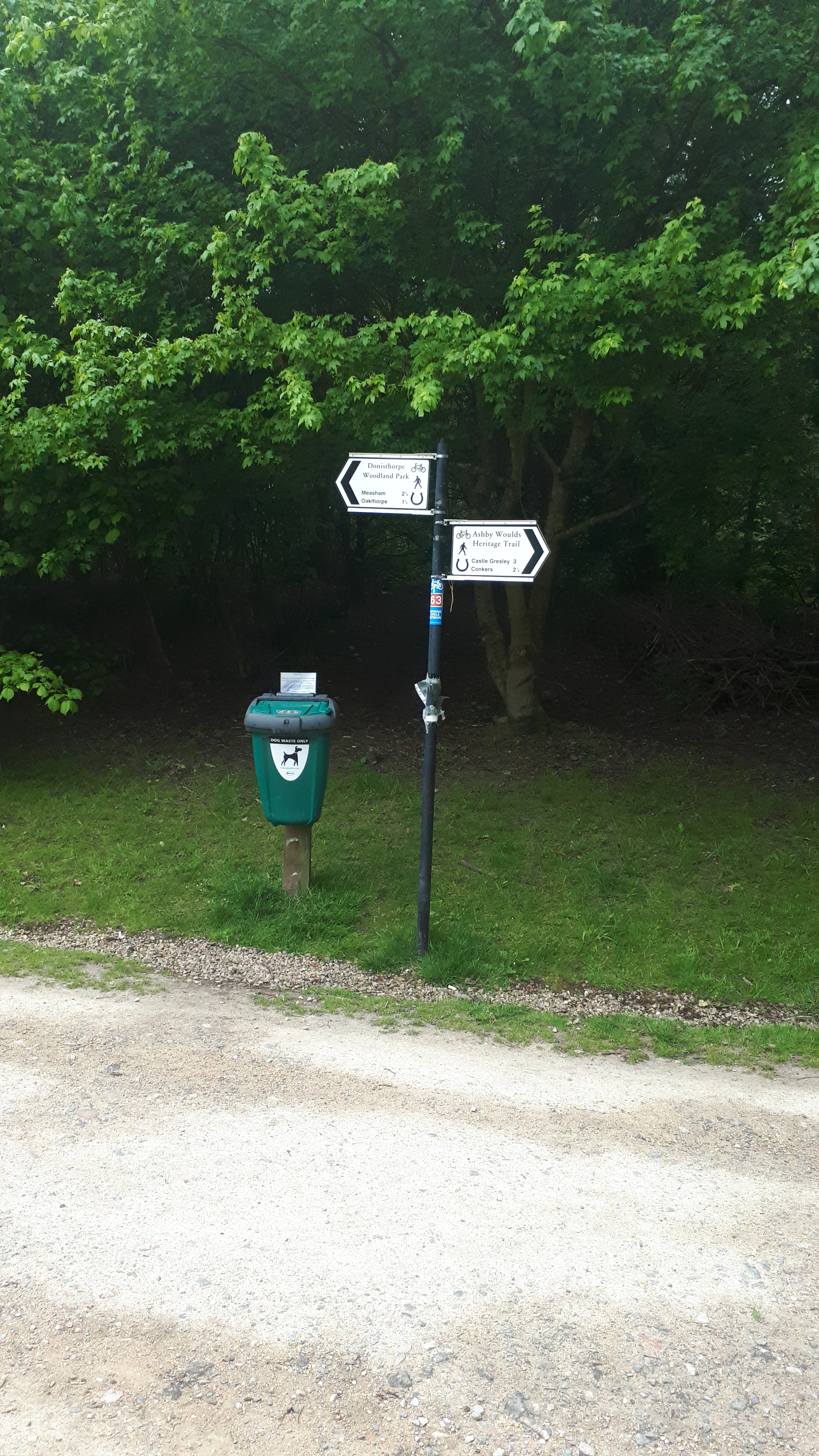
Ashby Woulds Heritage Trail

Leicestershire County Council acquired the site in 1995 and began reclamation. The easily accessible pathways are suitable for walking (they are popular with dog walkers), cycling or horse riding.

== Features & activities ==
The park has free car parking, benches and picnic tables, a network of paths and permissive horse tracks. The Conkers Park Run makes use of the park every Saturday starting at 09:00 am at Conkers using the Ashby Woulds Heritage Trail with a loop along the canal side before returning via the trail to Conkers.

== Gallery ==
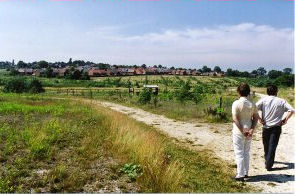
The park

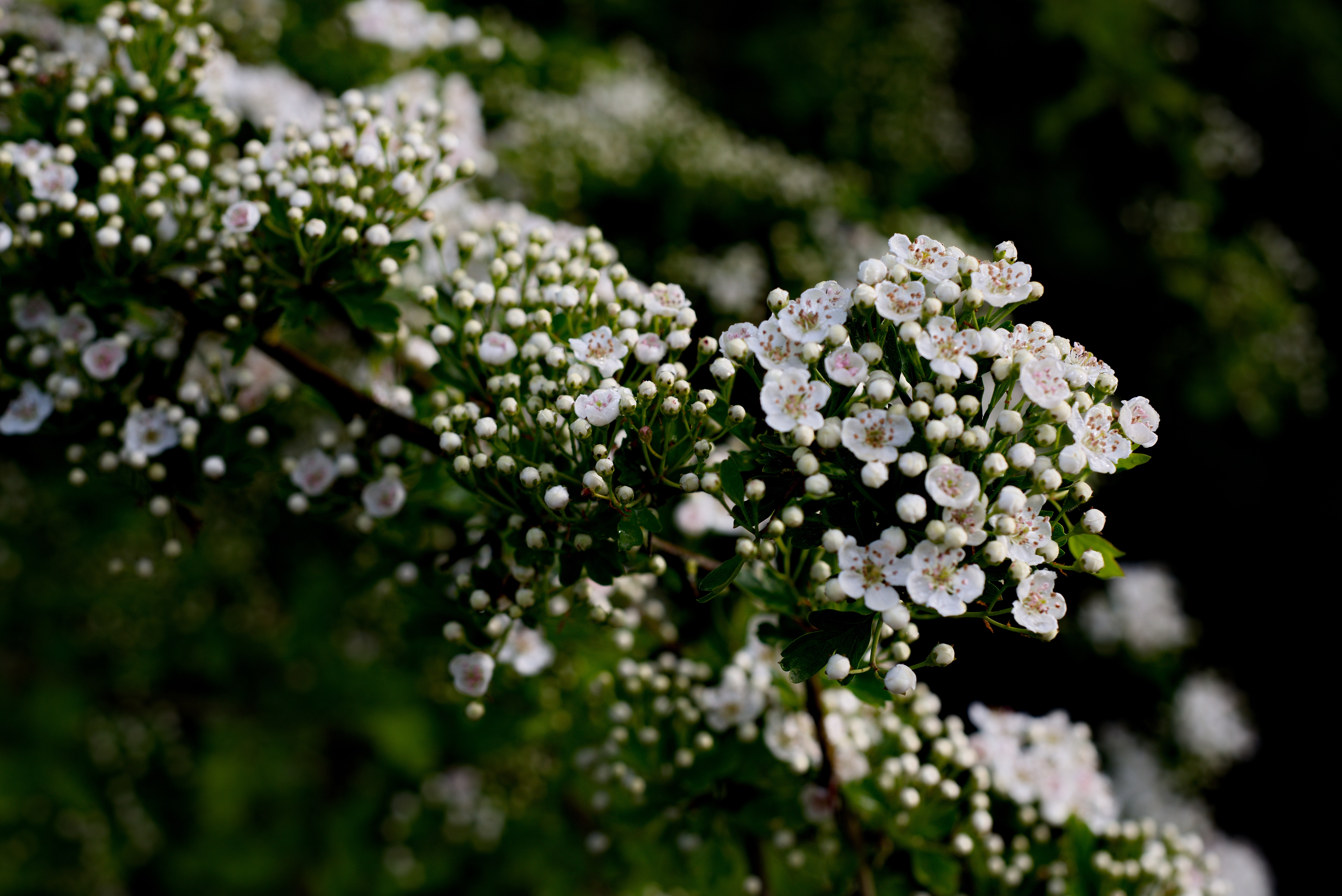
Blossom in the park

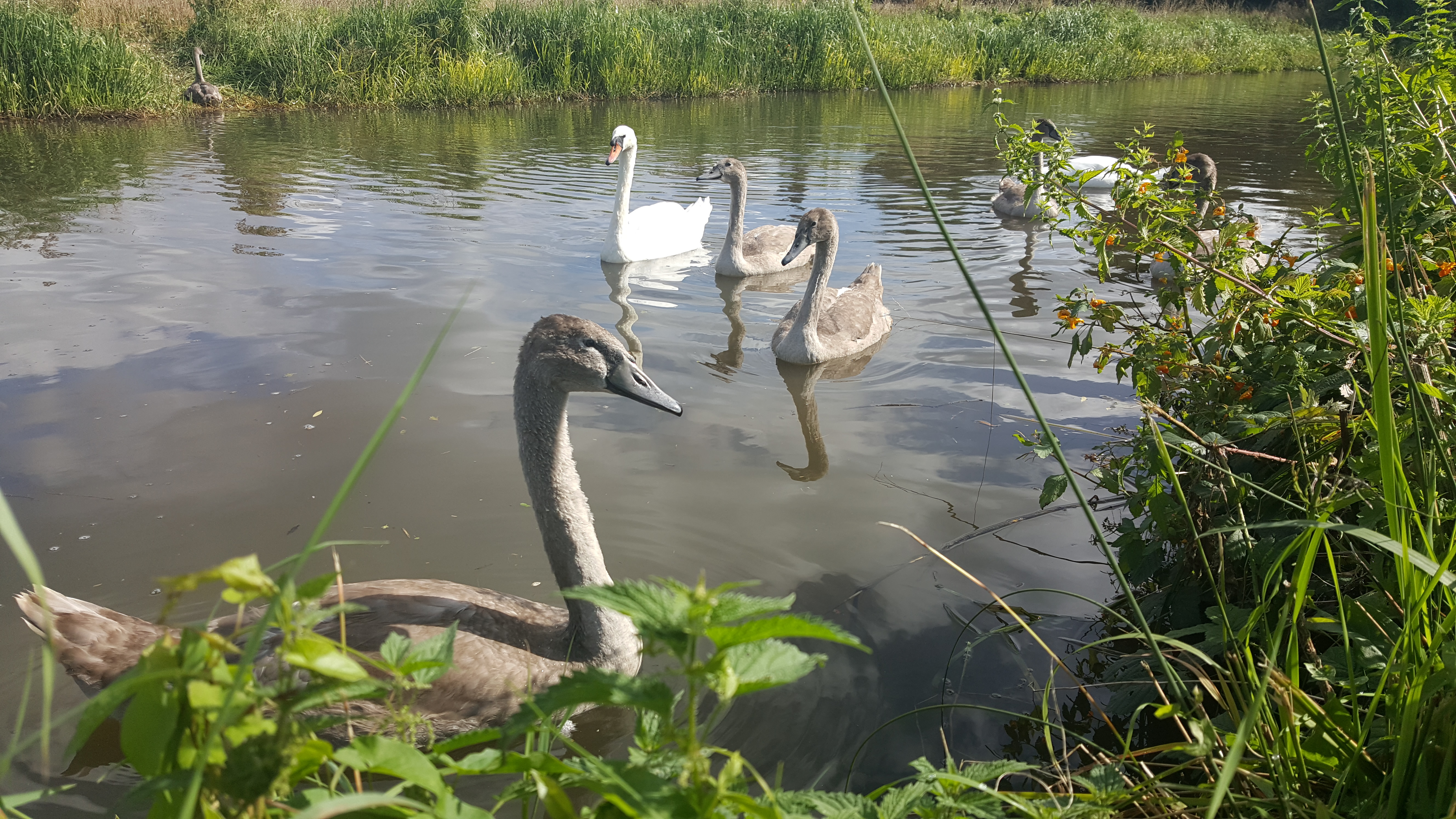
Swans on the canal

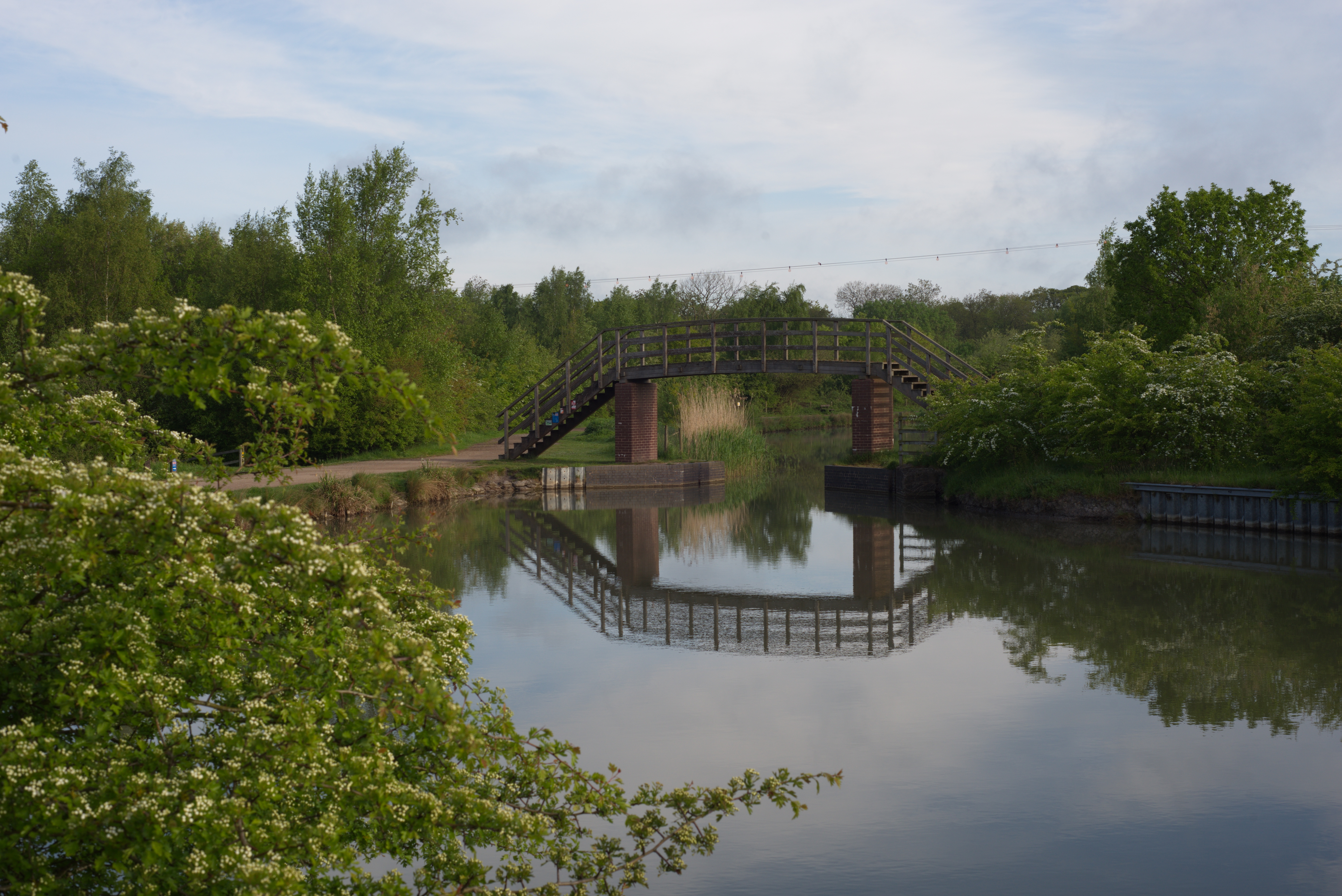
Footbridge over the canal

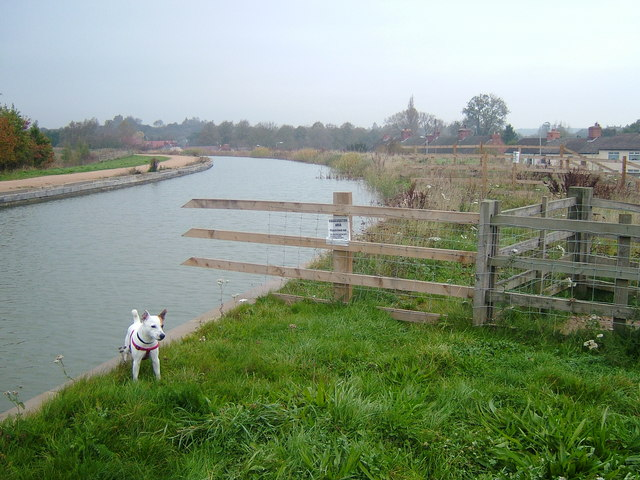
Ashby Canal

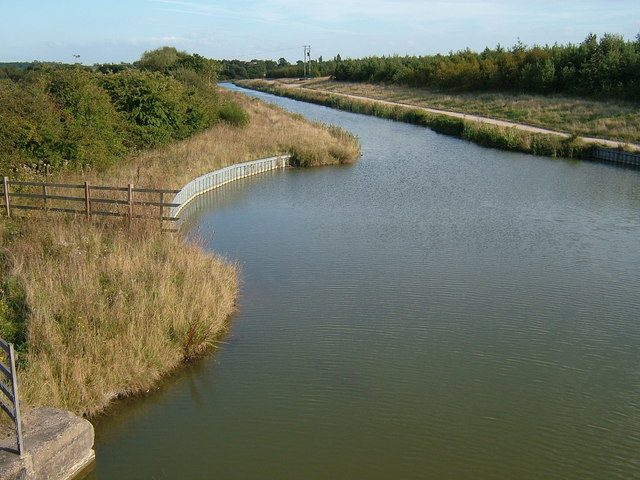
Ashby Canal

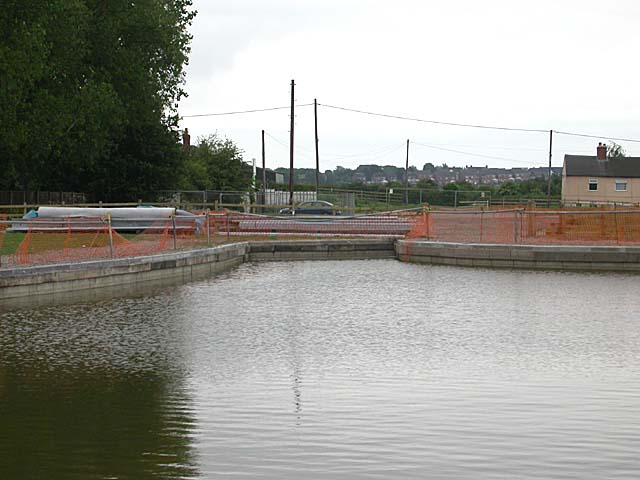
Ashby Canal

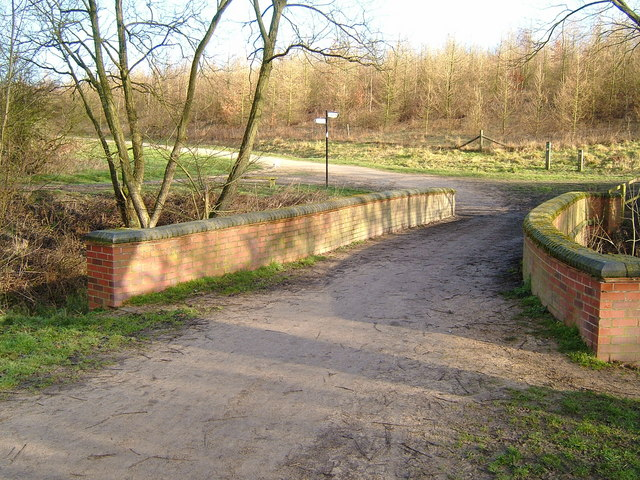
Bridge over Bramborough Brook

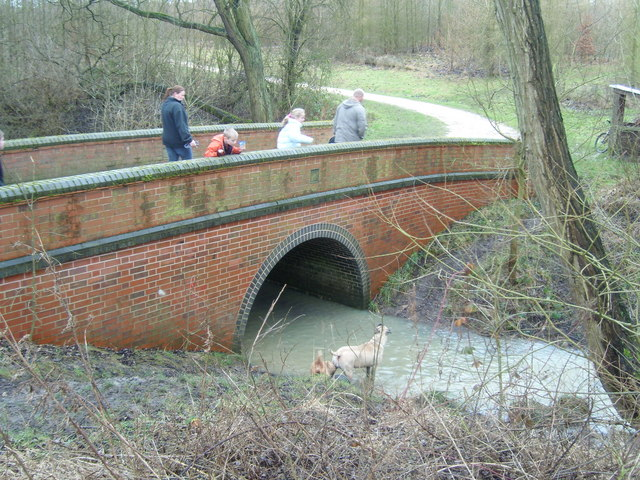
Bridge over Bramborough Brook

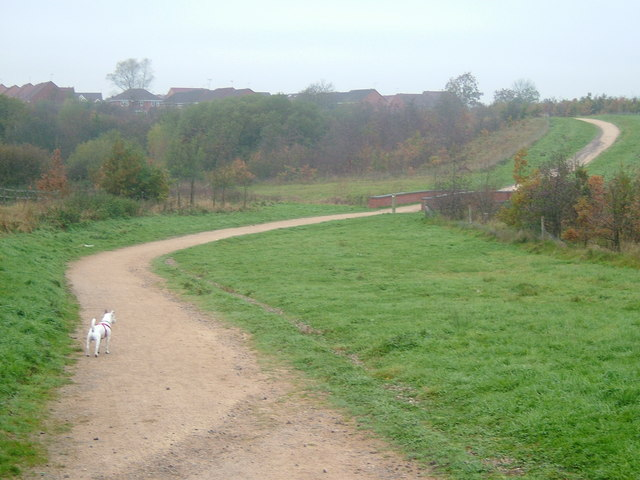
Footpath through the park
