= Ernie Hart (footballer, born 1902) =

English footballer (1902–1954)

Personal information
- Full name: Ernest Arthur Hart
- Date of birth: 3 January 1902
- Place of birth: Overseal, England
- Date of death: 21 July 1954 (aged 52)
- Height: 5 ft 11 in (1.80 m)
- Position: Defender

Senior career*
Years	Team	Apps	(Gls)
1920–1936	Leeds United	447	(14)
1936–1938	Mansfield Town		
1938–1940	Tunbridge Wells Rangers		

International career
1928–1934	England	8	(0)
- * Club domestic league appearances and goals

Ernest Arthur Hart (3 January 1902 – 21 July 1954) was an English footballer who played for Leeds United, Mansfield Town, Tunbridge Wells Rangers and the England national team in the 1930s.

== Football career ==
Hart was born in Overseal, Derbyshire, and showed great promise in Overseal schoolboy and junior football, and later with a side in Doncaster named Woodlands Wesleyans. His performances brought him to the attention of League club scouts, and in September 1920 he signed for Leeds United. Over the next sixteen seasons he was a first team regular at Elland Road, and was widely recognised as one of the best centre-halves in the game. He stood 5 ft 11 in (1.80 m) in height.

Hart earned eight England caps between 1928 and 1934, including an appearance in the England team that beat Austria 4–3 in 1932 - the Austria side of the early 1930s were regarded as Continental Europe's strongest side, and had gone 14 matches unbeaten when they met England. His international career should have been longer, but he lost his England place as a result of a ban imposed for swearing at a referee. He played for the "Professionals" in the 1929 FA Charity Shield.

In total, Hart made 472 appearances for Leeds, and scored 15 goals.

Between 1936 and 1938 he played for Mansfield Town, then became player manager at Tunbridge Wells Rangers where he stayed until the club folded early in the Second World War on 12 January 1940.

== After football ==
On retirement, he bought a bus and began a coach business based in Doncaster as E.A.Hart, which traded as the Beehive Bus Company, this prospered and later was purchased by Wilfreda Coaches soon after they moved to the new HQ at Adwick-le-Street, Doncaster. The joint company trades as Wilfreda Beehive, a luxury coach company operating from Doncaster and now nationally known.

He died on 21 July 1954, aged 52. In a poll of the 100 greatest ever Leeds United players, Hart was voted in at number 76.
