= Fat Gourg =

Fictional character

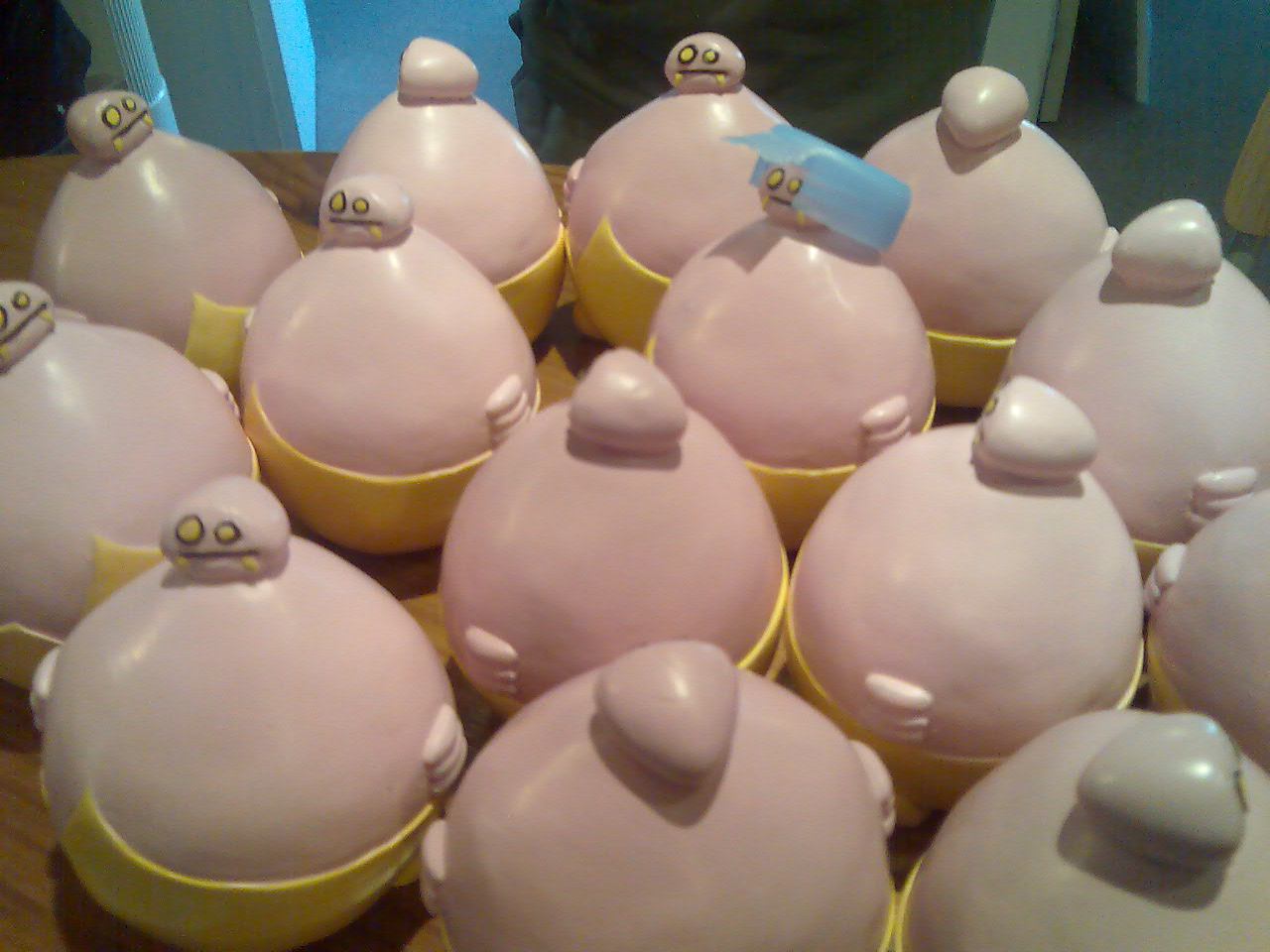
Fat Gourg figures

Fat Gourg is a fictional monster cartoon character. It was created in 1989 by Luke, a 7-year English schoolboy during an English lesson at his primary school in Oakthorpe, Leicestershire.

It has 1 arm and 15 legs.

It sometimes hides in the oven and pretends to be a shelf.

It likes to eat worms with people while it is in the oven.

— Luke

Despite the character's obscure origins, it became unexpectedly popular in France. The character has been referenced in the works of other French cartoonists, such as Pierre Primen and Boulet (fr). This led to widespread internet popularity from around 2003. Eventually, around 2008, the character's original source was discovered. The character has grown to include figurines, fan art, cosplay and the usual trappings of fandom. From 2008, 8 August (i.e. the first one on 8-8-08) has been celebrated as Fat Gourg Day, as the figure '8' was considered to resemble Fat Gourg.
