= Heath station =

Heath station may refer to:

- Heath railway station, a former station in Derbyshire, England
- Heath Low Level railway station, in Cardiff, Wales
- Heath High Level railway station, in Cardiff, Wales
- Hampstead tube station, formerly called Heath Street
- Heath Hill railway station, a former station in Victoria, Australia
- Heathmont railway station, a station in Melbourne, Victoria, Australia
- Heath Park Halt railway station, a former station in Hertfordshire, England
- Heath Street station, a light rail station in Boston, Massachusetts, US
- Heath Town railway station, a former station in Wolverhampton, England
- Short Heath railway station, a former station in the West Midlands, England

== See also ==
- Fort Heath radar station, a USAF radar site in Massachusetts
- Heathrow station (disambiguation)
