= Tan Lin =

American writer and video artist

Tan A. Lin
- Born: 1957 (age 68–69); Seattle, Washington
- Education: Carleton College; Columbia University
- Known for: Poetry, filmmaking
- Notable work: HEATH (Plagiarism/Outsource), 7 Controlled Vocabularies and Obituary 2004: The Joy of Cooking
- Style: "Ambient" literature
- Children: 1 (Ahn)

Tan Anthony Lin is an American poet, author, filmmaker, and professor. He defines his work as "ambient" literature, which draws on and samples source material from the internet and popular culture to address issues involving plagiarism, copyright, boredom, distracted modes of reading, paratext, and technology.

== Early life and education ==
Lin was born April 24, 1957, in Seattle, Washington, to Chinese-American immigrants born in Shanghai, China, and Beijing, China. His parents migrated to the United States from China, his father in 1948 and his mother in 1949. His father, Henry Huan Lin, was a ceramist and former dean of the Ohio University College of Fine Arts. His mother, Julia Chang Lin, born in Shanghai, was a poet and taught literature at Ohio University. Tan Lin is the nephew of Lin Huiyin, who is said to be the first female architect in China. Lin Juemin and Lin Yin Ming, both among the 72 martyrs of the Second Guangzhou Uprising, were cousins of his grandfather. Lin Chang-min, a Hanlin of Qing dynasty, the emperor's teacher, was the father of Lin Hui-yin and grandfather of Tan.

The Lin family moved to Athens, Ohio, where in 1959, Tan's sister, Maya Ying Lin, was born. She is an American designer and artist who designed the Vietnam Veterans Memorial in Washington, D.C.

Lin received a Bachelor of Arts in English from Carleton College in Northfield, Minnesota. He received M.A., M.Phil., and Ph.D. degrees in English Literature from Columbia University in New York City; his dissertation, completed in 1995, was titled "Garbage, Truth, and the Recycling of Modern Life." In addition to writing essays, poems, and books, Lin currently teaches creative writing at Columbia University and New Jersey City University. He has previously taught at the University of Virginia, the California Institute of the Arts, and Brooklyn College.

== Works ==
Lin's style as an artist comes from the principle of "ambient" literature. A commentary by Katherine Elaine Sanders described the style by saying, "Lin leads his audiences in exploring the temporary ephemera that fills our daily interactions: emails, Twitter feeds, Facebook messages, blogs, movies, magazines, and advertisements, indexes, photographs, and recipes."

The first published work by Lin was Lotion Bullwhip Giraffe in 1996, a "meditation backwards", where he invented new poetry structures through the manipulation of the mechanics of language. In 2003, Lin published his second work, Blipsoak01, where he again used inventive poetry structures, this time through the abstract visual placement of words.

From January 10 to October 16, 2006, Lin maintained a blog, titled AMBIENT FICTION READING SYSTEM 01, of everything he read, the time it took him to read it, and the place where he read it. In the project's preface, Lin described it as "a stopwatch of various off-hand, inefficient, and fragmentary reading practices, really the dated, after-effects of reading." A first expanded edition of the project was published online by UbuWeb as BIB. (2007), and a second edition was published in 2011 as Bib., Rev. Ed.

In ambience is a novel with a logo, Lin used a subtitle system consisting of citations in the format of Google search entries. Less than a year later, he published HEATH, which utilized the same subtitle system presented in ambience, but also focused on language and graphics from various online sources. In 2010, Lin published 7 Controlled Vocabularies and Obituary 2004: The Joy of Cooking, in which he continued his use of inventive poetry structures, this time in the style of "a field guide to the arts." In 2011, he published Insomnia and the Aunt, in which he mourned the death of his aunt, who owned a motel. Lin's most recent published work, "The Fern Rose Bibliography" (2022), is an excerpt from his forthcoming novel, Our Feelings Were Made by Hand.

=== HEATH ===
In the project HEATH (Plagiarism/Outsource), Lin presented a collection of language and graphics compiled from a variety of online sources, ranging from advertisements to Facebook to scholarly articles. For Lin, the work touched on "who is more generally responsible for certain texts", rather than "who physically authors a text". He explored the idea of an ambient novel by highlighting how a book works and how a reader reacts to a printed object when the content itself is arguably meaningless. The content skips from subject to subject in a seemingly random way through plagiarisms, outsourced material, and meta-content.

=== 7 Controlled Vocabularies and Obituary 2004: The Joy of Cooking ===
In 7 Controlled Vocabularies and Obituary 2004: The Joy of Cooking, Lin wrote prose poems that are disrupted by themselves, alluding to the idea of art being "relaxingly meaningless." He distorted the line between various aesthetic disciplines and took avant-garde notions to a new level by diffusing them into ambient formats such as yoga and meditation. The seven sections of the book each address a different art form, including photography, painting, the novel, architecture, music, theory, and film, using both text and photographs.

The critical response to 7 Controlled Vocabularies and Obituary 2004: The Joy of Cooking was generally positive. The poet Kenneth Goldsmith wrote, "Lin proposes a radical idea for reading: not reading. Words, so prevalent today, are merely elements that constitute fleeting engagements."

The work was the winner of a Book Award for poetry in 2012 from the Association for Asian American Studies.

== Bibliography ==
=== Essays and shorter works ===
- "Information Archives, the De-Materialization of Language, and Kenneth Goldsmith's Fidget and No. 111 2.7.93-10.20.96". writing.upenn.edu.
- Ambient Stylistics. Conjunctions, no. 35 (2000): 127–145.
- Anachronistic Modernism: Numbers Stations, Static, and the Cold War of Poetry. Cabinet, no. 1 (Winter 2000/2001).
- Warhol's Aura and the Language of Writing: A World of Likenesses. Cabinet, no. 4 (Fall 2001).
- Mary Mary Ellen Ellen. Conjunctions, no. 38 (2002): 99–122.
- Introduction: Boredom and Nonsense in Wonderland. In Alice's Adventures in Wonderland and Through the Looking Glass, xi–xxxiii. New York: Barnes & Noble Classics, 2004.
- My Wife Looks Like Greta Garbo. Conjunctions, no. 42 (2004): 224–241.
- Eric Baudelaire's Sugar Water, the Deleuzean Event, and the Dispersion of Spectatorial Labour. Reading Room: A Journal of Art and Culture, no. 2 (February 2008): 8–27.
- Disco as Operating System, Part One. Criticism 50, no. 1 (Winter 2008): 83–100.
- PLAGIARISM: A response to Thomas Fink. Otoliths (June 2009).
- SOFT INDEX (OF repeating PLACES, PEOPLE, AND WORKS). boundary 2 36, no. 3 (Fall 2009): 235–240.
- Architecture Is Tomorrow Morning. Harvard Design Magazine, no. 38 (Spring/Summer 2014).
- Disco, Cybernetics, and the Migration of Warhol’s Shadows into Computation. Criticism 56, no. 3 (Summer 2014): 481–524.
- A False Accounting. Brooklyn Rail (April 2016).
- The Fern Rose Bibliography. New York: The Andy Warhol Foundation Arts Writers Grant, 2022.

=== Published works ===
- Lotion Bullwhip Giraffe (Sun and Moon Press, 1996)
- BlipSoak01 (Atelos Press, 2003)
- ambience is a novel with logo, (Katalance Press, 2007)
- Kruder & Dorfmeister (with M. E. Carroll) (Centro Cultural Montehermoso, 2007)
- HEATH (Plagiarism/Outsource) (Zaesterle Press, 2007)
- BIB. (ubu editions, 2007)
- 7 Controlled Vocabularies and Obituary 2004: The Joy of Cooking (Wesleyan University Press, 2010)
- Blurb (Edit Publications, 2010)
- Purple/Pink Appendix, (Edit Publications, 2010)
- Bib., Rev. Ed. (Westphalie Verlag, 2011)
- Insomnia and the Aunt (Kenning Editions, 2011)
- the patio and the index (Triple Canopy, 2011)
- Heath Course Pak (Counterpath Press, 2012)
- An Annotated Index to the Photographic Work of Diana Kingsley with Anecdotes and Emendations by M. Moore and E. Dickinson (Convolution No. 2, 2013)

=== Art exhibitions ===
- Automasters, 1999
- Poetry Plastique, 2001
- Between Language and Form, 2002
- 27 Merging Artists, 2002
- One Place and the Other, 2002
- Code Residue, 2005
- The Baghdad Batteries, 2010
- The Evryali Score, 2010

=== Public art projects ===
- Itinerant Gastronomy, 1996
- The Echo Variations, The Edge of Summer Cleans Autumn, 1998
- Cleveland Public Library Project, 1998
- "Flatness", 2001
- Input, 2004
- Chinese Chalk in a Parking Lot, 2009
- TwitterChalk, 2009

=== Film, theatre, and video works ===
- Calendar the Siamese, 1996
- Poetry in Uniforms, 1996
- Dub Version, 2002
- Eleven Minute Painting, Reading Module v. 01, 2002
- Poni Hoax, 2005
- Disco Eats Itself, 2007

=== Awards ===
- Danforth Foundation Nominee, 1979
- Mademoiselle Poetry Prize, 1979
- Gertrude Stein Award for Innovative American Poetry, 1984 and 1986
- Bennett Cerf Award, Columbia University, 1985
- Van Rensselaer Award for Poetry, 1986
- Academy of American Poets Honorable Mention, Columbia University, 1987
- President's Fellow, Columbia University, 1990
- The Pushcart Prizes, Honorable Mention for Fiction, 2004
- J. Paul Getty Visiting Scholar Fellowship, The Getty Trust, Los Angeles, 2004
- Asian American Arts Alliance Urban Artist/Initiative/NYC Grant, 2006–2007
- Andy Warhol Foundation/Creative Capital Arts Writing Grant, 2006–2007
- Association for American Studies Award for Poetry/Literature, 2010
- Foundation for Contemporary Arts Grant for Poetry, 2012
- Creative Capital Award, 2022
