= Little Heath =

Little Heath may refer to one of several locations in the United Kingdom:

== Cheshire ==
- Little Heath, Cheshire East, in Audlem parish
- Little Heath, Cheshire West and Chester, in Christleton parish

== Hertfordshire ==
- Little Heath, near Hemel Hempstead, Hertfordshire, between Hemel Hempstead and Berkhamsted
- Little Heath, near Potters Bar, Hertfordshire, immediately to the north of Potters Bar

== Elsewhere ==
- Little Heath, Berkshire, a suburb of Reading
- Little Heath, Coventry, an area of the city
- Little Heath, London, an area of Ilford
- Little Heath, Staffordshire, a hamlet in Dunston parish
- Little Heath, Surrey, an area of Stoke D'Abernon
