= Heath Township =

Heath Township may refer to the following places in the United States:

- Heath Township, Michigan
- Heath Township, Jefferson County, Pennsylvania
