= Heathrow (disambiguation) =

Heathrow Airport is an international airport in London, England, UK.

Heathrow may also refer to:

== Places ==
=== Currently ===
- Heathrow, Florida, a suburban community in the United States
- Heathrow Villages (ward), an electoral ward in Hayes and Harlington UK Parliament constituency, and a ward in Hillingdon Borough

=== Until summer 1944 ===
- Heathrow (hamlet), a hamlet destroyed in 1944 during construction of Heathrow Airport
- Heathrow Aerodrome or Great West Aerodrome, facility that became Heathrow Airport

== Transport facilities serving Heathrow Airport ==
- Heathrow Airside Road Tunnel, a road tunnel connecting the central airport area to Terminal 5
- Heathrow Airtrack, a proposed train service
- Heathrow Cargo Tunnel, a road tunnel connecting the central airport area to the cargo terminal
- Heathrow Connect, a former train service to the airport
- Heathrow Express, a train service
- London Underground stations:
  - Heathrow Terminals 2 & 3 tube station
  - Heathrow Terminal 4 tube station
  - Heathrow Terminal 5 station
- National Rail stations:
  - Heathrow Central railway station
  - Heathrow Terminal 4 railway station
  - Heathrow Terminal 5 station
  - Heathrow Junction railway station, a former station serving the airport

== Other uses ==
- "Heathrow", a song by Level 42 on the album Level 42
- "Heathrow", a song by the Catfish and the Bottlemen on their 2016 album, The Ride
- Heathrow Airport Holdings Limited, formerly BAA, the United Kingdom-based operator of Heathrow Airport
- Heathrow: Britain's Busiest Airport, an ITV documentary series

== See also ==
- Heathored, name of some Anglo-Saxon-period English men
- Heathwick, an informal name for a proposal to create a high-speed rail link between London's Heathrow and Gatwick airports
- Row Heath, a hamlet on Rectory Road in the Tendring district, in the county of Essex, England
