= Heather (Beatles song) =

Song by The Beatles
- Recorded: 22 November 1968, EMI Studios, London
- Genre: Rock
- Length: 2:10
- Songwriter(s): McCartney-Donovan

"Heather" is a song that appears on The Beatles bootleg No. 3 Abbey Road N.W., but was actually recorded on 22 November 1968 by Paul McCartney (vocal and acoustic guitar) with Donovan (acoustic guitar and chorus) and Mary Hopkin (chorus) during the sessions for Hopkin's Postcard LP. The tune was written for Linda McCartney's daughter Heather, who was adopted by Paul. The 1968 demo has been widely associated under The Beatles name and was recorded in reasonable quality.
