= West Heath =

West Heath may refer to:

== Places ==
- West Heath, Cheshire, in Congleton, England
- West Heath, Hampshire, England
- West Heath, London, in Bexley, London
- West Heath, West Midlands, in Birmingham, England
- The West Heath, an extension of Hampstead Heath in North London

== Schools ==
- West Heath Girls' School (1865-1997), a girls' boarding school in Sevenoaks, Kent, England
- West Heath School (special school), a special school in Sevenoaks, Kent, England

== Other uses ==
- West Heath House and West Heath Yard, Channel 4 sitcoms created by Edwyn Collins
