= Heathrow station =

Heathrow station could refer to one of a number of stations serving London Heathrow Airport.

London Underground stations:

- Heathrow Terminals 2 & 3 tube station
- Heathrow Terminal 4 tube station

National Rail stations:

- Heathrow Terminals 2 & 3 railway station
- Heathrow Terminal 4 railway station
- Heathrow Hub railway station, a proposed station to serve as a transport hub for the airport
- Heathrow Junction railway station, a temporary station used during 1998

Combined London Underground/National Rail stations:

- Heathrow Terminal 5 station

Other uses

- Heathrow Central bus station, main bus station serving the airport
