= Oakthorpe, Donisthorpe and Acresford =

Civil parish in Leicestershire, England

Coordinates: 52.718°N 1.528°W

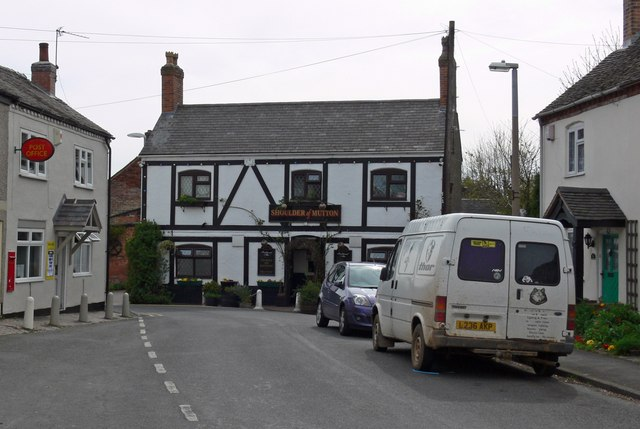
- Oakthorpe

- Location within Leicestershire
- Population: 2,637 (2011 census)
- Civil parish: Oakthorpe, Donisthorpe and Acresford
- District: North West Leicestershire
- Shire county: Leicestershire
- Region: East Midlands
- Country: England
- Sovereign state: United Kingdom
- Police: Leicestershire
- Fire: Leicestershire
- Ambulance: East Midlands

Oakthorpe, Donisthorpe and Acresford or Oakthorpe and Donisthorpe is a civil parish in the North West Leicestershire district of Leicestershire, England. According to the 2001 census it had a population of 2,336, increasing to 2,637 at the 2011 census. It includes Oakthorpe and Donisthorpe.

== Name ==
On 18 December 2001 North West Leicestershire District Council resolved to change the name of the parish from "Oakthorpe and Donisthorpe" to "Oakthorpe, Donisthorpe and Acresford" because residents of Acresford felt disassociated however the name of the parish wasn't formerly changed and on 13 May 2025 resolved to change the name again and gave notice under section 75 of the Local Government Act 1972.
