= HEATH =

Book by Tan Lin

HEATH (plagiarism/outsource) front and back cover.

HEATH (plagiarism/outsource) is a 2009 book by Tan Lin. Lin devotes part of the book to a series of web searches regarding the death of Heath Ledger in Untilted Health Ledger Project, which is assumed to be the reason for the name of the whole book.

== Tan Lin ==
Tan Lin is a poet, novelist, filmmaker, and new media artist born in Seattle to Chinese American parents from Shanghai. With a BA from Carleton College and an MA and PhD from Columbia University, his work is tied to cultural and media studies with an emphasis on issues involving copyright, plagiarism, and technology. He currently teaches creative writing at Columbia University and New Jersey City University.

His other works include the poetry collection Seven Controlled Vocabularies and Obituary 2004: The Joy of Cooking (2010) and most recently, Insomnia (2011). He has also received several awards, including an Andy Warhol Foundation/Creative Capital Arts Writing grant and an Asian American Arts Alliance’s Urban Artist grant.

== Sections of HEATH ==
HEATH is part of a series of works categorized as "uncreative writing", in which texts and pictures previously written or created by others are compiled into a different work in order to convey a different feeling or message. Other "uncreative" writers include Kenneth Goldsmith and Stephanie Barber.

=== plagiarism/outsource ===
Tan Lin incorporates several types of sources.

The text presents somewhat of a "confession" to plagiarism, as Lin quotes "numerous works were plagiarized while writing this text, in terms of ideas or turns of phrase, which the author attempted to imitate."

=== Notes towards the definition of culture ===
Notes Towards the Definition of Culture is about the subject of writing through technology. HEATH reviewer Laurie Macfee asks, "Is an RSS feed a manifestation of collective intellectual achievement, a form of art, or is it more related to the scientific notion of culture and an artificial medium that promotes or cultivates replication?"

The title of this section is "plagiarized" from author T.S. Eliot's own Notes Towards the Definition of Culture, written in 1948.

=== Untilted Heath Ledger Project ===
This section of the text involves the death of actor Heath Ledger in 2008. Lin created a compilation of web searches and interviews surrounding the event, along with its relation to the media and how celebrities are portrayed through a screen.

Readers and critics of HEATH point out the fact that upon initial reading, there are different analytical suggestions for why Lin decided to title the section as such. Some may see it as a typo and that most readers overlook the spelling of the word, while others can argue the reasoning for the typo using the opposite definition of the word "tilt". Additionally, "Untitled Heath Ledger Project" coincidentally is another newspaper story that Lin plagiarizes in HEATH.

=== a history of the search engine ===
Lin presents a short history of the search engine and modern-day web browsing. Concurrently, other web-related forms of searching and storing information have risen, such as indexes full of endless information.

Writer Danny Snelson comments on the fact that Lin uses "a history" rather than "the history", indicating that Lin's a history of the search engine is a collected singular history of the web, and that there could be many other versions or details that were left out. Going along with the repetition of plagiarizing from other works, Lin notes that "no solely paper bound or cloth bound books were used for this work ... articles, quotes, and ideas have been annotated extensively, re-written, and removed from the following online platforms." Snelson also relates HEATH to Ambience is a Novel with a Logo, written by Lin in 2007.

=== disco OS ===
Disk Operation System is the correct spelling of disco OS. Once again Lin plagiarized himself from his 2008 essay Disco as Operating System.

== Uncreative writing ==
Writers and artists take text, pictures, and other forms of media that have already been written or created and transform them into a completely different work in order to convey or display a different message or meaning. Other "uncreative" artists include Stephanie Burt, Stephanie Barber, and Kenneth Goldsmith. Much like these authors, Lin believed that "as the price of originality has gone way down ... , the price of plagiarism has sky-rocketed."
