= Heath Elementary School =

Health Elementary School is the name of multiple elementary schools in the United States of America and Canada:

- Heath Elementary School (Kentucky), an elementary school in McCracken County, Kentucky.
- Heath Elementary School (British Columbia), an elementary school in Delta, British Columbia.
