= The Slack =

Hamlet in County Durham, England

Coordinates: 54.624°N 1.827°W

- Location within County Durham
- OS grid reference: NZ112254
- Unitary authority: County Durham
- Ceremonial county: County Durham
- Region: North East
- Country: England
- Sovereign state: United Kingdom
- Post town: DARLINGTON
- Postcode district: DL13
- Police: Durham
- Fire: County Durham and Darlington
- Ambulance: North East

The Slack is a hamlet in County Durham, England. It is situated near to Butterknowle, to the west of Bishop Auckland.
