= Heather (surname) =

Heather is a surname. Notable people with the surname include:

- Adam Heather (born 1972), English cricketer
- Alison Heather, New Zealand physiology academic
- Larry R. Heather, Canadian politician
- Nick Heather (1938–2025), British clinical psychologist, alcohol researcher and academic
- Peter Heather, British historian
- Roy Heather (born 1935), English actor
- Scott Heather (born 1975), American college baseball coach
- Sean Heather (born 1982), English cricketer
- Teariki Heather (born 1959), Cook Island politician
- William (Smiley) Heather (born 1958), Cook Island politician
