= Heather Hills =

Heather Hills may refer to:

- Heather Hills, a character in Jeff Kinney's book series, Diary of a Wimpy Kid
- A subdivision in the historic Belair Development
