= HMS Heather =

Two ships of the Royal Navy have been named HMS Heather after the flower:

- HMS Heather (1916) was an Aubrietia-class sloop launched in 1916 and sold in 1932.
- HMS Heather (K69) was a Flower-class corvette commissioned in 1940 and sold in 1947.
