= Short Heath, Derbyshire =

Coordinates: 52.729°N 1.551°W

Short Heath
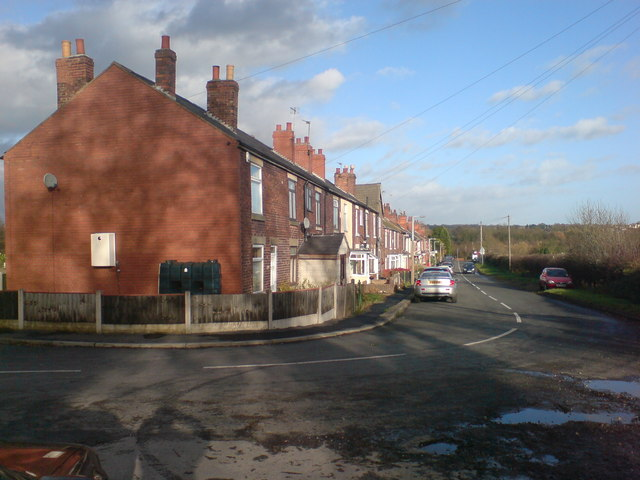
- .

- Location within Derbyshire
- Population: small
- OS grid reference: SK294153
- District: South Derbyshire
- Shire county: Derbyshire
- Region: East Midlands
- Country: England
- Sovereign state: United Kingdom
- Post town: SWADLINCOTE
- Postcode district: DE12
- Police: Derbyshire
- Fire: Derbyshire
- Ambulance: East Midlands

Short Heath is a hamlet near Overseal, in South Derbyshire. It is on the border with Leicestershire and has a sign where it claims to be the centre of England.

== History ==
It has a sign where it claims to be the centre of England, but various places make this claim. Nearby Overseal was said to be the population centre of Britain in 1971 with an equal number of people living south as north of it and similarly for east and west. However, this centre has slowly been moving southwards and is now claimed by Appleby Parva in north-west Leicestershire.
