= Ipswich Heaths =

Site of special scientific interest in Ipswich, England

Coordinates: 52.049°N 1.246°E

- Site of Special Scientific Interest
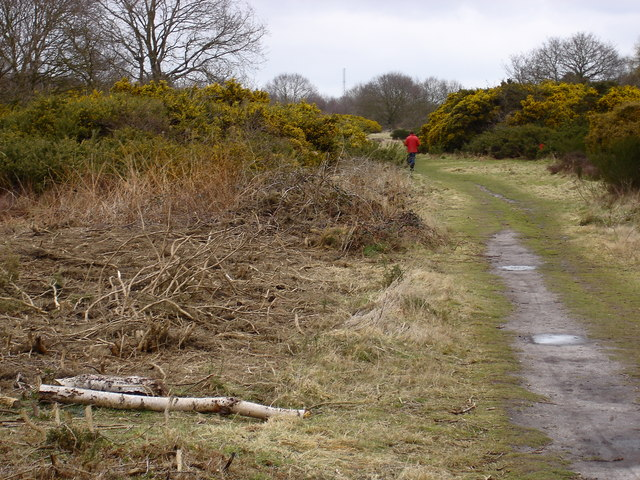
- Location of Ipswich Heaths.
- Area of search: Suffolk
- Grid reference: TM 227 439
- Interest: Biological
- Area: 39.4 hectares
- Notification date: 1988
- Location map: Magic Map

Ipswich Heaths is a 39.4-hectare (97-acre) biological Site of Special Scientific Interest in Ipswich in Suffolk.

The site consists of two separate areas in Martlesham Heath and Purdis Heath. They contain heather heath and acid grassland, with clumps of bracken and gorse. This mosaic of habitats is valuable for butterflies. such as the silver-studded blue, common blue and small heath.

Footpaths cross the heaths.
