= Oakthorpe =

Village in Leicestershire, England

Coordinates: 52.7137°N 1.52331°W

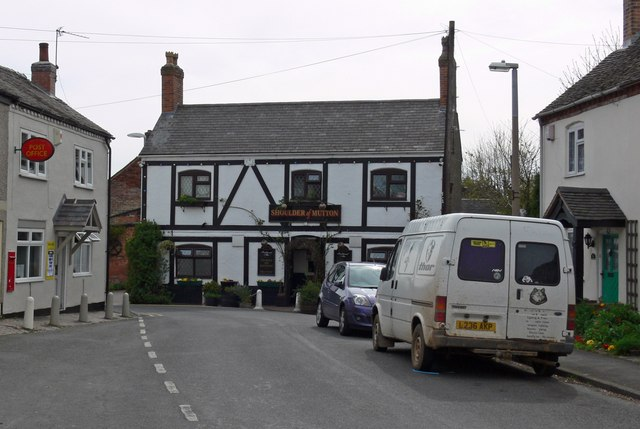
- The pub and the post office

- Location within Leicestershire
- OS grid reference: SK3219813037
- Civil parish: Oakthorpe, Donisthorpe and Acresford
- District: North West Leicestershire
- Shire county: Leicestershire
- Region: East Midlands
- Country: England
- Sovereign state: United Kingdom
- Post town: SWADLINCOTE
- Postcode district: DE12
- Dialling code: 01530
- Police: Leicestershire
- Fire: Leicestershire
- Ambulance: East Midlands
- UK Parliament: Hinckley and Bosworth

Oakthorpe is a village in the civil parish of Oakthorpe, Donisthorpe and Acresford, in the North West Leicestershire district, in the county of Leicestershire, England.

In 1086, Oakthorpe was part of Derbyshire and was amongst several manors given to Nigel of Stafford by William the Conqueror. Until 1897 Oakthorpe, and its neighbours Measham and Donisthorpe, continued to form part of an extensive exclave of Derbyshire.

In the past Oakthorpe's main use was for mining as there were numerous deep active mines in the area, however since the closing down of the mines in the 1990s Oakthorpe has simply become a residential village. Oakthorpe has a Leisure Centre, a Primary School. The Methodist church and the three public houses (The Hollybush, The Gate and The Shoulder of Mutton) have since closed down. Oakthorpe also has several local businesses such as Cosmos Biomedical Ltd, a biomedical distribution and education company, one newsagent and one takeaway.

The trunk A42 road divides Oakthorpe from Measham and Saltersford Brook divides it from Donisthorpe.

== Mining ==
The first record of Mining in Oakthorpe dates back to 1412. There are a number of active deep mines in the area, however 'Oakthorpe Mine' was closed in 1990 and was purchased by Leicestershire County Council who developed the site for ecological and recreational purposes The mines have been extremely problematic for the residents of Oakthorpe, as underground coal fires in the 1980s resulted in numerous houses/buildings being deformed and restructured, some to the point where they became so inhabitable that they had to be demolished. This problem was a result of the sulphurous coal which lay beneath the village, which is capable of spontaneous combustion when exposed to sufficient air. Although most of the coal seams in the area were at a deep level, there was a shallow seam of coal which outcropped just South of School Street, inclining away from the street at an angle of about 20 degrees in a Northerly direction.

In September 1983, a property in School Street suffered substantial damage so the National Coal Board were notified and in 1984 they sank boreholes. This showed that the ambient temperatures had substantially raised however the board denied liability and did nothing to; halt the fire, inform the county, the district or the parish councils or adjacent property owners, despite the fact that they had carried out a smoke test that showed an influx of air, the very cause of combustion. Their failure to notify anyone meant the fire continued to smoulder unchecked. On 4 April 1985 the County Council noticed a deformation of the carriageway. The NCB were contacted but once again denied liability. By the end of July smoke issued from a depression in another property in School Street so Leicestershire County Council decided to take action and engaged consultants who commenced monitoring procedures for subsidence temperatures and gaseous emissions, as well as borehole investigations to find out the extent of the fire. There was a great panic over the potential dangers and spread of fire and the media were soon involved, broadcasting the dangers in national newspapers, chat shows and the BBC news. Several more houses became unfit for habitation due to the subsidence caused by the fire, therefore had to be demolished and the residents re-housed. Despite the NCB's reluctance to admit responsibility, at this point they did get involved and agreed to pay for the re-housing of residents, refurbishment of houses and the prevention of the fire. They introduced 4 rigs into the area and drilled/injected grout and cement into the mines in order to stop the fire. They also put 4 extra rigs around the school in order to protect it. Since the 1980s, the Coal Authority have paid £95,000 towards general repairs in the village, but have not accepted responsibility for the subsidence.

Although the fires are no longer burning the effects damaged the prosperity of the village for some time, with a knock - on effect against house prices leading some to describe the village as ‘run down’. Oakthorpe is currently experiencing a period of gentrification and perhaps a change in fortune with several new housing developments completed or in progress, and in part due to the recent COVID-19 epidemic leading to the area becoming a sought after residential location as city dwellers seek more rural locations.

== The parish ==
Both Oakthorpe and Donisthorpe were part of the parish of Church Gresley. However, Donisthorpe also extended into the parish of Netherseal, and Oakthorpe also extended into the Parish of Measham, as well as the Stretton-en-le-Fields parish. Nowadays three villages; Oakthorpe, Donisthorpe and Acresford all fall into the same parish. The Parish is run by both the Parish council and the local community. The council consists of eight councillors, including Kelly Grove (the parish clerk) and Sue McKendrick (chairman).

In 2008 the council introduced a 'Parish Plan' in order to improve the wellbeing, safety and livelihood of the local community. Each village held a meeting and selected a group of representatives composed exclusively of village residents, all of which designed a questionnaire to be issued to every household in the Parish boundaries. The questionnaires received a response rate of 56% and the data was analysed and combined into a single parish plan. The process started with numerous volunteers, but only a few followed through. This entire exercise was completed for around £1500, all of which was raised via donations from the parish council, the rural community council and various other fundraising activities within the parish. The results summarised the 6 main points that needed to be focused on to improve the livelihood of the community, these were: Transport, Healthcare, the Environment, Local Amenities, Youth and Crime/Safety. In order to improve transport it was decided a bus service was needed for evenings, weekends and bank holidays and bus stops were needed to be marked more clearly. In order to improve healthcare it was decided that drop in surgeries needed to be open in evenings and weekends. Similarly, although 91% of the respondents are registered with a dentist, the average travel distance is ten miles therefore it was agreed a NHS service in the Parish was vital. Environmentally it was decided that more kerbside recycling for glass, cardboard and plastic were needed as well as a parish street cleaner. 65% of the respondents wanted to see a parish newsletter created that could be used for advertising local events and services and the 13- to 18-year-old age group wanted a youth club/drop in centre. Crime and Safety is not currently a worrying issue for the villages in the parish as 92% of people generally feel safe at daytime and 84% at night, however residents would like to see the police patrol the area more frequently. Since 2008 most of these issues have been improved, however the process is continuously on-going.

== Local amenities ==
The Hollybush, Main Street Oakthorpe, DE12 7RB (Now permanently closed)
The Hollybush is a traditional pub and restaurant with open fires, large games room with darts and pool facilities and a large beer garden with play area, The building was originally used as a hospital during the Napoleonic war.

The Shoulder of Mutton, 6 Chapel Street, Oakthorpe, DE12 7QT (Now permanently closed)
The Shoulder of Mutton is a traditional ale house that provides locals with both food and weekly guest ales. The ale house offers a pool table, a TV showcasing Sky Sports, a lounge and a bar and dining room. Julie Mole has run the shoulder of Mutton since the early 1990s.

Oakthorpe Community Leisure Centre, Measham Road, Oakthorpe, DE12 7RG
The Leisure centre offers a wide range of sports activities, encompassing a MUGA, a sports field, 2 meeting rooms & fully fitted kitchen. The centre runs a popular Art class, yoga group, photography club, youth club and a fantastic luncheon club for over 50s. It can also be hired out for private use and has recently begun the process to become fully licensed.

Oakthorpe Primary School, School Street, Oakthorpe, DE12 7RE
The primary school is a community school that teaches around 90 children between the ages of 4 and 11. The school has a pond wildlife area, a woodland wildlife area and a large playing field, as well as a new extended ICT suite, interactive whiteboards in every classroom and a large hall. The primary school offers a wide range of clubs for children, including; cross country, football, dance, and art and wildlife clubs.

Fat Gourg, a cartoon character that became unexpectedly popular in France, was first drawn by a 7 year old pupil.

== The Methodist Church ==
The present building (the chapel and large school room) dates back to 1869, when the site was used as the village school. The Methodists used the building for education and catered for around 140 children until 1907 when Leicestershire County Council leased the school rooms as a 'public elementary school' instead. Nowadays, the present day primary school still use the building for whole school assemblies. The Church is now regularly used for Sunday worships, baptisms, weddings, funerals and carol services. The chapel is now closed for worship.
