= Pursglove =

Pursglove may refer to:

- Pursglove, West Virginia, an unincorporated community in Monongalia County, West Virginia, United States
- Prior Pursglove College, a sixth form college in Guisborough, North Yorkshire, England
- Robert Pursglove (1504–1579), English sixteenth-century bishop
- Tom Pursglove, British Conservative Party politician, Member of Parliament (MP) for Corby since May 2015
