= Tim Matthews =

Tim or Timothy Matthews may refer to:

- Tim Matthews (actor) (born 1976), English actor
- Tim Matthews (racing driver) (born 1953), British racing driver
- Tim Matthews (athlete) (born 1974), Australian Paralympic athlete
- Tim Matthews (bishop) (1907–1991), Bishop of Quebec
- Timothy S. Matthews, United States Navy admiral
