= Cole Robinson =

British documentary filmmaker

- Robinson in 2023
- Born: Middlesbrough, North Yorkshire, England
- Education: Northumbria University
- Occupation: Documentary filmmaker
- Website: www.colerobinson.co.uk

Cole Robinson is a British documentary filmmaker from Teesside, England. His work explores themes of geopolitics, working-class communities, and global social issues, and has been featured in museum exhibitions across the United Kingdom.

== Early life and education ==
Robinson was born in Middlesbrough and grew up in Redcar, Teesside, in North East England. He received his early education from Rye Hills Academy in Redcar.

Robinson went on to study economics, media studies, and business at Prior Pursglove College in Guisborough.

He later attended Northumbria University in Newcastle, where he graduated with a first class honours degree in entrepreneurial business management. During his time at university, Robinson established Filmit UK, a video production enterprise.

== Career ==
His early career included travel and commercial film projects. In 2018, while studying at Northumbria University, Robinson was commissioned to create video content for the Moroccan National Tourism Board's “Visit Morocco” campaign, following the success of an independent travel film he produced in the country.

In 2022, Robinson released Exploring Croatia in 97 Seconds, produced during a five-week backpacking trip.

In 2023, his documentary How One City Is Quietly Dominating World Football explored football culture in Rosario, Argentina, hometown of footballer Lionel Messi. Filmed shortly after the 2022 World Cup final, the documentary considered how Rosario, despite socio-economic difficulties, consistently produces professional football players.

In 2024, Robinson produced The Dark Reality of Life on Easter Island, a documentary which examined contemporary issues faced by the indigenous Rapa Nui community, including cultural preservation, economic exploitation, and environmental pressures resulting from tourism.

In 2025, Robinson was commissioned to create films for Voice of the Fans, an exhibition co-produced by the British Library and Leeds Library examining the history and cultural role of football fanzines.

In the same year, Robinson worked on Europe's Border Crisis Hidden in Africa, which featured commentary from David Stenner, filming at the fence, and archival documentation of violence at the border. Robinson also produced a documentary examining Gibraltar’s underground tunnel network and its military history, featuring historian Geraldine Finlayson.
