= Rye Hills Academy =

Location
- Redcar Lane; Redcar, North Yorkshire, TS10 2HN; England; 54.605820°N 1.059450°W

Information
- Type: Academy
- Established: 1975
- Local authority: Redcar & Cleveland
- Trust: North East Learning Trust
- Department for Education URN: 144027 Tables
- Ofsted: Reports
- Head teacher: Hijab Zaheer
- Gender: Coeducational
- Age: 11 to 16
- Enrolment: 1,101 pupils
- Houses: 4
- Website: http://www.ryehills.co.uk/

Rye Hills Academy (formerly Rye Hills School) is a coeducational secondary school located in Redcar in North Yorkshire, England.

The school is on Redcar Lane (B1269) just east of Redcar Racecourse at the junction with Warwick Road. Redcar East railway station is nearby to the north-east. Redcar & Cleveland College had their Connections Campus a little further south along Redcar Lane.

== History ==
=== Grammar school ===
Saltburn High School for Girls opened on Marske Road in Saltburn-by-the-Sea. Cleveland Grammar School, its successor, was on Warwick Road, which opened in September 1953 for 500 girls, run by the Teesside Education Committee, based in Middlesbrough. By the early 1960s there were 600 girls, and 900 by 1969. It was sometimes known as Cleveland Grammar School for Girls. The male equivalent was Sir William Turner's Grammar School.

=== Comprehensive ===
Cleveland Grammar School, a girls' school, and Redcar Lane Secondary Modern (always referred to as "Warwick Road"), two nearby schools, merged to form the institution when it first opened in 1975. The new first year pupils of 1975/6 were the first intake under the comprehensive system. The school lost its sixth form.

The first headmistress was Patricia Rutherford, the first deputy head was Geoff Curtis. The current headmistress is Caroline Waugh.

In March 1995, a 14-year-old boy died after having a heart defect and collapsing during a PE session.

The school was demolished and rebuilt on the same site in 2001. The £7.7 million new building was opened by Tony Blair in November 2001.

In April 2001, it was announced that along with 114 other schools, Rye Hills was accepted onto the government's trust school programme and they will work towards that status.

=== Academy ===
Previously a foundation school administered by Redcar and Cleveland Borough Council, in March 2017 Rye Hills School converted to academy status and was renamed Rye Hills Academy. The school being sponsored by the Nunthorpe Multi Academy Trust.

In June 2021, Rye Hills Academy moved from Nunthorpe Multi Academy Trust to North East Learning Trust.

== Notable former staff and pupils ==
- Danny Nightingale, an Olympic gold medal winner, was a PE teacher
- Danny Hart, a UCI DH MTB world cup winner and world champion attended the school
- Singer-songwriter James Arthur attended the school
- Cole Robinson, British documentary filmmaker
