= Redcar & Cleveland College =

College in North Yorkshire, England

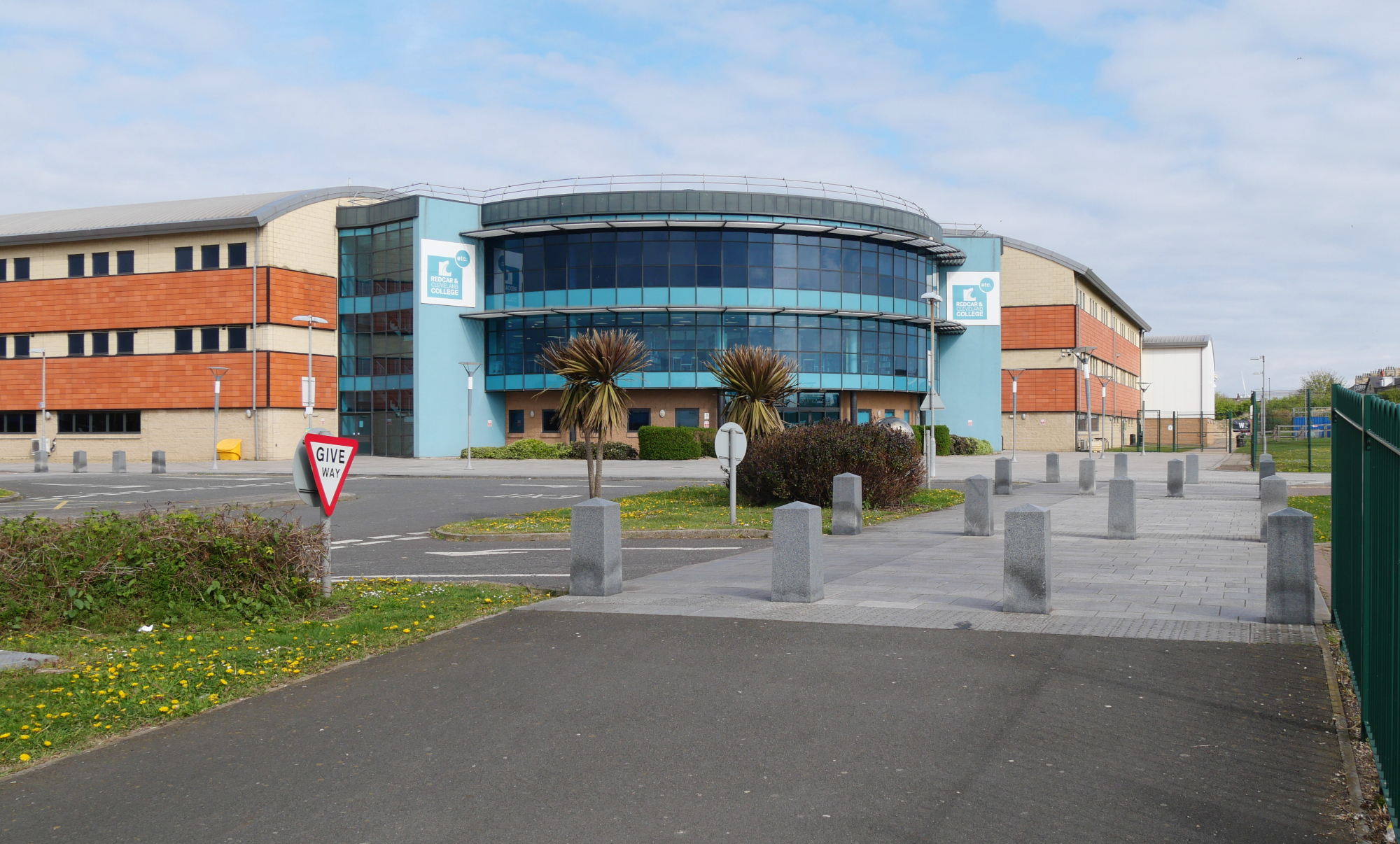

Location
- Corporation Road; Redcar, North Yorkshire, TS10 1EZ; England; 54.61453°N 1.07411°W

Information
- Type: FE College
- Founded: 1709; 317 years ago 1994 (modern)
- Local authority: Redcar and Cleveland
- Department for Education URN: 130573 Tables
- Ofsted: Reports
- Principal: Sarah Johnson
- Age: 16+
- Website: www.cleveland.ac.uk

Redcar and Cleveland College is a further education college, based in Redcar, North Yorkshire, England. The college offers apprenticeship training as well as A-level, vocational and higher education courses.

It is part of the Education Training Collective (Etc.), including Stockton Riverside College, Bede Sixth Form College and NETA Training.

The college is situated on the A1085 between Westfield and West Dyke, and very near Redcar Central railway station. It is in the Coatham part of Redcar.

== History ==
=== Grammar schools ===
Historically, the campus began as the Sir William Turner's Grammar School in Coatham. Sir William Turner left money to form a school in Kirkleatham in 1709, which was rebuilt on Coatham Road in 1868. In 1963 it moved to buildings on Corporation Road, opposite the current college. The boys' grammar school and the Cleveland Grammar School for Girls, on Redcar Lane, went comprehensive in 1975, with both sixth forms merging to form the Sir William Turner's Sixth-Form College located on Redcar Lane. The girls' grammar school became Rye Hills School. The original school charity still exists as the Sir William Turner Foundation.

=== College merger ===
In 1994, the sixth form college moved back to Corporation Road and merged with Cleveland Technical College to form the current college.

In 2018, the college merged with Stockton Riverside College. As part of the merger both colleges maintained their name and identities in their respective local communities.

In 2019 the Group changed its name to the Education Training Collective to more accurately reflect the diversity of all of its campuses while still maintaining all of the individual college names.

=== Former campuses ===
The main college was the Corporation Road Campus of the college. The Connections Campus was on Redcar Lane (B1269), at the southern end of Redcar Racecourse. This site was planned to become 187 new houses. The Loftus Campus was in the Centre of Opportunity & Partnership on High Street in Loftus, North Yorkshire.

== Notable former pupils ==
=== Sir William Turner's Grammar School ===
- Ian Bancroft, Baron Bancroft (of Coatham in the county of Cleveland), President from 1987 to 1993 of the Building Centre Trust
- John Baycroft, bishop
- Frank Brenchley, Ambassador from 1972–74 to Poland, and from 1968–72 to Norway
- Sir George Malcolm Brown, geologist, Director from 1979 to 1985 of the British Geological Survey
- Sir Steve Bullock
- Paul Daniels, magician
- Prof Harry Elderfield, Professor of Ocean Geochemistry and Palaeochemistry from 1999 to 2010 at the University of Cambridge, and 2003 winner of the Geological Society of London's Lyell Medal
- Sir Rex Hunt, Commander-in-Chief from 1980 to 1985 of the Falkland Islands
- Alan Keen, Labour MP from 1992 to 2011 for Feltham and Heston
- Raymond Pennock, Baron Pennock (of Norton in the county of Cleveland), President from 1978 to 1979 of the Chemical Industries Association (CIA), and from 1980 to 1982 of the Confederation of British Industry (CBI), and chairman from 1980 to 1984 of BICC plc
- Sir Robert Stopford, Bishop of London from 1961 to 1973
- Donald Tyerman, Editor from 1956 to 1965 of The Economist
- Tim Williamson, footballer
- Roger Woolhouse, philosopher
