= Pursglove, West Virginia =

- Unincorporated community
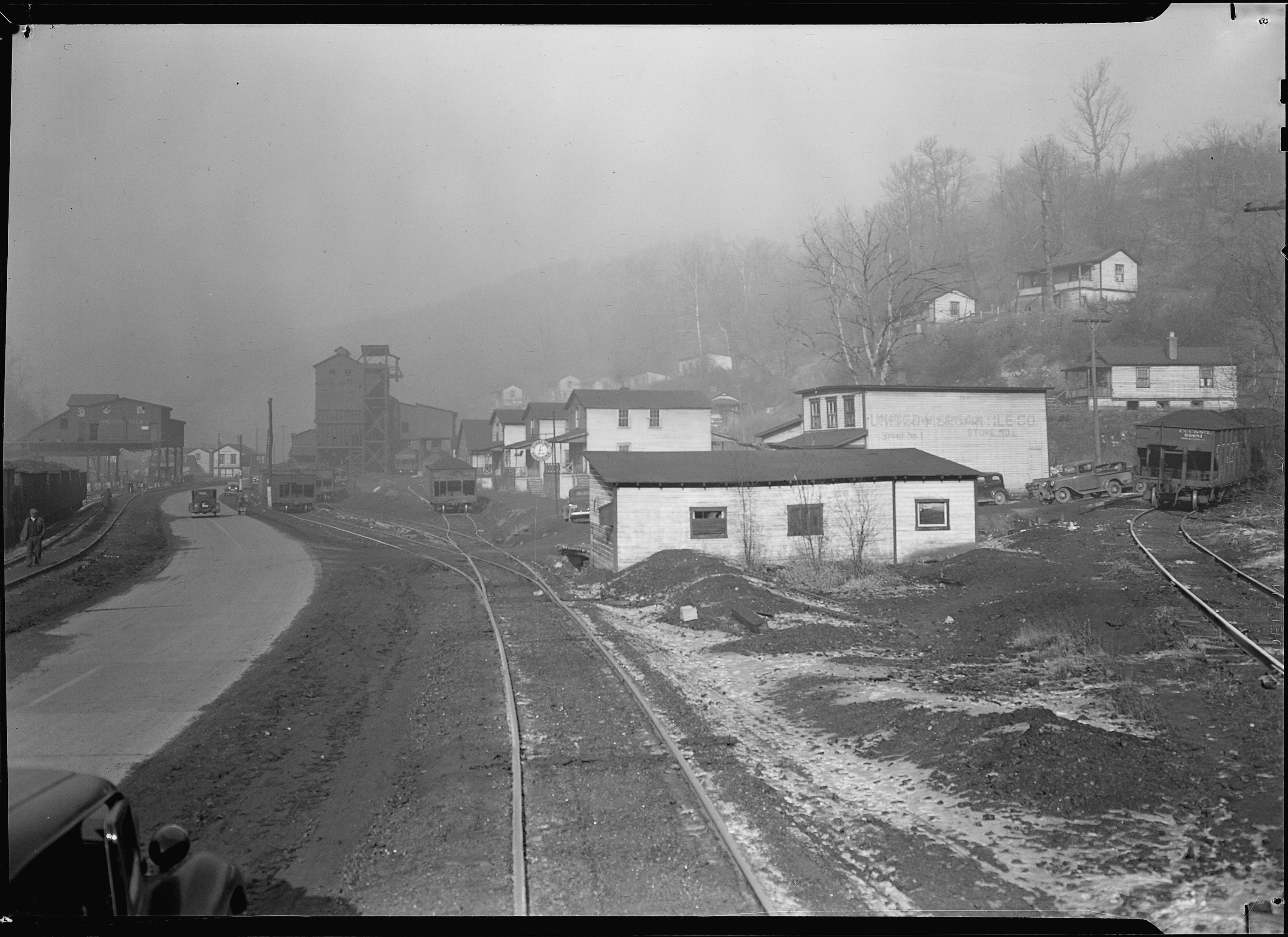
- Pursglove in 1937.

- Location within West Virginia Location within the United States
- Coordinates: 39°40′03″N 80°01′34″W
- Country: United States
- State: West Virginia
- County: Monongalia
- Elevation: 925 ft (282 m)
- Time zone: UTC-5 (Eastern (EST))
  - Summer (DST): UTC-4 (EDT)
- ZIP code: 26546
- Area codes: 304 & 681
- GNIS feature ID: 1555424

Pursglove is an unincorporated community in Monongalia County, West Virginia, United States and one of the communities that make up the Scotts Run region. Pursglove is located on U.S. Route 19, 4.5 miles (7.2 km) northwest of downtown Morgantown. Pursglove has a post office with ZIP code 26546.

== Gallery of photos from Pursglove in the 1940s ==
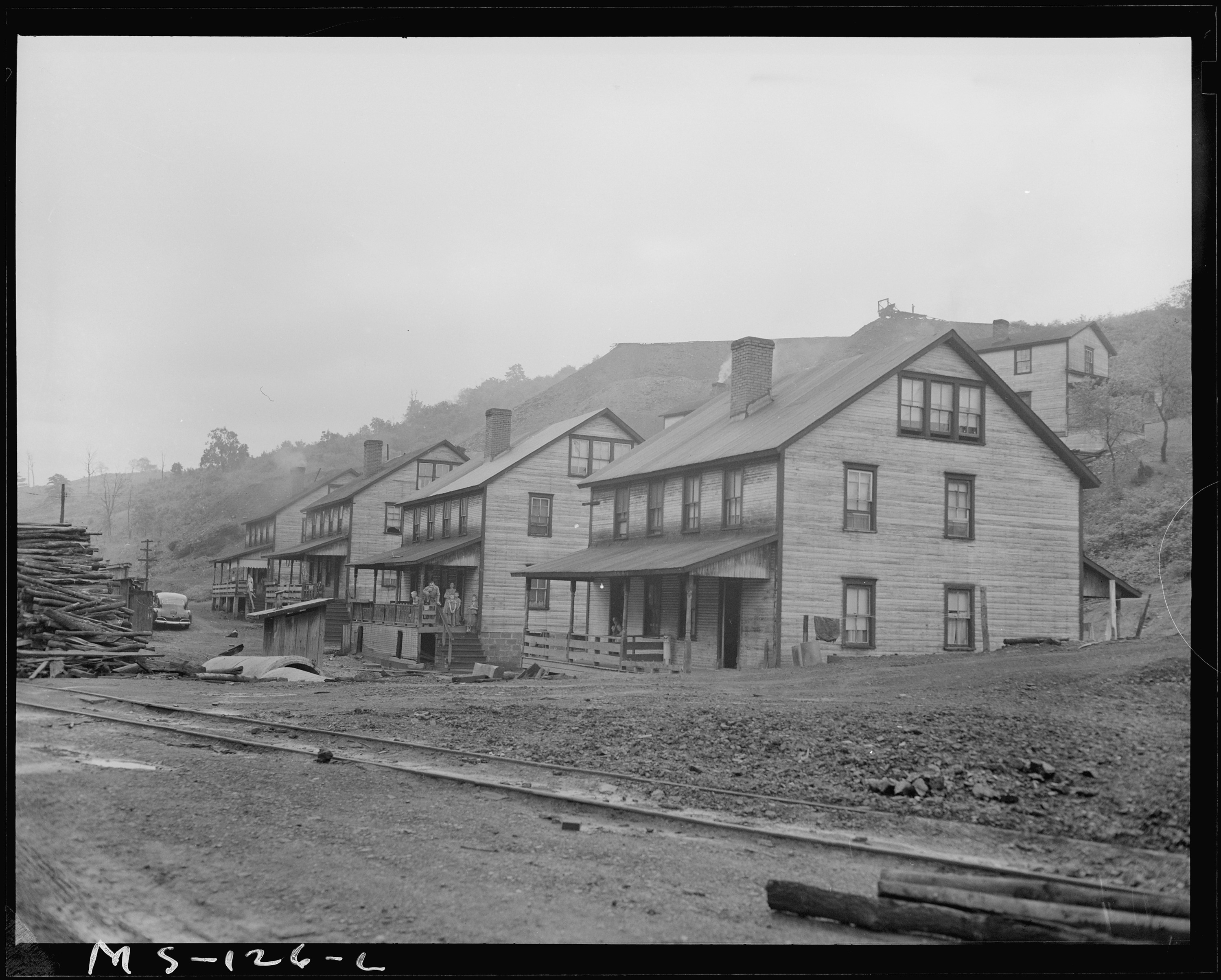
Pursglove #2 Mine housing

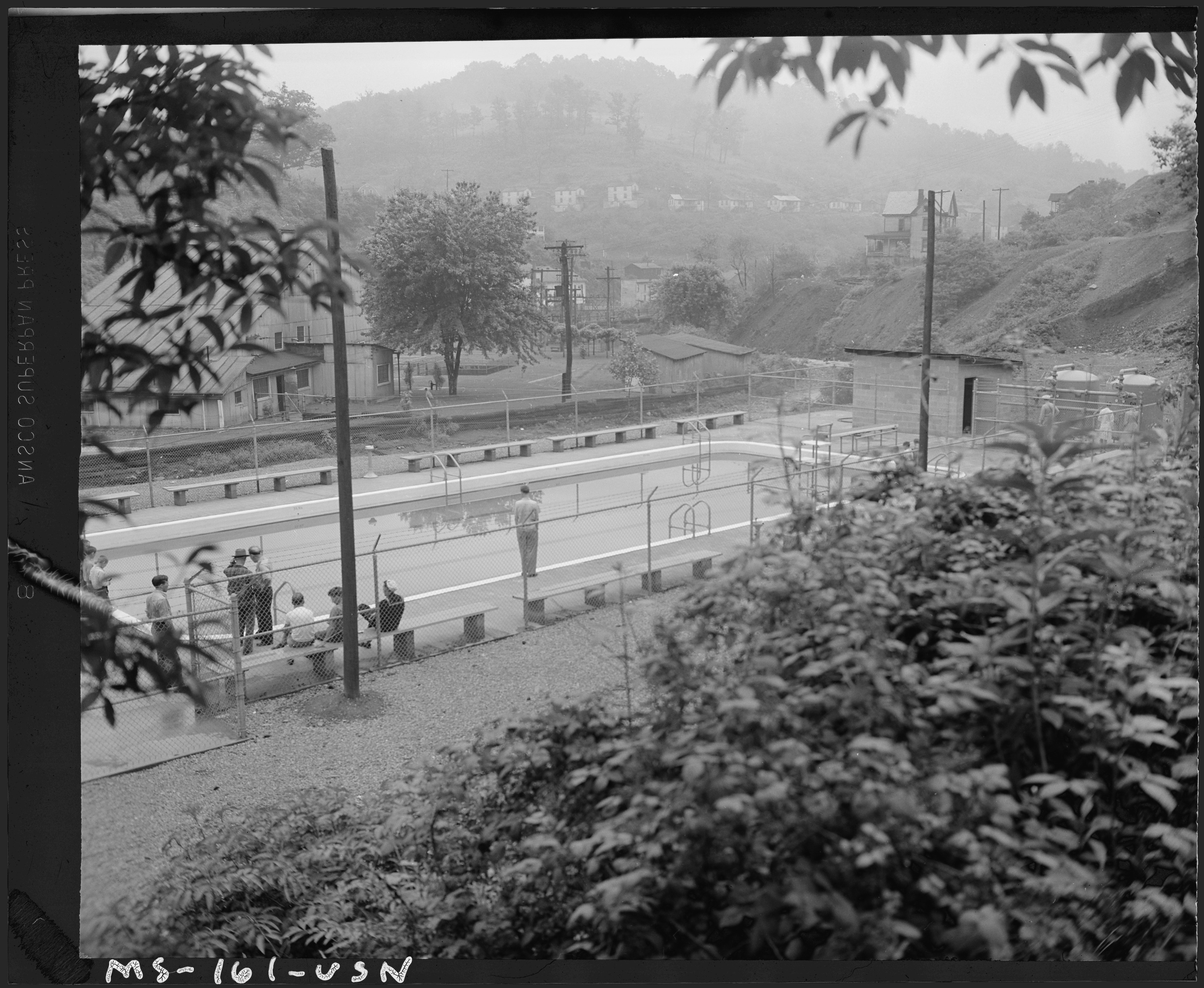
Miner's Memorial Swimming Pool

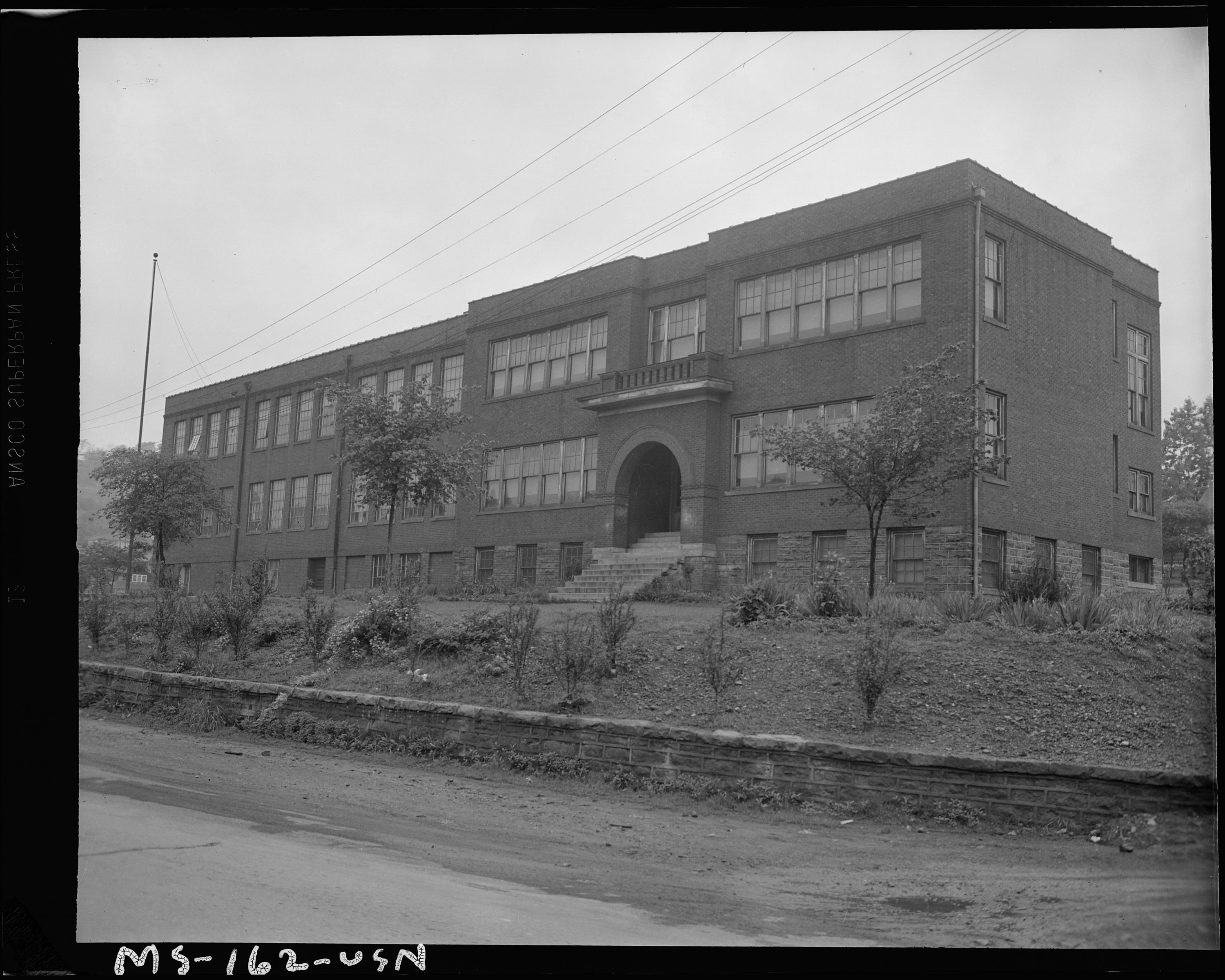
School, June 1946

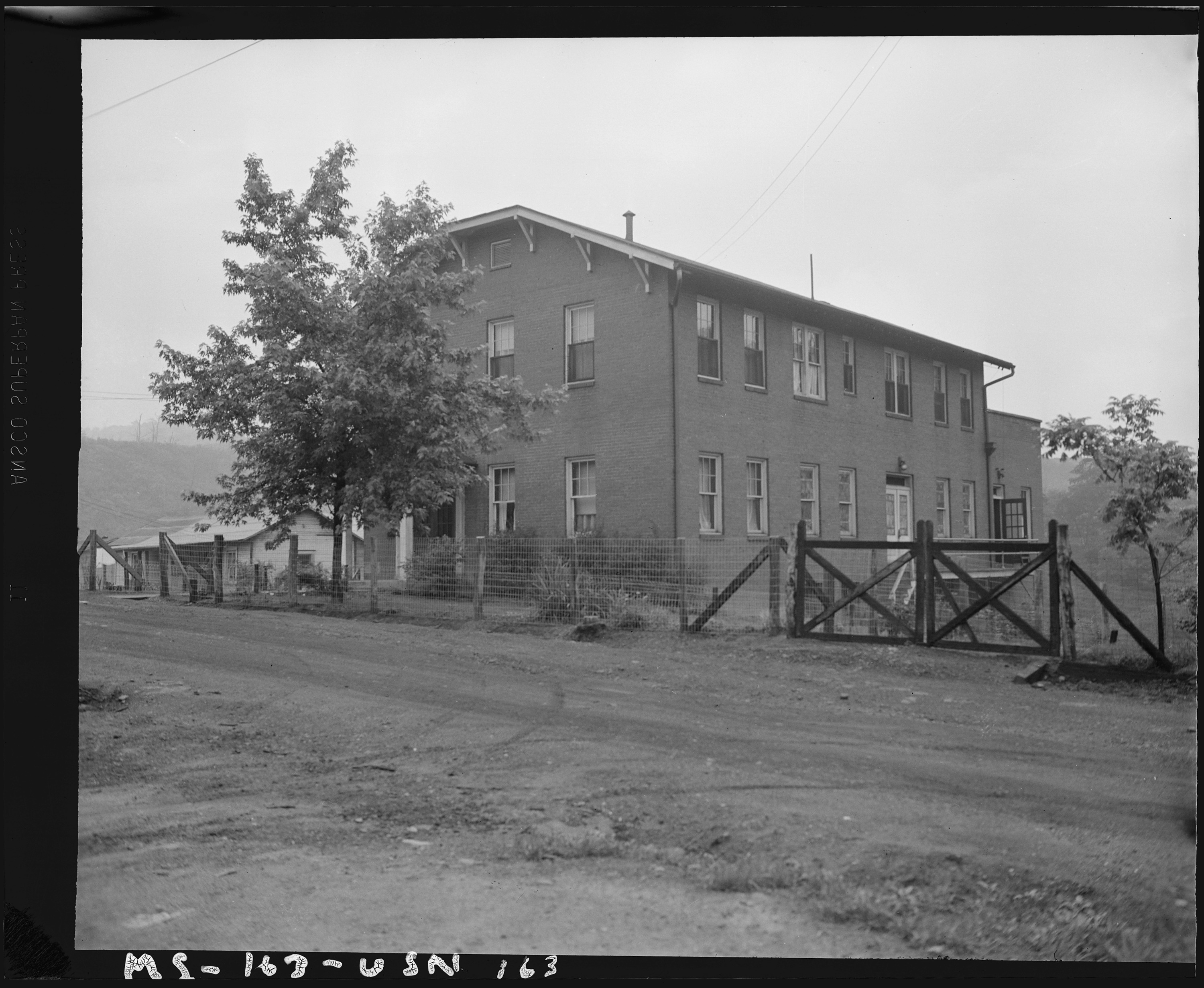
Settlement house

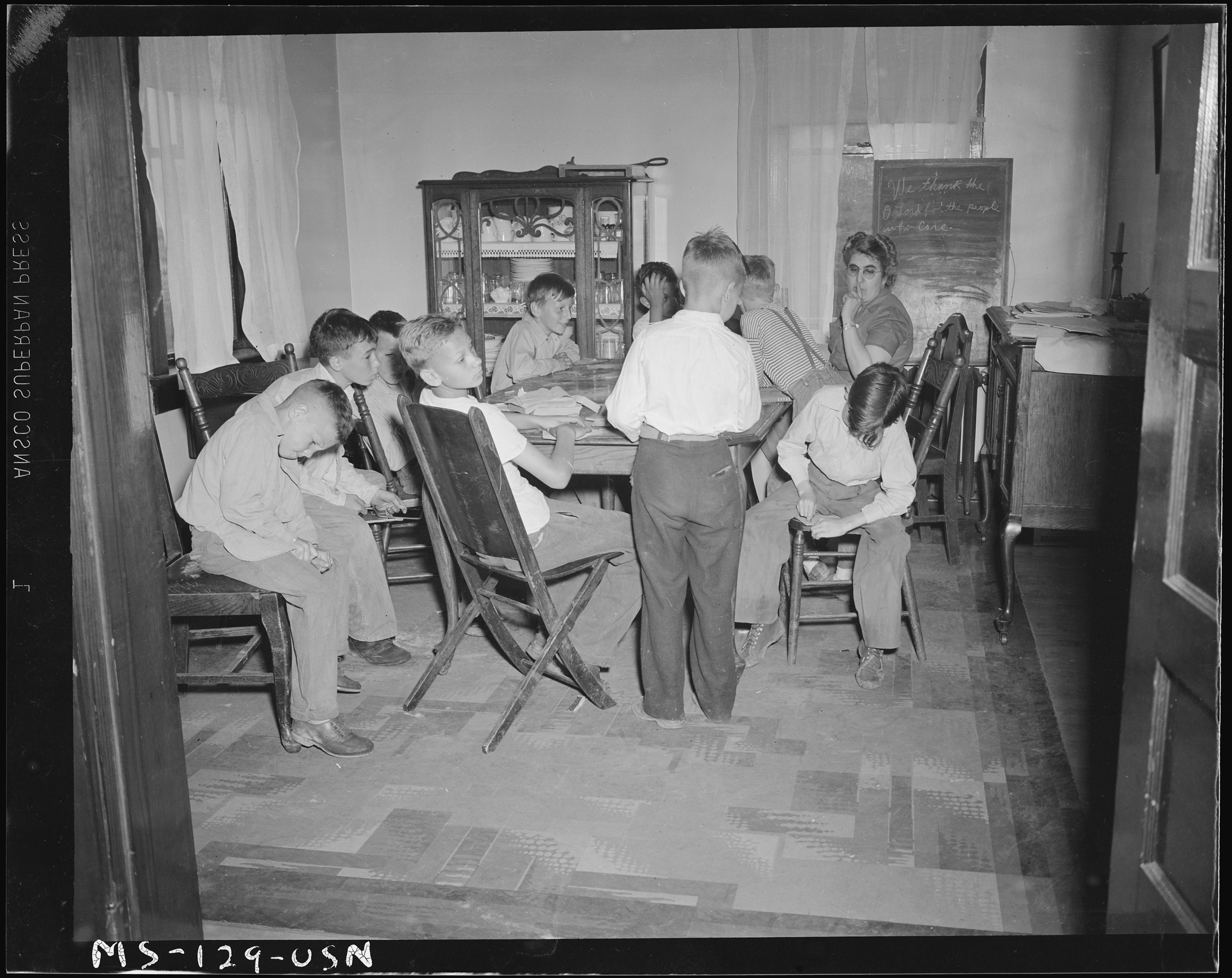
Sunday school in the house

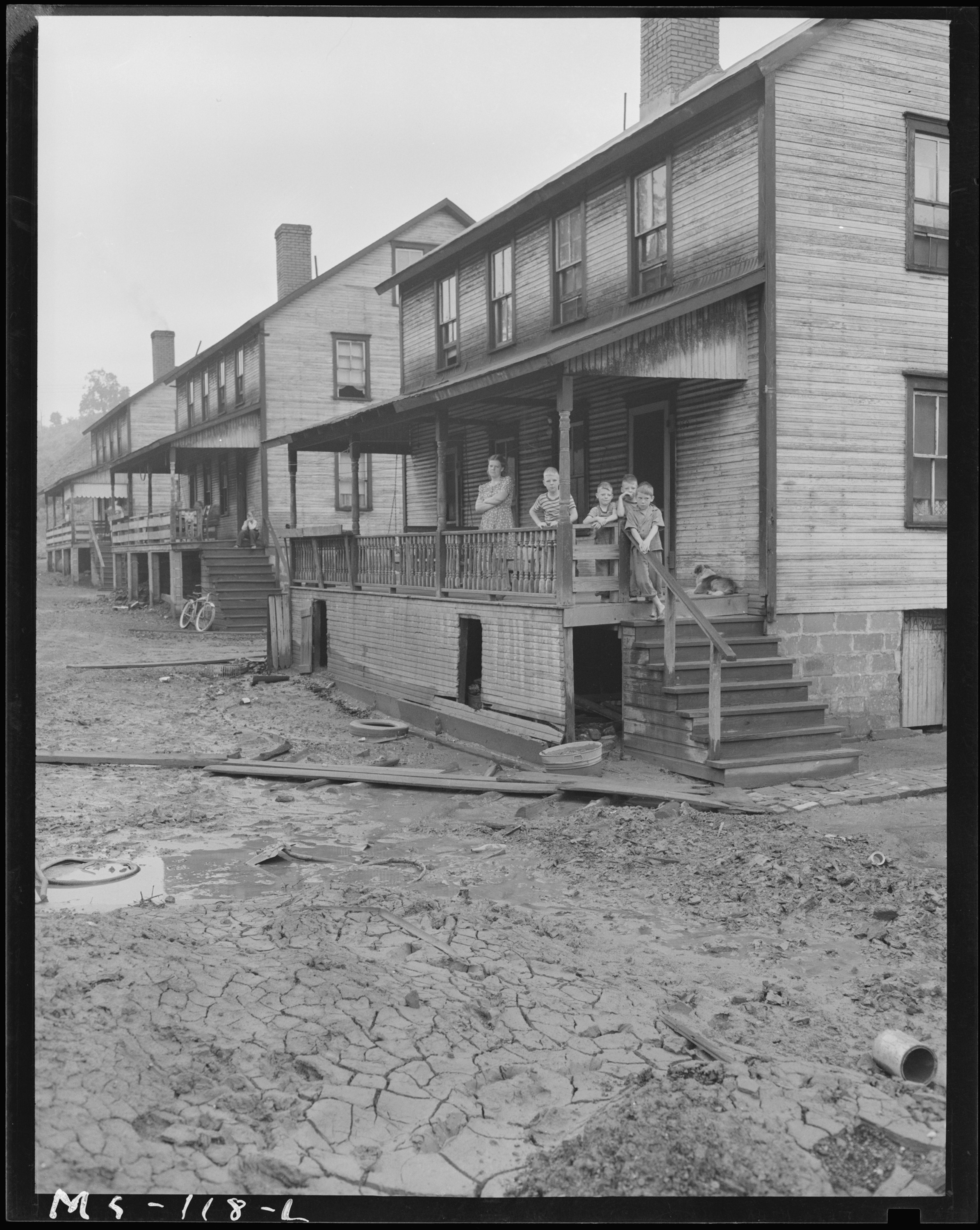
Children on porch after 1946 flood

== See also ==
- The Shack Neighborhood House
