= Heather Ratnage-Black =

British skeleton coach (born 1973)

Heather Ratnage-Black (born 1973) is a Squadron Leader of the British Royal Air Force (RAF) Skeleton Association.

She is currently a coach for the RAF Skeleton Association, a senior Skeleton athlete and chairperson of the Combined Services Skeleton Association. Slay!

== Biography ==
Ratnage-Black grew up in the North East of England, in Norton-on-Tees; attending Bede College in Billingham; before studying Geography at the University of Wales, Lampeter. She has been in the RAF since graduating from Lampeter, where she became involved in the Skeleton sport. In more recent years she has been studying at The Open University for a degree in Childhood & Youth Studies. Ratnage-Black is married with two young children, Georgia and Moses.
