= Bede Sixth Form College =

Sixth-form college in County Durham, England

Location
- Marsh House Avenue; Billingham, County Durham, TS23 3HB; England; 54°37′01″N 1°16′56″W

Information
- Type: Sixth form college
- Established: 1962 (as Billingham Campus)
- Local authority: Stockton-on-Tees LEA, North East England LSC
- Department for Education URN: 128519 Tables
- Ofsted: Reports
- Gender: Coeducational
- Age: 16 to 19
- Enrolment: c.500
- Former names: Billingham Campus, Bede College
- Website: www.stockton.ac.uk/bede/

Bede Sixth Form College is a further education sixth-form college, based in Billingham, County Durham, England. The college provides A-Level, vocational courses, apprenticeship training, and higher education courses. It is a TASS accredited college, with a dedicated sports centre situated on its site.

It was established in 1972, following a reorganisation of various schools on the Billingham Campus site. The college took its name from the famous Northumbrian scholar The Venerable Bede. It merged with Stockton Riverside College in May 2008. The college group now also includes Redcar and Cleveland College, NETA Training and The Skills Academy, it is known as the Education Training Collective (Etc.).

== History ==
Three halls of the site was built in 1962 by George Wimpey as Billingham Campus on 50 acres (200,000 m^{2}) for Teesside Education Committee. The first hall had been built in 1958. It included a five form-entry co-educational grammar-technical school, Bede Hall Grammar School (which included a sixth form), and 3 secondary modern schools 'Faraday Hall', 'Davy Hall' and 'Stephenson Hall'(an older school on Hale Road Billingham). In 1965 it was agreed to combine the whole site into one comprehensive school which took place in the early 1970s. Bede Hall Grammar school was renamed Brunner school but would later be demolished. The older building 'Stephenson Hall' became 'Bede 6th Form college'. Brunner Hall, Faraday Hall and Davy Hall became Billingham Campus, an 11-16 comprehensive school.

=== Sixth form college ===
Bede Sixth Form College left Cleveland County Council control on 1 April 1993, and was funded by the Further Education Funding Council for England until 2001 when funded by North East LSC. It merged with Stockton Riverside College in May 2008. The new buildings and sport centre were built by Morgan Ashurst, who won the contract in July 2008 and was officially opened in 2009.

== Activities ==
The Bede College Choir sang "Dear Lord and Father of Mankind" in the film Atonement, which won an Academy Award for Best Original Music Score in 2007.

== Courses ==
=== AS and A level ===
A level and A level equivalent courses include:

- Applied Law
- Applied Science
- Art & Design
- Biology
- Business Studies
- Chemistry
- Classical Civilisation
- Computer Science
- Creative Media Production
- Criminology
- Economics
- English Language
- English Literature
- Film Studies
- Further Mathematics
- Geography
- Government & Politics
- Health & Social Care
- History
- Law
- Mathematics
- Media Studies
- Music Technology
- Performing Arts
- Photography
- Physics
- Psychology
- Religion, Philosophy and Ethics
- Sociology
- Sport & Exercise Science

=== Full-time vocational courses ===
- Public Services
- Sport & Exercise Science

== Notable alumni ==
The following list is of notable ex pupils:

- Matt Cowley – Professional Drummer.
- Heather Black – Prominent member of the RAF Skeleton Association
- Tim Matthews – race car driver
