= Stockton Riverside College =

FE college in North Yorkshire, England

Location
- Corporation Road; Thornaby, Stockton-on-Tees, North Yorkshire, TS17 6FZ; England
- Coordinates: 54.5624°N 1.2991°W

Information
- Type: Education
- Local authority: Stockton-on-Tees
- Principal: Rebecca Cadden
- Website: www.stockton.ac.uk

Stockton Riverside College is a further education college located in Thornaby-on-Tees, North Yorkshire, England. The college offers vocational courses, apprenticeship training, higher education and professional courses.

It is part of the Education Training Collective, including Redcar and Cleveland College, Bede Sixth Form College and NETA Training. The college is a partner of the Teesside University College Partnership (TUCP).
