= The Shack Neighborhood House =

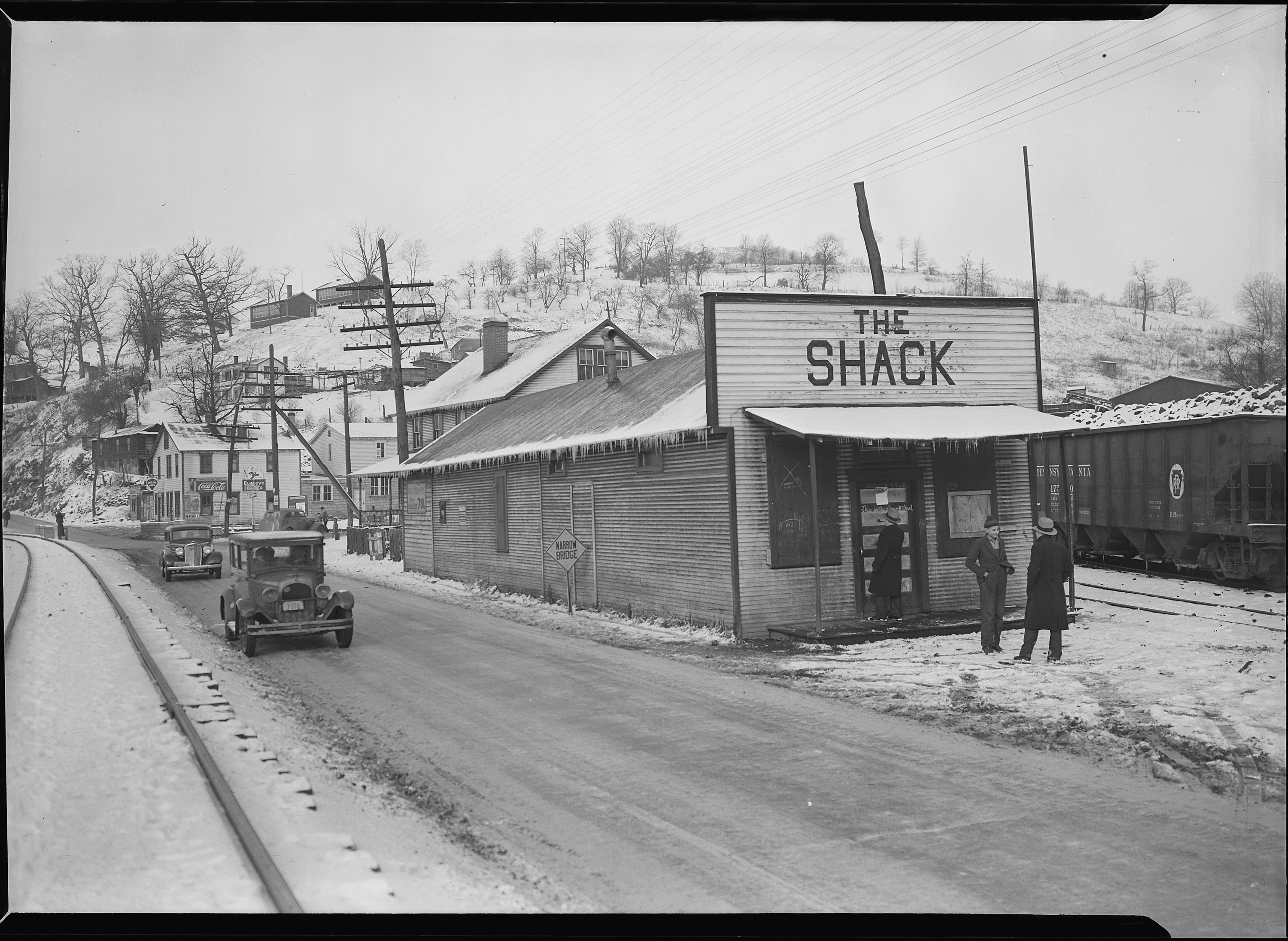
The Shack Community Center in the 1930s

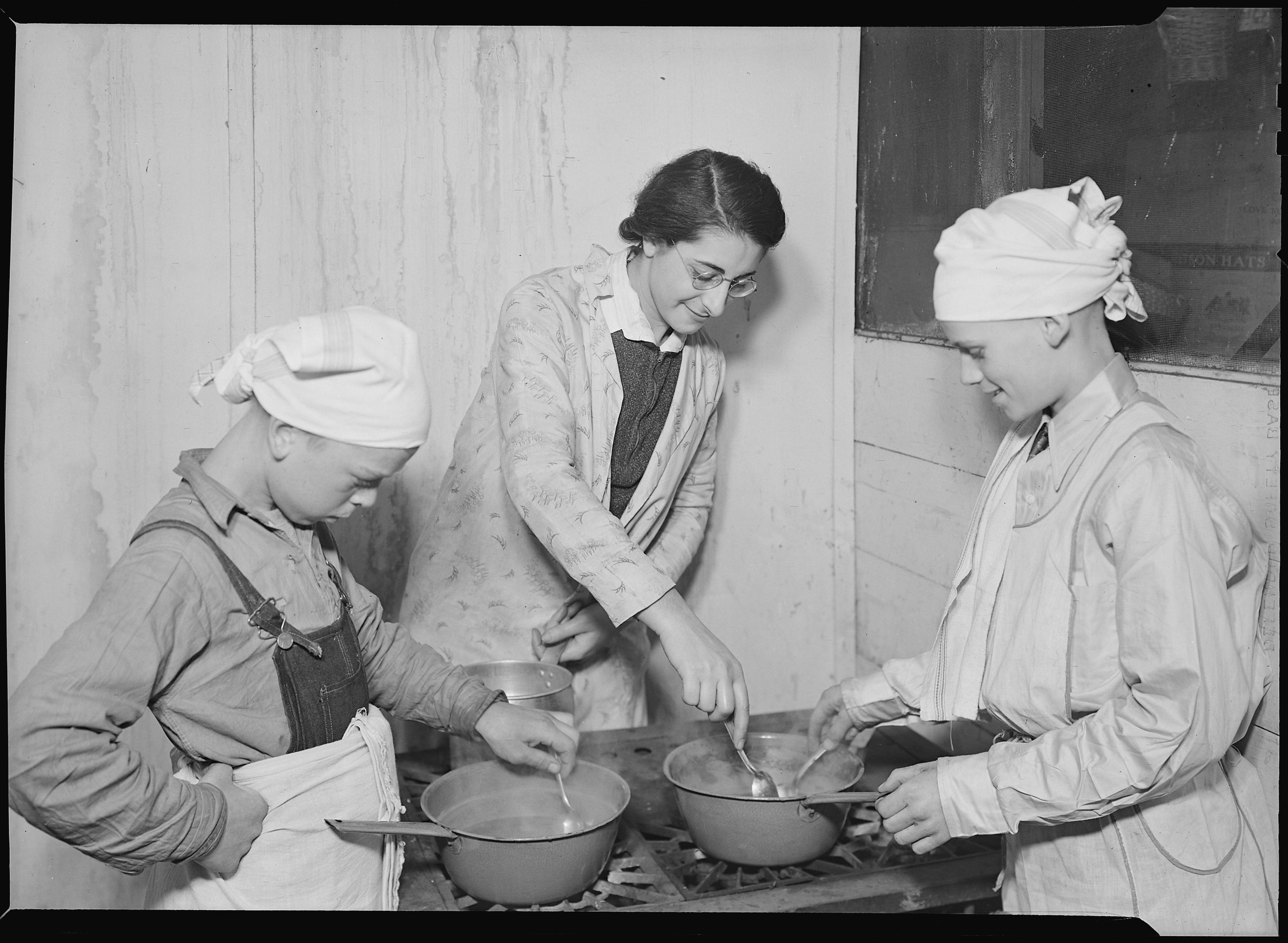
The Shack in 1937 photograph by Lewis Hine

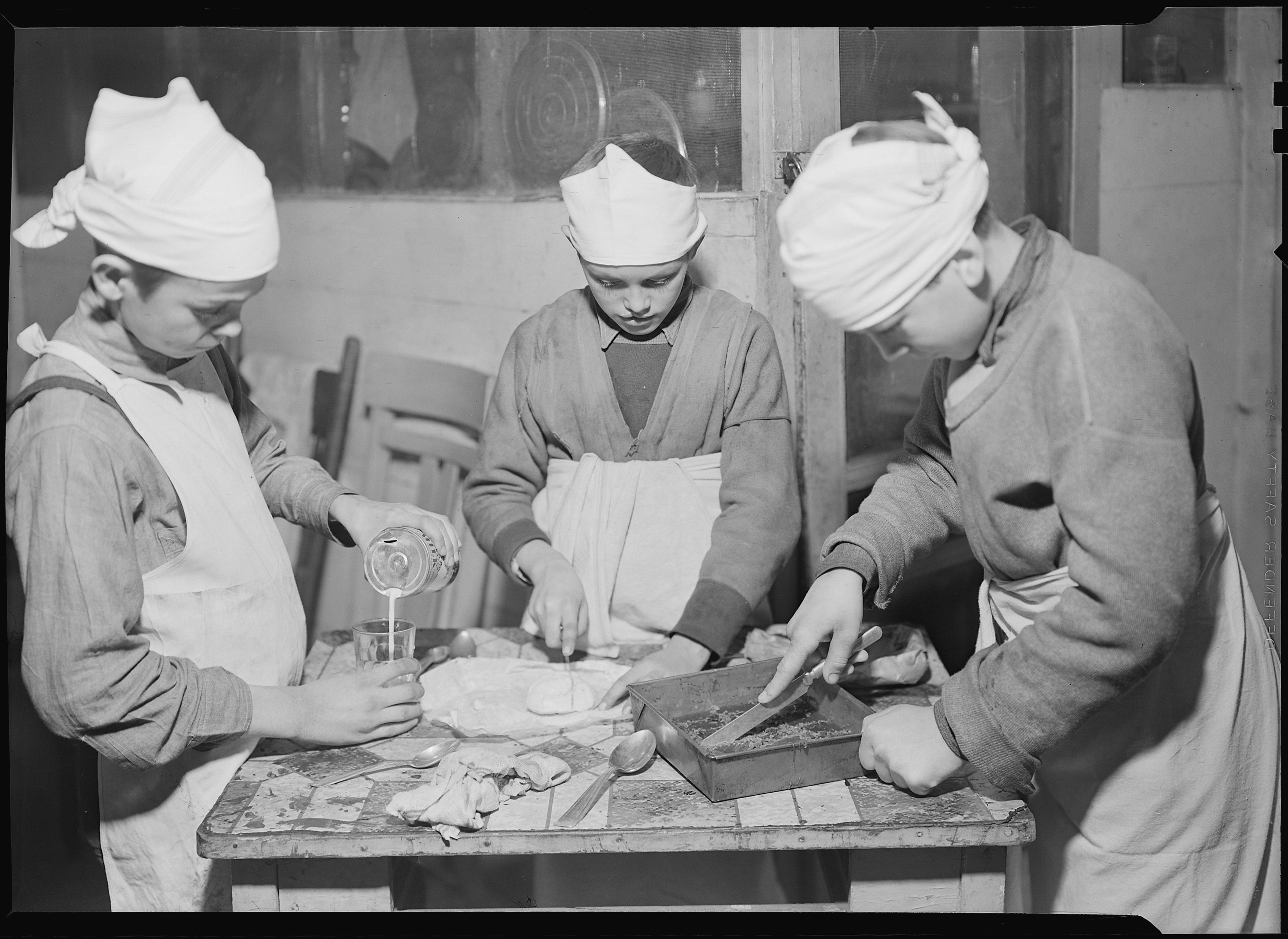
The Shack in 1937 photograph by Lewis Hine

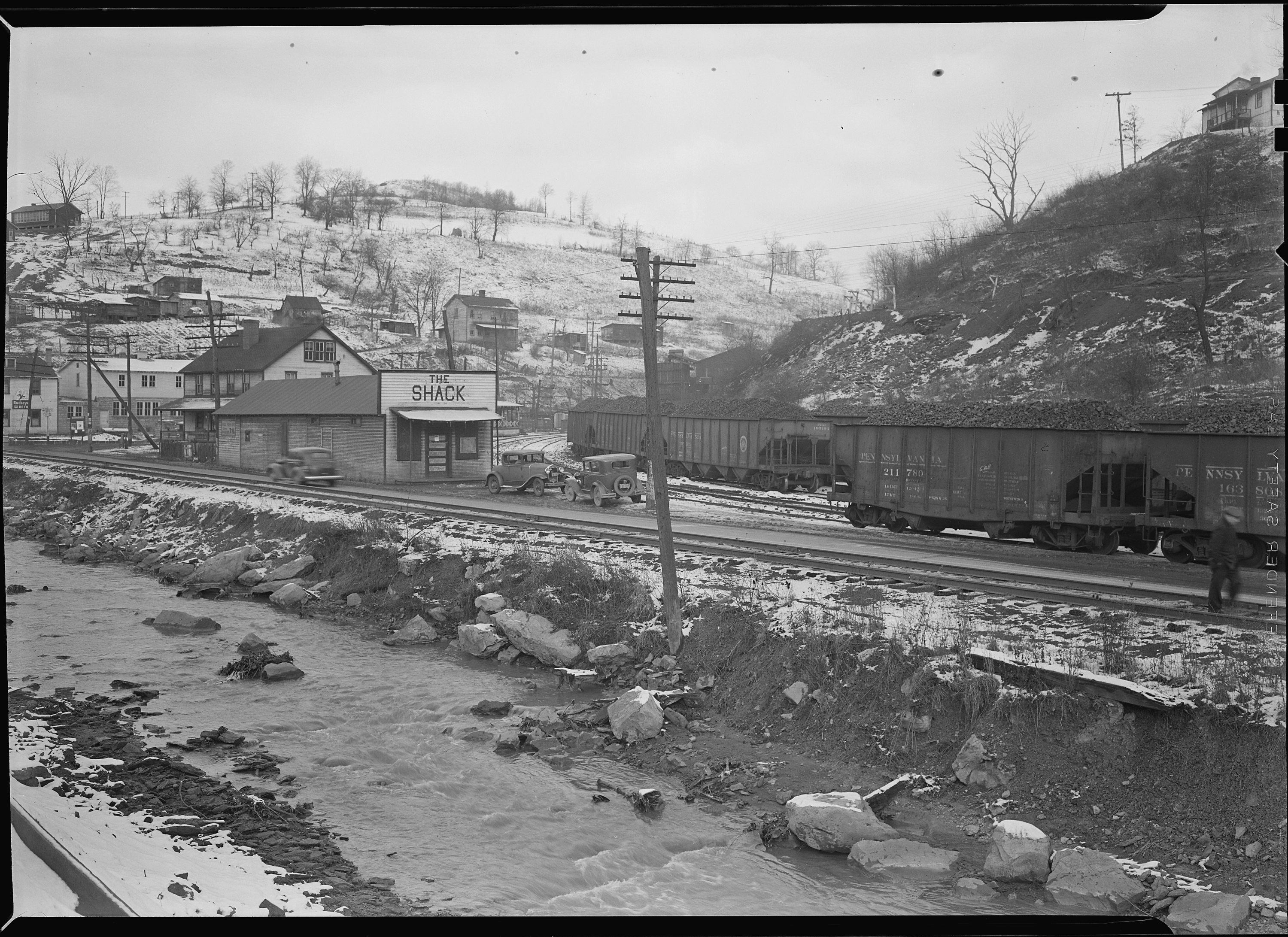
Coal cars by The Shack Community Center in the 1930s

The Shack Neighborhood House serves the people of the once-thriving Appalachian coal mining community of Scotts Run, northwest of Morgantown, West Virginia. Founded by Mary E. Behner in the tradition of the settlement house movement, "The Shack" continues to serve their social, educational, recreational, economic, and health needs.

== History ==
Sponsored by mission the First Presbyterian Church in Morgantown and the church's National Board of Missions, "The Shack" sought to meet the spiritual as well as the social and physical needs of coal miners and their families. During the Great Depression, Eleanor Roosevelt visited "The Shack" and the especially hard hit Scotts Run area. Nearly two-thirds of the area's residents were suffering in terrible poverty. There were 10,000 people and 22 different nationalities clustered on hills and near polluted creeks along the nine miles of eight communities.

Mary Behner, a 1928 College of Wooster graduate, was first given an abandoned schoolhouse in Stumptown and started a Sunday School and recreation there in November 1928. But soon children were coming to her without food and clothes. She expanded into social service. Hundreds attended her programs. She brought nearby West Virginia University students to teach. She started a library, charm school, choruses, sewing club, and the first integrated nursery school.

In 1932, she received from the coal company an abandoned company store which she named The Shack. The Quakers and other agencies handled relief programs from The Shack. She started the Uhyscool Club to encourage the first students to finish high school and college. The area was photographed by Lewis Hine, Ben Shahn and Walker Evans. The Shack was written up in the Christian Science Monitor and other publications. Behner left in 1937 to be married. Her diaries and photos are located at the West Virginia & Regional History Center at West Virginia University Libraries.

A new Shack building was finished in 1938 west of the original site and a third building down the same Route 7 which exists today. On May 6, 2008, an historical marker was placed near the original site, along a now widened Route 7 in Pursglove. Her daughter, Bettijane Christopher Burger, of Charleston, WV, petitioned the state for the marker. Most of the mines are closed and the hills returned to grassy slopes.

In 2006, The Shack received an outreach grant from the Mollohan Foundation for the Appalachian Rags to Rugs Program.

Even though the religious mission of "The Shack" ended when the church planted there by the Presbyterian Church (USA) had closed, it continued to operate with support from the PC(USA), other denominations, the United Way, and generous donors. Their address is Box 600, Pursglove, WV 26546-0600.

== Programs ==
- After school care and tutoring
- Teen Time
- Emergency supplies
- Rags to Rugs
- Home repair/work camp
- Family Fun Night
- Make a Difference Day
- Happy School
- Festival of Fun/Summer Nutrition
- Swimming lessons
- Junior Volunteer/Community Service
