= Scotts Run, West Virginia =

Scotts Run
- Unincorporated community
- Location within the state of West Virginia Scotts Run (the United States)
- Coordinates: 39°40′1″N 80°2′56″W
- Country: United States
- State: West Virginia
- County: Monongalia
- Elevation: 971 ft (296 m)
- Time zone: UTC-5 (Eastern (EST))
  - Summer (DST): UTC-4 (EDT)
- GNIS ID: 2749914

Scotts Run is a geographical division of the Cass District in Monongalia County, West Virginia, United States. Currently, it encompasses thirteen small, unincorporated communities. Located a few miles from Morgantown, this area's predominant industry in the early twentieth century was coal mining and production. Scotts Run became well known nationally during the years of the Great Depression, when photographers and the relief efforts of First Lady Eleanor Roosevelt publicized the impoverished conditions faced by the community. Since the decline in the coal industry in the area, Scotts Run's population has rapidly decreased. However, the current community is active in revitalization efforts to promote new businesses and heritage tourism.

== Pre-Industrial history ==
In the late 19th century, Scotts Run's primary industry was agriculture. The population was largely homogeneous, consisting of American-born white farmers who owned small plots of land. Because the hillsides were unsuitable for most crops, the farmers of the Cass District mostly raised livestock, particularly sheep and cattle. Farmers were primarily forced out of the area because of high land prices after the coal fields began to be developed.

Geologist William Barton Rogers conducted the first surveys of the coal producing potential of the area in 1836. By 1902, two companies had purchased land near the mouth of the Run. However, the lack of a railroad outlet slowed the development of the area, until the Morgantown and Wheeling Railroad was completed in 1916. Demand for coal produced by World War I contributed to the rush to develop the coal field.

== Coal boom ==
Scotts Run is part of the Fairmont Coal Field, which is on the Pittsburgh coal seam. The large Pittsburgh seam was known as "the most valuable mineral deposit in the world". During the years from 1917 to 1932, between World War I and the Great Depression, the Scotts Run area faced rapid industrialization and intense development of the bituminous coal industry. Despite geographic limitations, the area's development was one of the fastest in the nation. During this 15-year period, at least 60 mines operated in the area.

Development also brought about changes in Scotts Run's population. The industry's rapid expansion resulted in a labor shortage, which was filled by a flood of workers moving into the area. Not only was the population steadily increasing, it was also becoming much more diverse. Many of the people moving into the area were immigrants and African Americans. By 1930, 13 percent of Cass District's population were immigrants, while another 13 percent were African American. These new residents provided a secure labor force for mining expansion.

The development of the Scotts Run area coincided with the mechanization process of the 1920s. The emergence of coal-loading machines and gathering locomotives replaced hand-loading and mules.

Scotts Run's largest boom year was 1923, during which 37 mines from 33 different companies actively operated. However, the overextended industry was in steady decline from 1923 until the beginning of the Great Depression in 1929.

== Great Depression era ==
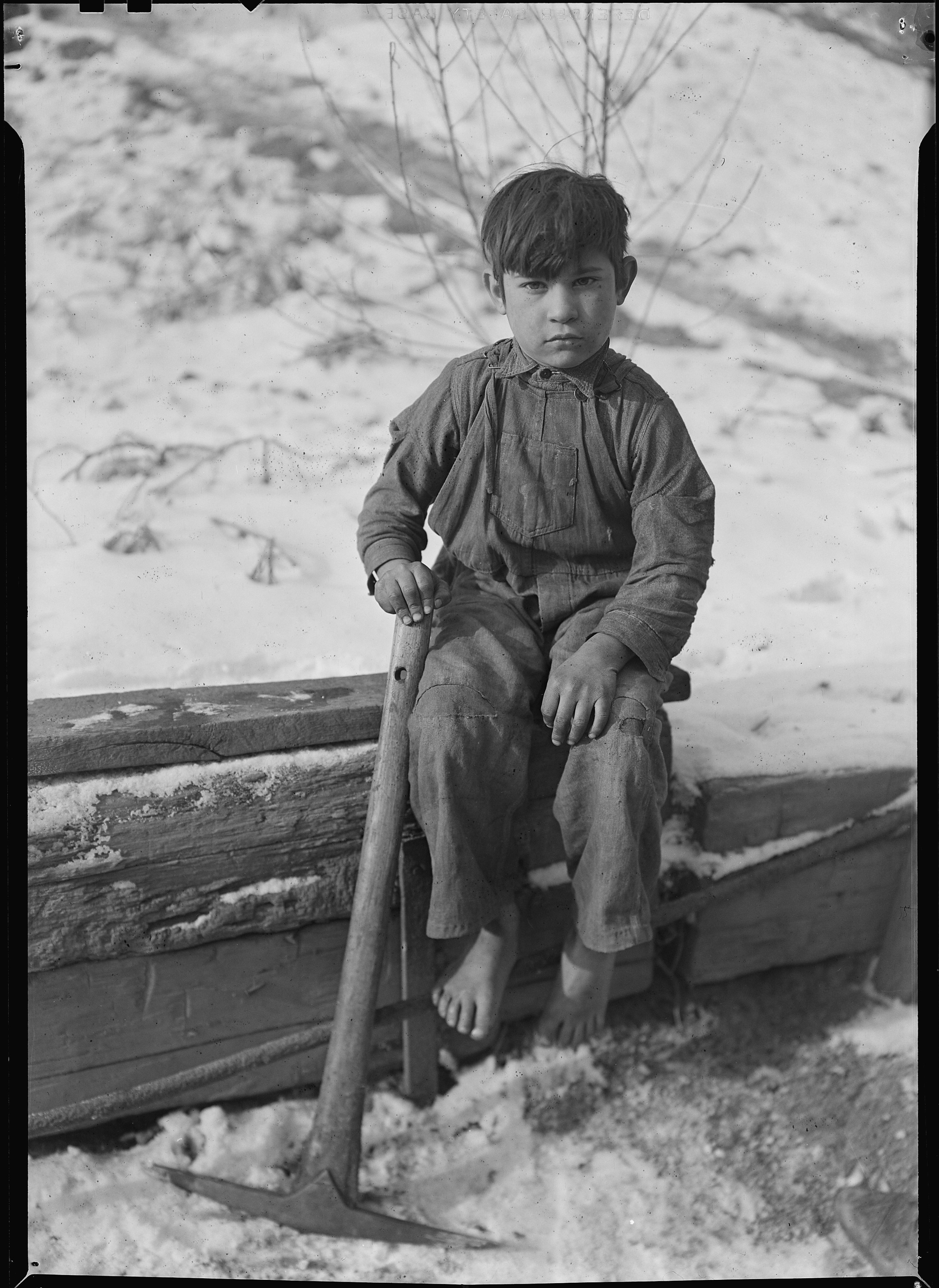
Barefoot miner's child digging coal from mine refuse on the roadside (December 23, 1936)

The coaling industry, in comparison to the boom of the 1920s, had basically collapsed by 1932. Already suffering, the industry could not sustain the economic downturn brought about by the Stock Market Crash of 1929. Residents of Scotts Run not only suffered from unemployment, but also from ethnic and racial prejudice and limited educational opportunities.

The rampant poverty in Scotts Run attracted the attention of Protestant missionaries and the American Friends Service Committee in 1931. Later in 1933, the Roosevelt administration sent relief workers. Scotts Run became America's image for the bleakness of the Great Depression. One writer for Atlantic Monthly declared that Scotts Run was “the damndest cesspool of human misery I have ever seen in America.” Although the suffering at Scotts Run was probably no different from that of other coal hollows in Appalachia, it garnered national attention because of its accessibility to photographers, reporters, social workers, and government officials through automobile and railroad.

First Lady Eleanor Roosevelt also brought national attention to the Run. Roosevelt first toured the mine camps of the area in 1933, and returned several times, forging long-term relationships. Following the first lady were media outlets and famous photographers such as Walker Evans, Marion Post Wolcott, and Ben Shahn. Eleanor Roosevelt's involvement culminated in the relocation of a number of families at the resettlement community of Arthurdale in nearby Preston County.

Local relief efforts also existed. The Scotts Run Settlement House, in existence since 1922, provided a large amount of assistance. Another example was Morgantown's First Presbyterian Church’s establishment of a missionary project for Scotts Run, which opened The Shack, a community center which eventually was used to start a co-op for supplemental farming.

The 1930s marked a steady decline in industrial work in Scotts Run. Many of the residents relocated, some to Arthurdale, and many of the younger male residents served in the armed forces during World War II and did not return to the area upon the war’s end.

=== National Research Project ===
In 1936–37, documentary photographer Lewis Hine created photo studies of 14 American industrial communities, including Scotts Run, for the National Research Project of the Works Progress Administration.

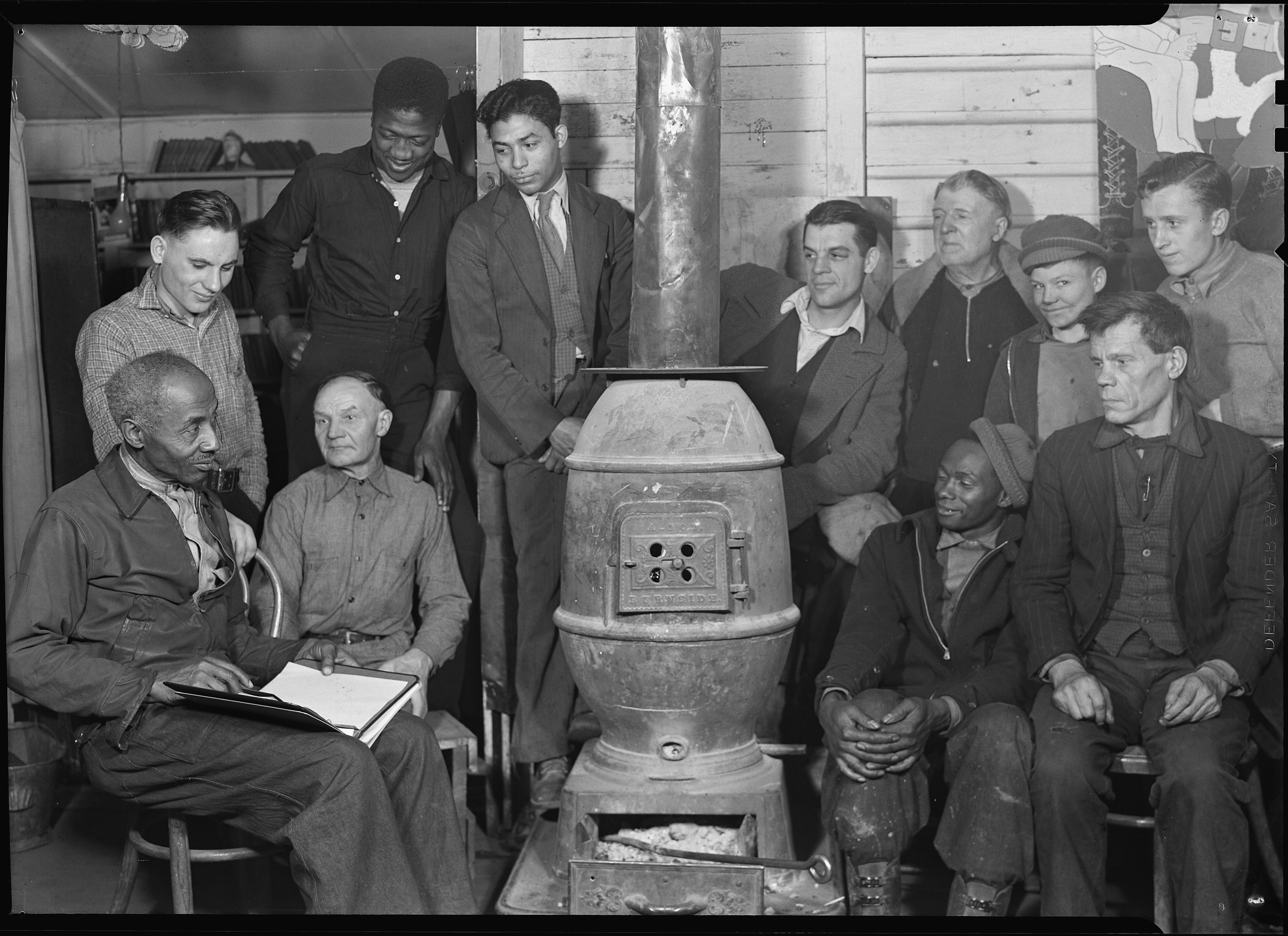
Unemployed men attend a meeting of the Workers Alliance Council in Scotts Run

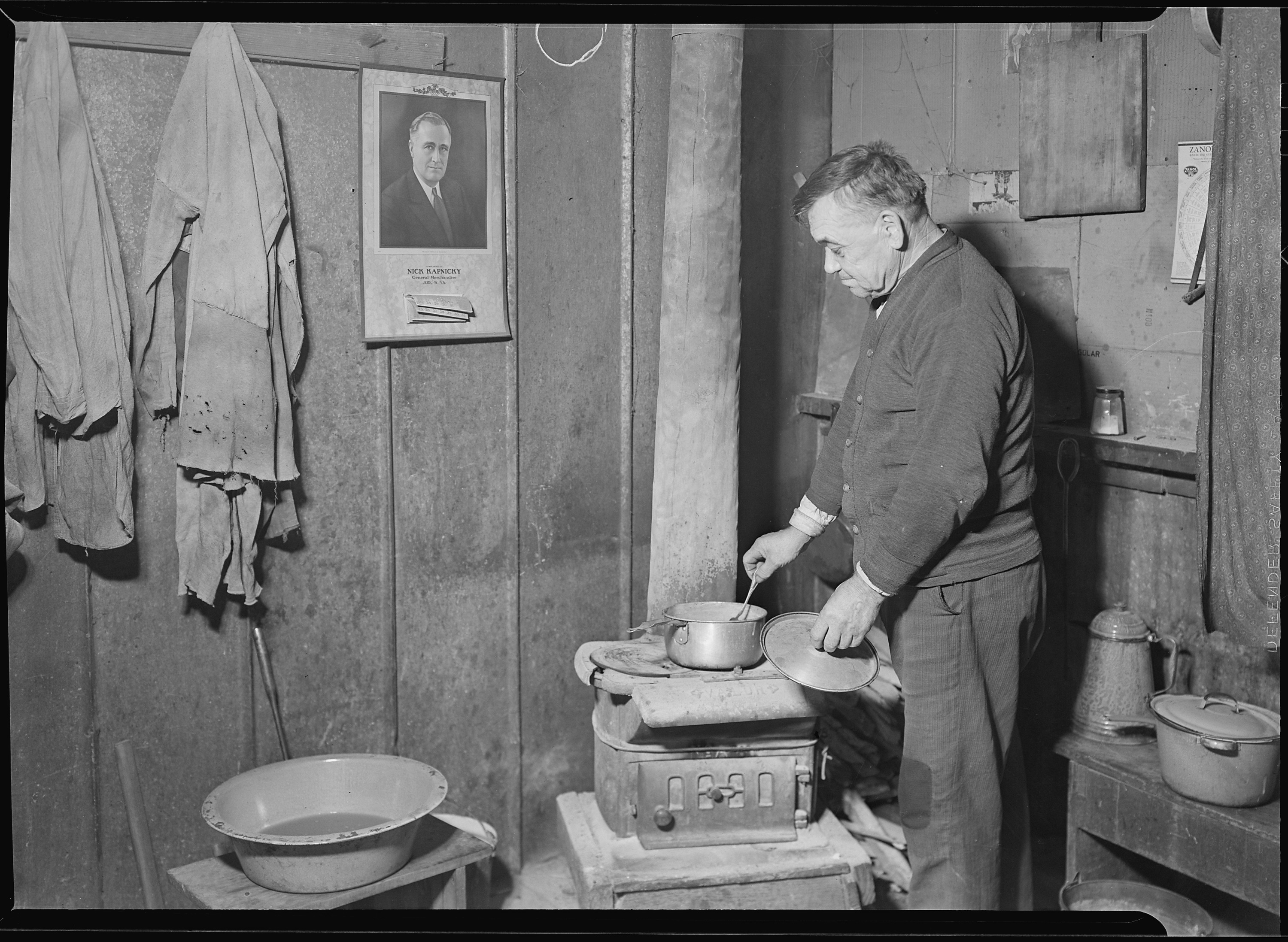
Unemployed miner in the abandoned Jere camp

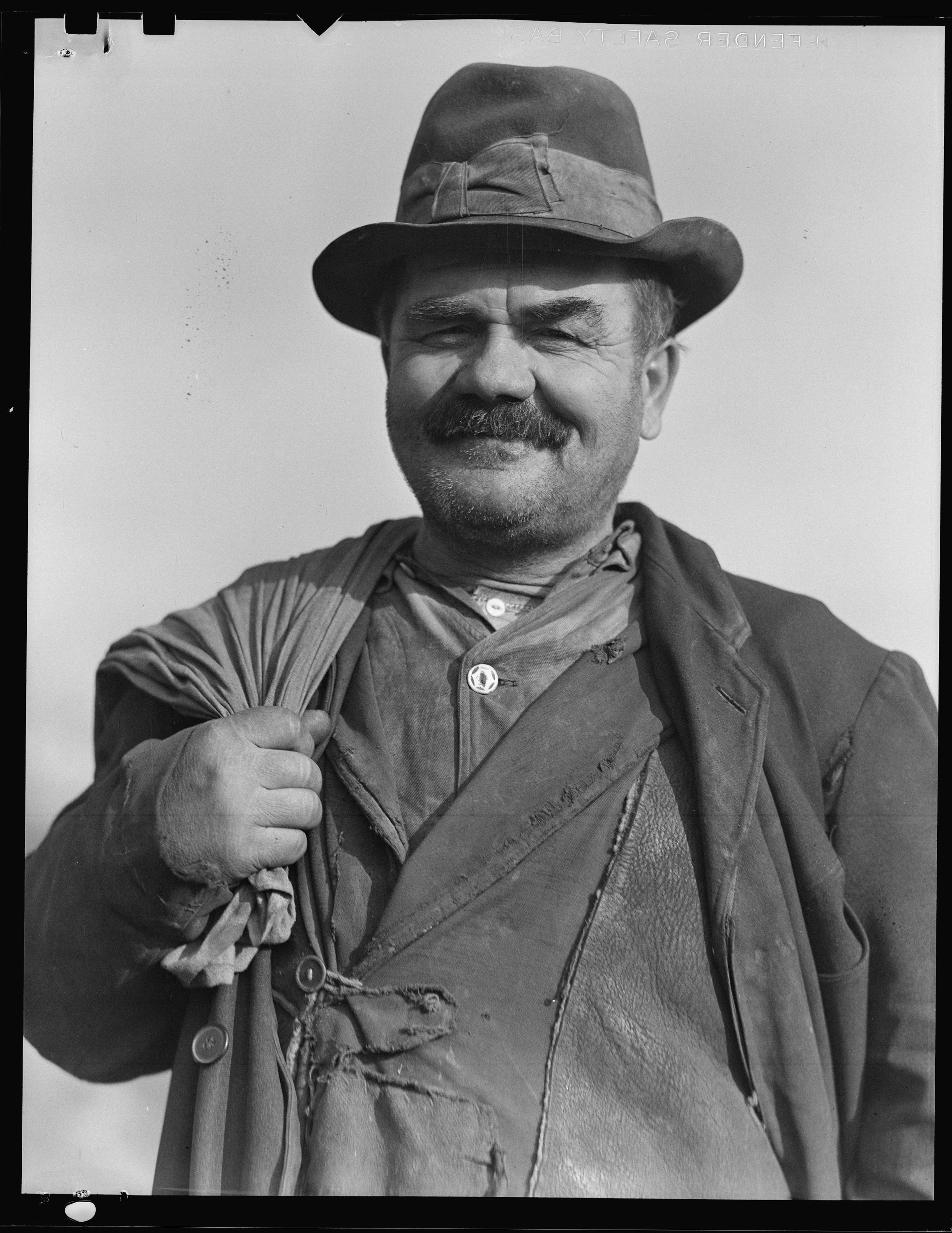
Romanian miner too old to work

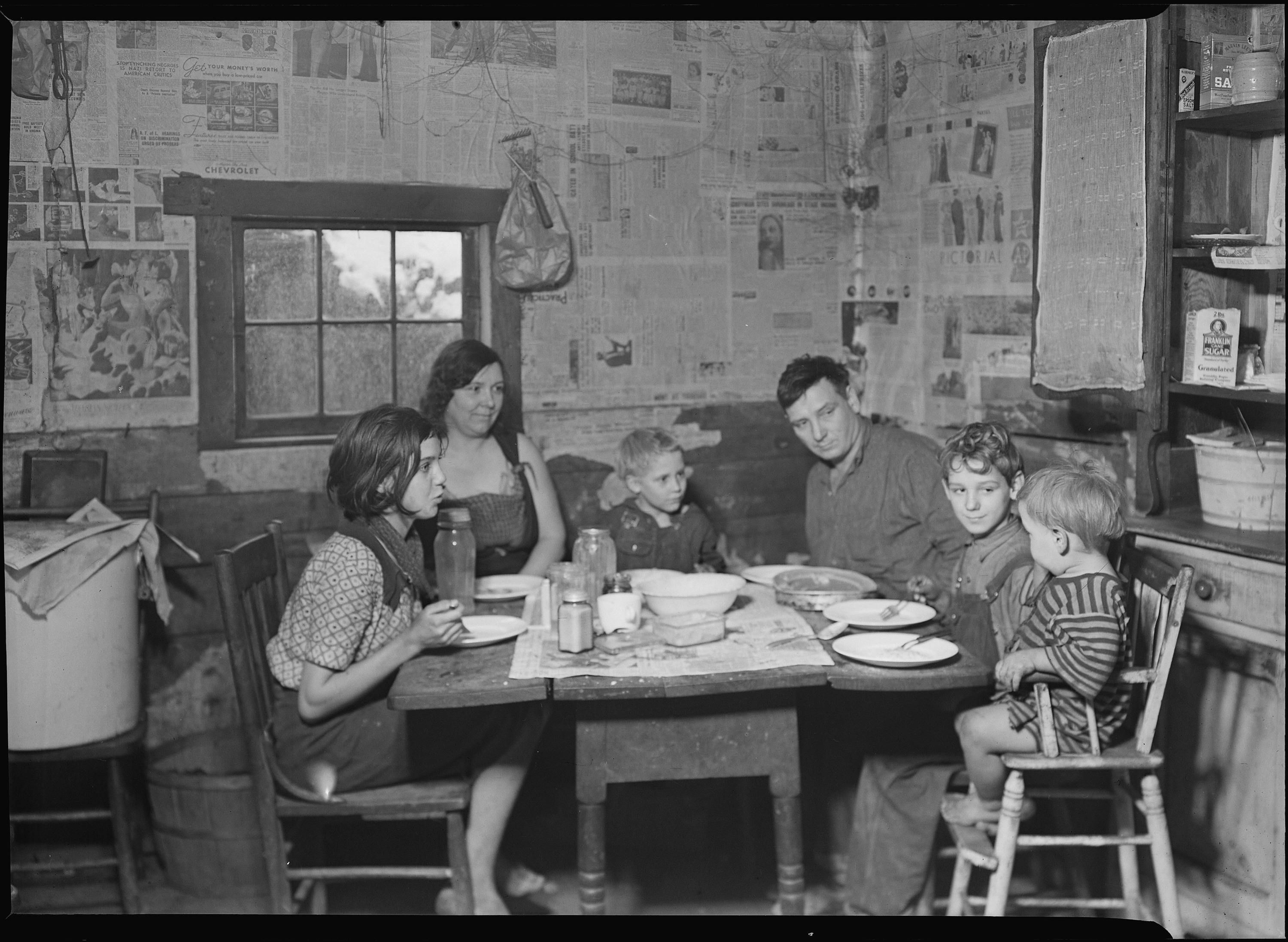
Mine mechanic and his family

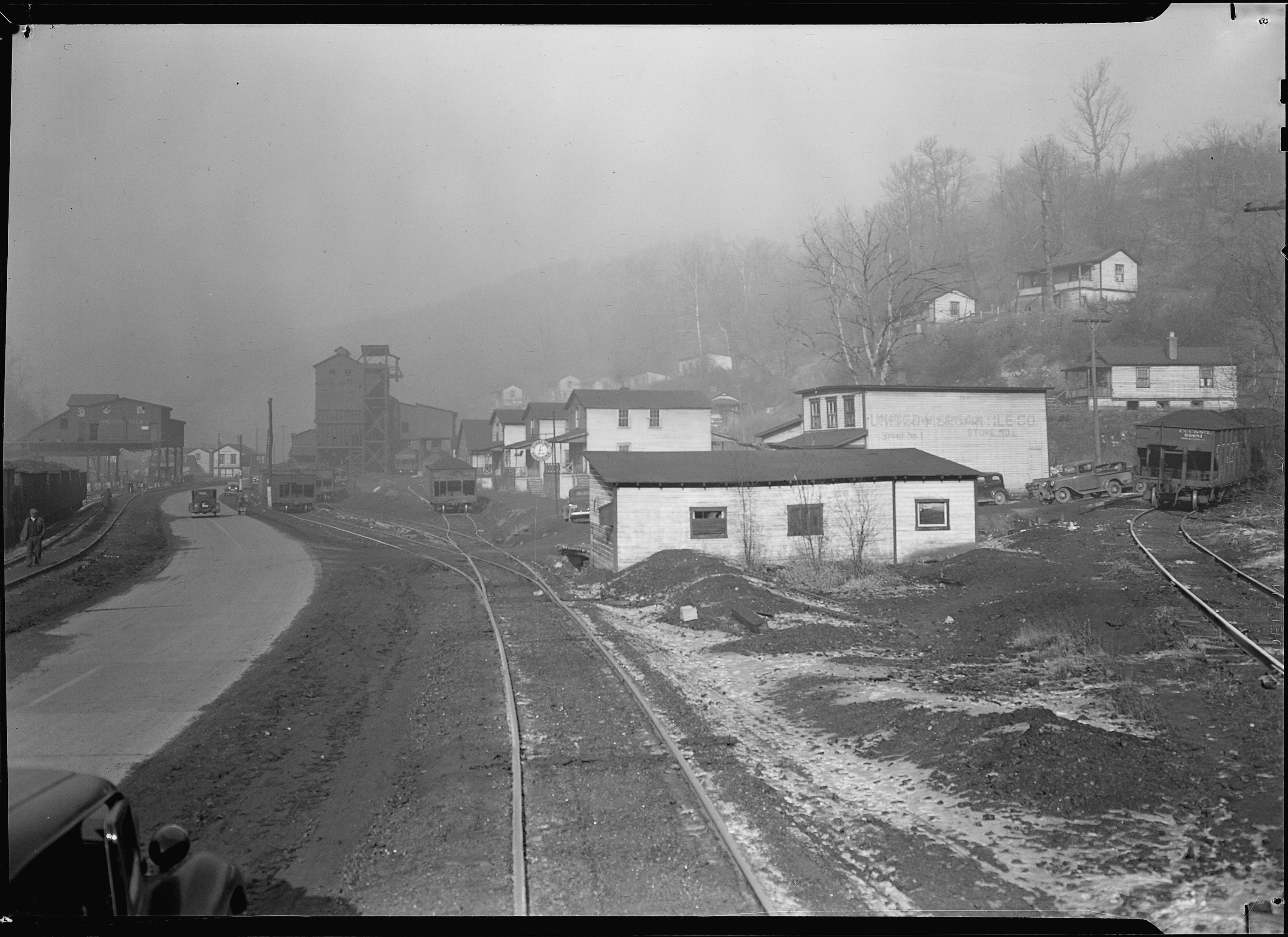
Pursglove Mines Nos. 3 and 4

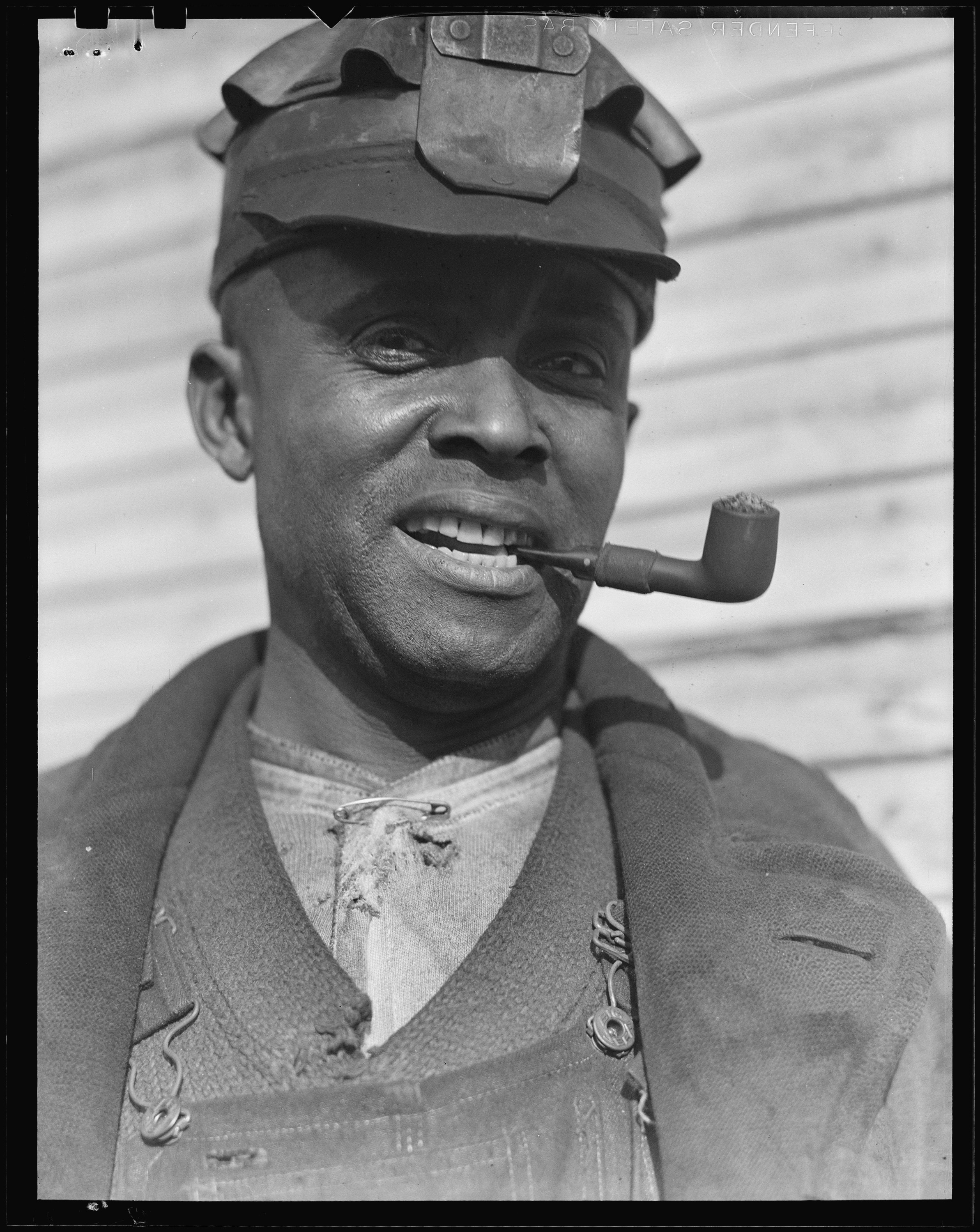
Unemployed miner

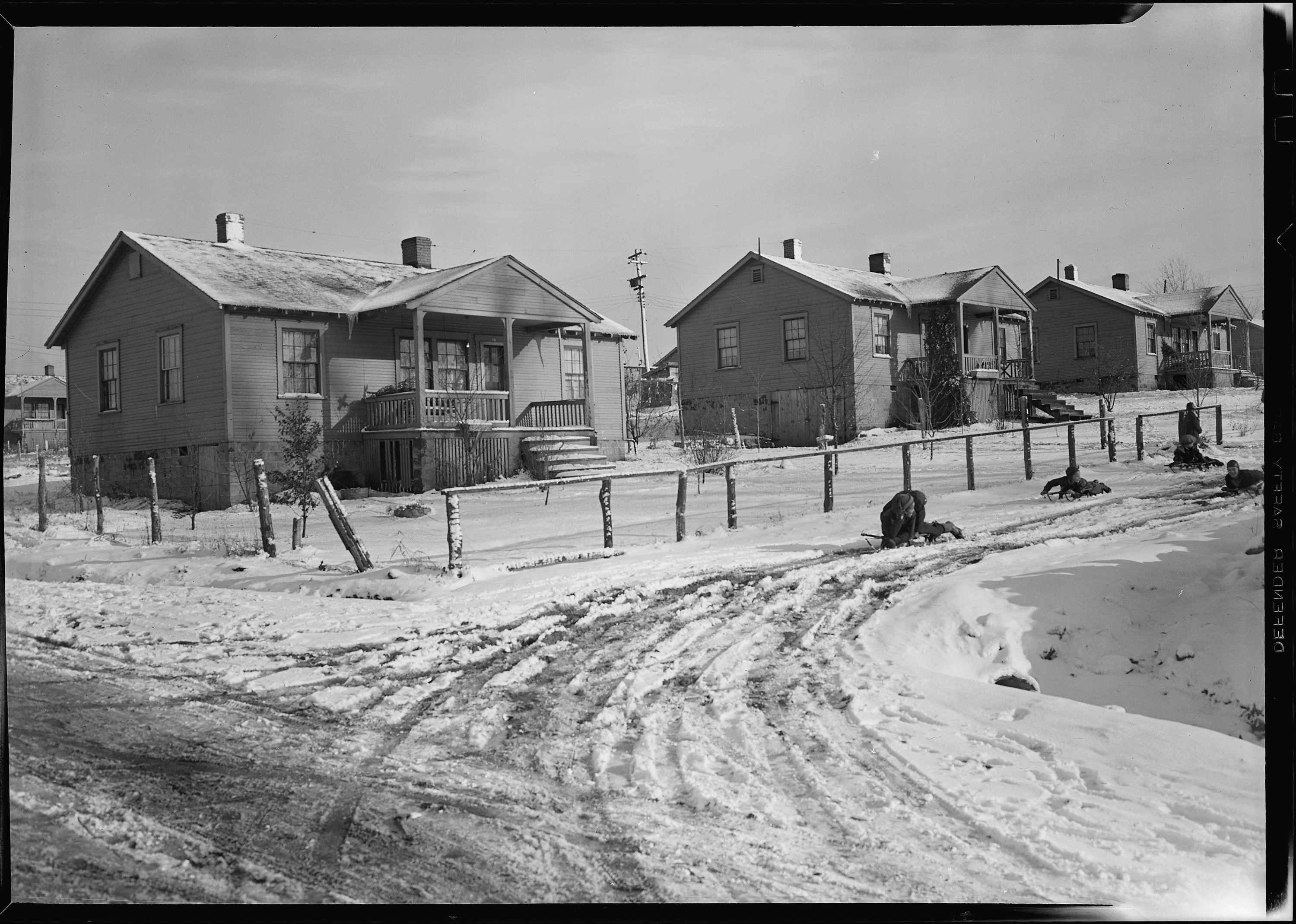
Miners' homes in the best community in Scotts Run

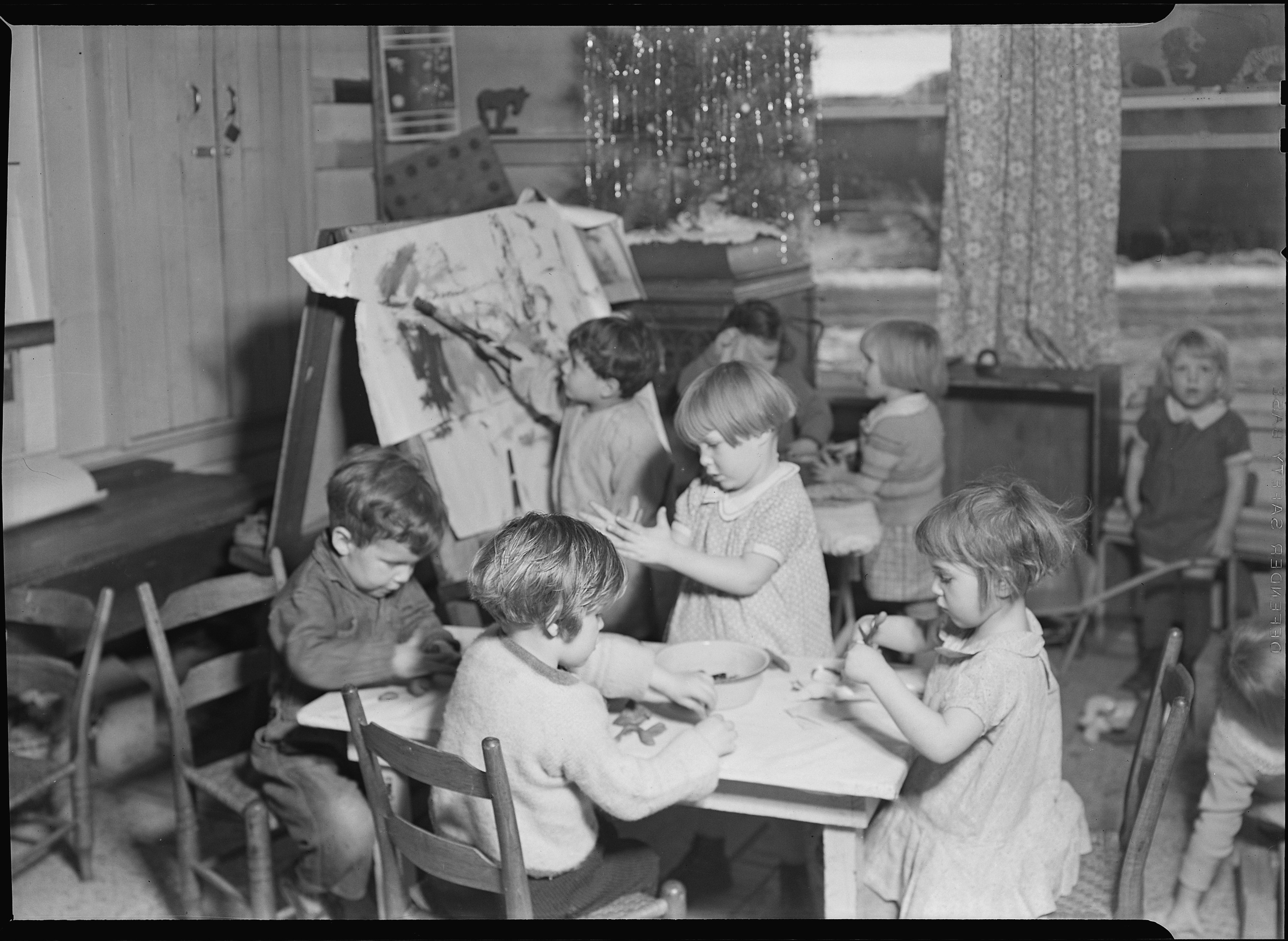
WPA nursery for children of unemployed miners

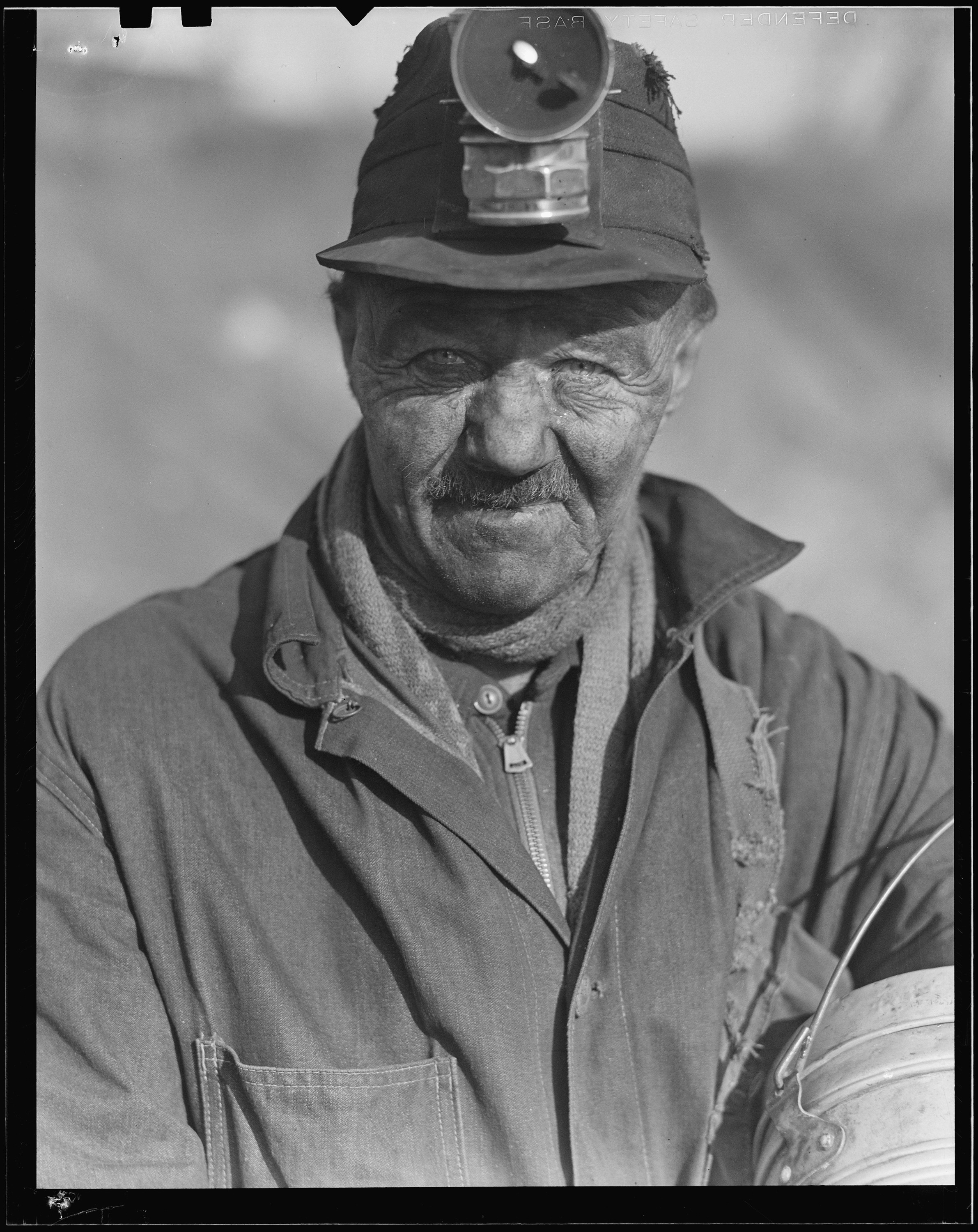
Unemployed miner

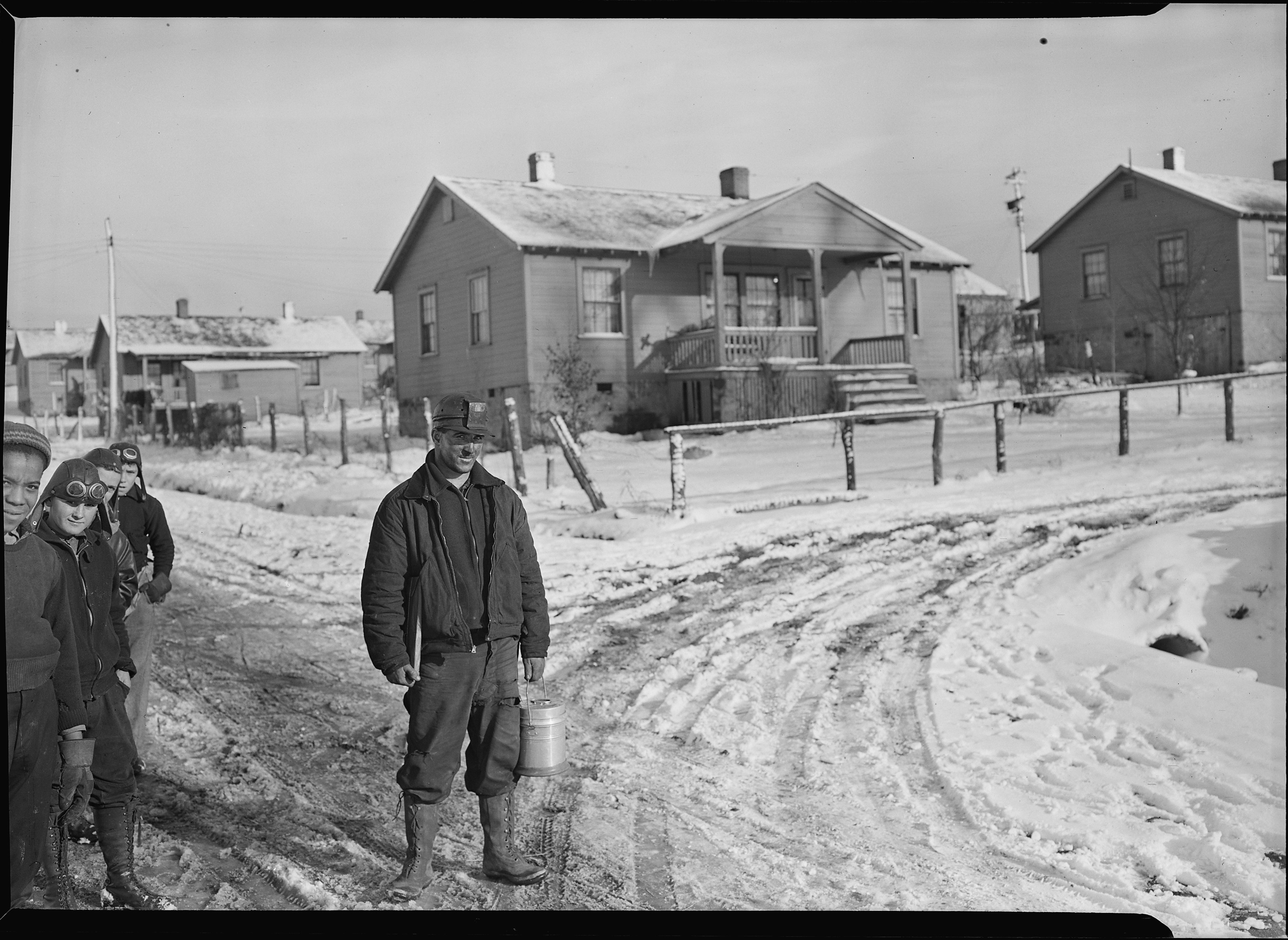
Miner returning from work

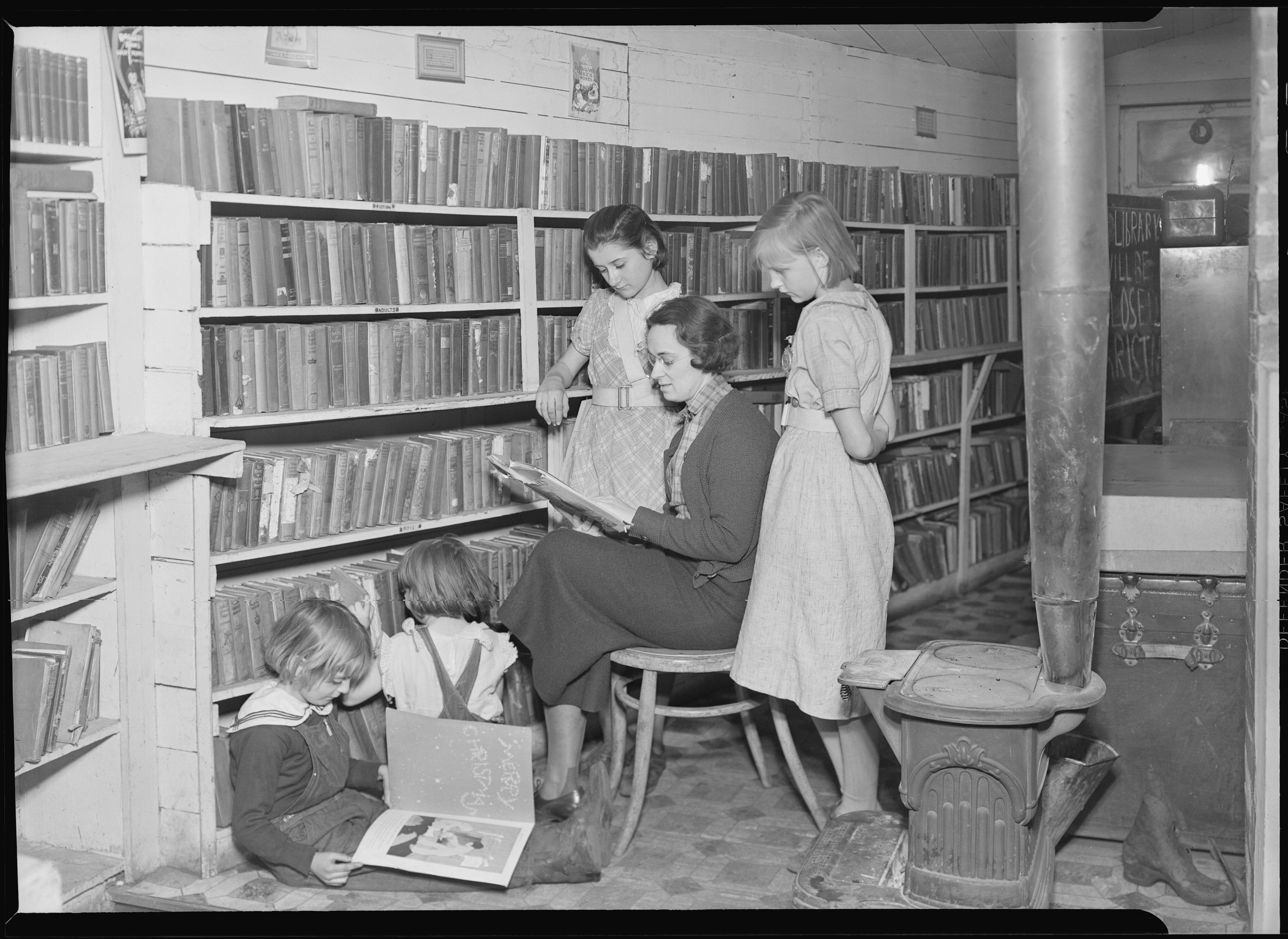
Library in Scotts Run

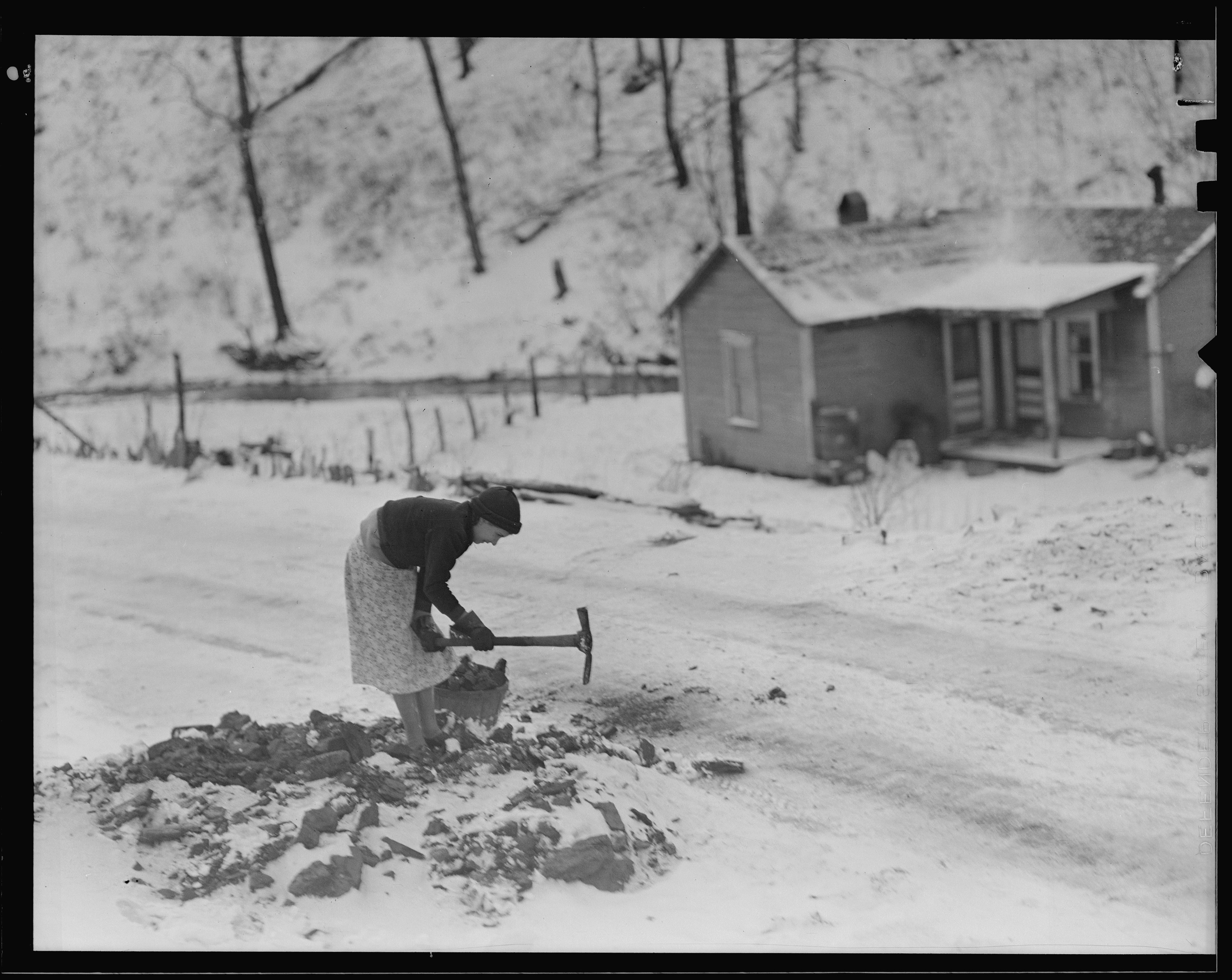
Woman gathering coal

== Mining disasters ==
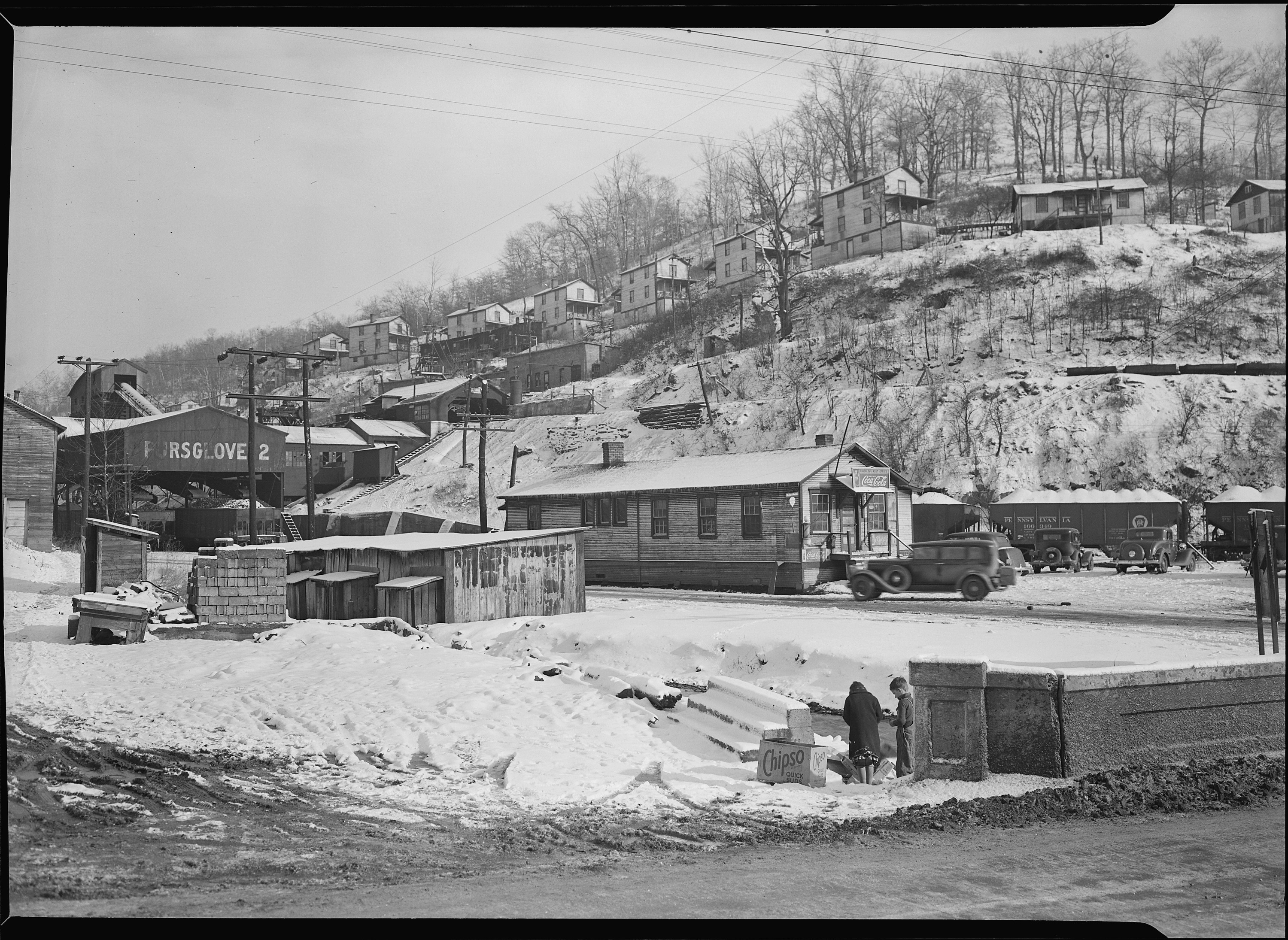
Pursglove No. 2 mine in 1937, showing company store and typical hillside

The 13 mining communities along Scotts Run had a reputation of being "disaster free" before World War II. The owners of the Christopher and Pursglove mines, in particular, were known as being highly safety conscious, and had even won awards for the safety of their mines. However, in 1942 and 1943, the dangers of mechanization, coupled with the added production pressures placed on the mines by the war effort, caused three mine disasters to occur along Scotts Run within nine months of each other.

On May 12, 1942, a locomotive cable short-circuited at the same time as a malfunction with one of the ventilation doors, and it caused a methane explosion and collapsing roofs. Fifty-six men total were killed in the blast.

On July 9, 1942, the nearby Pursglove No. 2 mine experienced an explosion when a roof fall caused a 550-volt trolley wire to fall onto the track and ignite the methane and coal dust filled air. The mine had used substandard rock dust to coat the mine's surface, which could have contributed to the intensity of the blast. Twenty were killed.

A third disaster occurred on January 8, 1943, when a haulage locomotive caught fire and 11 men sent to fight the blaze were suffocated by the smoke.

== Scotts Run today ==
Mine mechanization made a large labor force extraneous, and the population of Scotts Run has been in steady decline since the 1930s. New technologies also produced locomotives reliant on diesel engines lessened the demand for coal. By the 1950s, the mines left in the Run were consolidated into a few large parcels, mostly controlled by the Consolidation Coal Company. Finally, the construction of Interstate 79 bisected the Scotts Run area and eliminated remaining coal company housing.

Remnants of the mining industry remain scattered about the region, such as rusting mine tipples and acid mine drainage in the area streams and rivers.

Although the population is much smaller than during the coal boom, residents are actively attempting to preserve Scotts Run's history and bring new business to the area.
