= Tim Matthews (racing driver) =

Tim Matthews was born on 16 September 1953 and was a British racing driver and a racing instructor. He qualified at Bede College, Durham University as a teacher in 1974 and taught for three years at Nunnery Wood High School before taking up a career in motorsport. He has raced on both two and four wheels internationally.

Tim died on August 19, 2022

== Career ==
When Tim Matthews first gave up teaching in 1978 it was to pursue a career as a motocross rider and in the same year he successfully captained a three-man UK motocross team on tour in Zambia. After winning this series he returned again the following year to compete as an individual in the domestic Zambian Championship.

After running his own motocross shop for a year he worked closely with bike racers Mike Hailwood and Rodney Gould at their motorcycle shop in Birmingham. After the death of Hailwood in a car accident Matthews bought a piece of land next to the M5 at Worcester and opened his own motocross race track. In 1982 he launched the National Motocross Academy, a residential motocross school for budding motocross riders from around the world with pupils from as far a field as the USA and Thailand. As his reputation as an instructor spread he was asked to become the National Motocross Assessor for the Auto-Cycle Union qualifying a number of additional instructors. He continued to race taking UK teams of riders to the United Arab Emirates and Grand Canaria to compete.

In the late '80's he launched the UK Supercross Championship which was run under floodlights at his Motocross Track at Worcester. It rapidly became the leading UK supercross series with all the top riders in attendance and the series featured on BBC's Top Gear and filmed by Hay Fisher productions for showing as a complete series on Eurosport and Screensport. The championship ran very successfully for four years before the loss of part of the track to motorway widening brought its demise.

His off road motorcycle training clients included the police and armed forces and this led to his appointment as transport consultant for Save The Children Fund where he undertook a project teaching health workers how to use mopeds in Ghana. This led to further work for the World Health Organisation with similar projects in Uganda, Cameroon, Benin, and Niger and also a three-year project throughout Egypt for US Aid.

In 1994 after winning his final race he retired from motocross and sold his race track and a year later he took up car racing competing in The Alliance and Leicester Formula 2000 Championship. After racing in a variety of machinery over the next six years, during which time he had become an instructor, he raced for a season in the European Thoroughbred Grand Prix Championship driving a 1985 Tyrrell 012. During this year he wrote a television format to give the man in the street the opportunity to become a Formula 1 driver.

In 2003 the series was filmed for television by Diverse Productions and shown as a six-part series called 'Be a Grand Prix Driver'. Matthews worked as a judge alongside Tiff Needell and Jenson Button and his management team. The winning driver Mark Johnson raced at Monza in his first race finishing 1st in his class and on the top step of the podium. Subsequent series were run on Sky TV and Men and Motors with Matthews as the senior judge.

Throughout the first decade of this century Matthews has continued to race mostly in the UK Sports 2000 series with several class wins and numerous trophies. After undergoing major back surgery he has now become the senior instructor for SVG Promotions, a company offering a variety of motor racing driving experiences, their own race team and the manufacture of their own GT race car.
