= Prior Pursglove and Stockton Sixth Form College =

Sixth form college in Guisborough, North Yorkshire, England

Prior Pursglove College

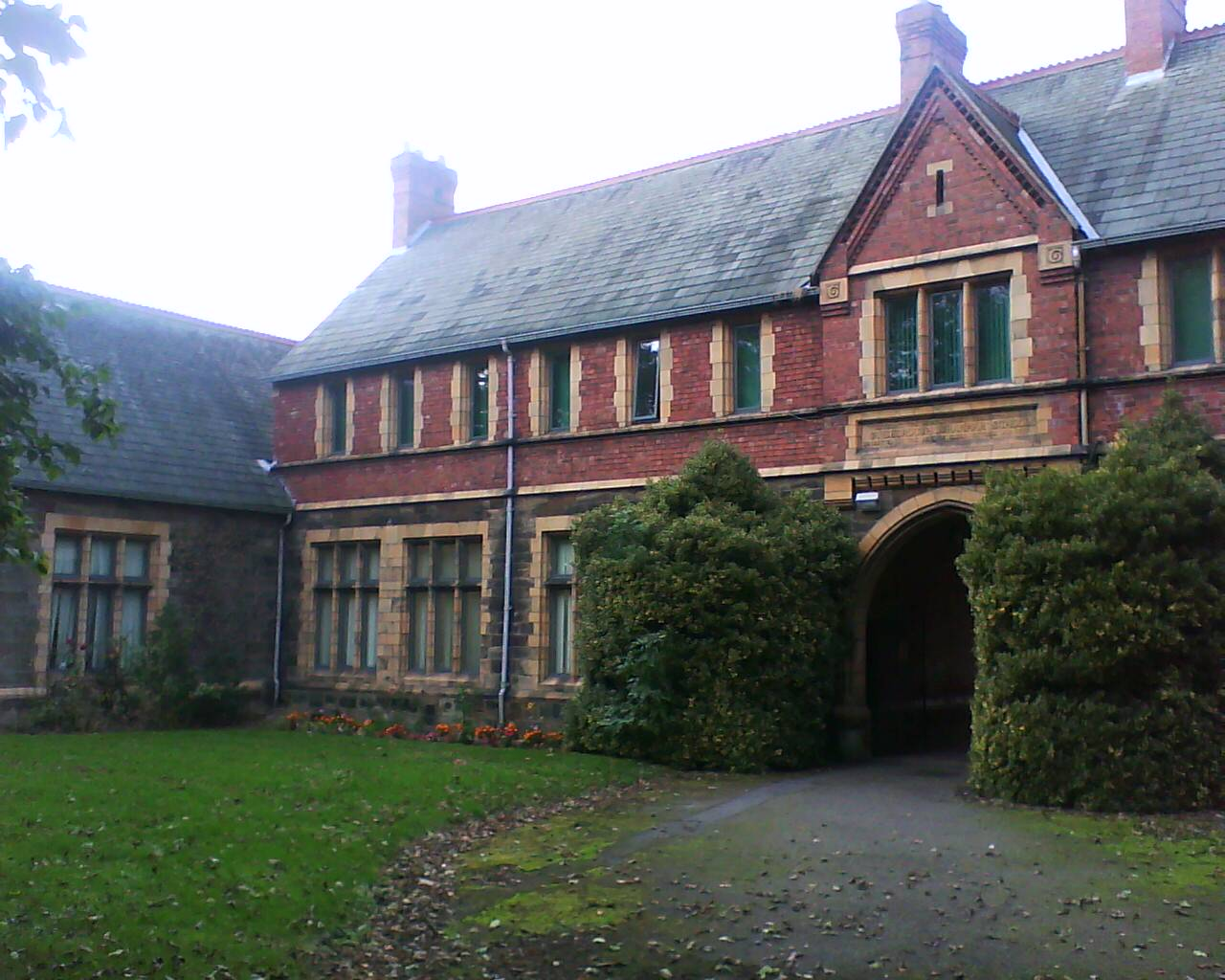
- The original 1887 Grammar School building, as it appeared in 2010

Location
- Church Walk; Guisborough, Redcar and Cleveland, TS14 6BU; England; 54°32′18″N 1°02′52″W

Information
- Type: Sixth Form College
- Motto: Expanding Opportunities, Enhancing Futures
- Established: 1971
- Local authority: Redcar and Cleveland Borough Council
- Ofsted: Reports
- Principal: Olivia Wytcherley
- Staff: 133
- Age: 16+
- Enrolment: 1600
- Website: www.pursglove.ac.uk

Stockton Sixth Form College

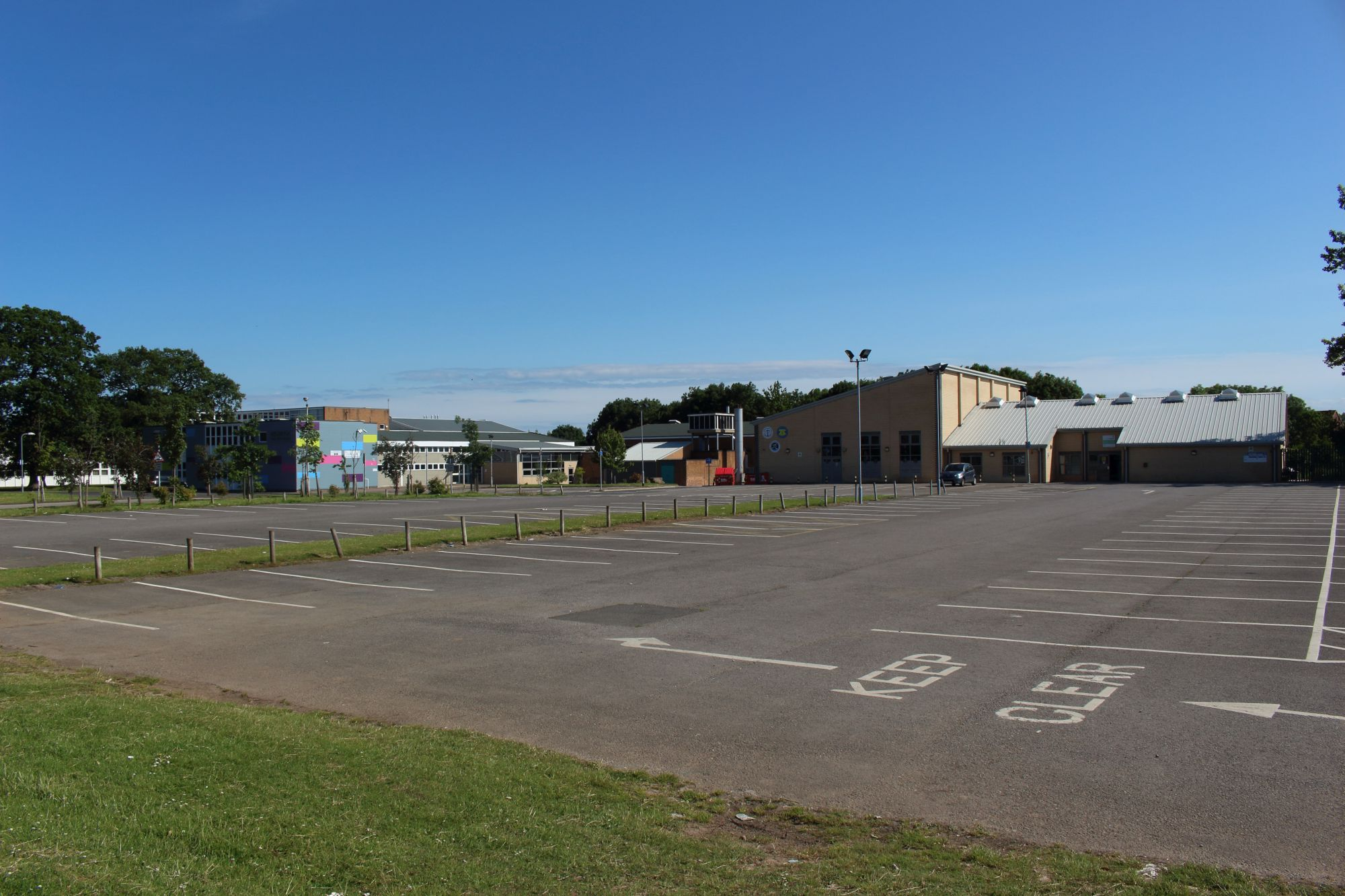

Location
- Bishopton Road West; Stockton-on-Tees, County Durham, TS19 0QD; England; 54°34′14″N 1°20′29″W

Information
- Type: Sixth Form College
- Motto: "Supporting Student Success"
- Established: 1973
- Local authority: Stockton-on-Tees Borough Council
- Department for Education URN: 130577 Tables
- Ofsted: Reports
- Principal: Michael Mackin
- Staff: about 80
- Age: 16+
- Enrolment: 1,000
- Website: www.stocktonsfc.ac.uk

Prior Pursglove and Stockton Sixth Form College is a sixth form college with sites in Guisborough and Stockton-on-Tees. The college is a result of a merger between Prior Pursglove College and Stockton Sixth Form College in May 2016. Prior Pursglove College is led by Olivia Wytcherley whilst Stockton Sixth Form College is led by Michael Mackin who is accountable to the board of governors.

The college educates around 1,600 students on the Guisborough campus, and 700 students on the Stockton campus.

== History ==
In 1561, Robert Pursglove set up a free school on the site which would later come to house Prior Pursglove College. The school existed to enable local boys to learn Latin and also served as an Almshouse for twelve local elderly residents. The school and almshouse was reformed in the 1880s to become Guisborough Grammar School, which became Prior Pursglove College in 1971. Prior Pursglove merged with South Park Sixth Form College in 1997, eventually consolidating the provision of education on to the Guisborough campus.

== Prior Pursglove College ==
=== Buildings ===
The oldest building on site was built by architect Alfred Waterhouse in 1887 for Guisborough Grammar School, and is Grade II listed. A tablet over the archway reads: "Founded in the reign of Queen Elizabeth AD 1561 Guisborough Grammar School re-erected in the reign of Queen Victoria AD 1887". The Waterhouse Building was refurbished in 2013 and now houses Foundation Learning provision. The Coverdale building is named after the creator of the English translated bible and houses humanity and language education.

Construction of a specialist arts & media building was completed in October 2012. The building was named after Guisborough-born Olympic gold medalist Willie Applegarth and was opened by his descendants and Jade Jones, a then-current Prior Pursglove College student who competed at the London Paralympics in 2012.

Other buildings include the Southpark Centre which houses the music, English and drama department and the Priory Centre which houses science, geography, geology, maths, ICT, business studies and psychology. The Priory Centre also contains a Resource Centre where students can spend private study time.

=== Educational provision ===
The college mainly specializes in full-time courses for the 16–19 age group, with a wide choice of Advanced level and intermediate courses.

Approximately 1,700 full-time students are enrolled at the college studying a range of courses including AS/A level, BTEC National Diploma and GCSEs.

The college also offers Foundation Learning courses, the Elite Project or Pathways Programme which are designed for 16- to 19-year-olds to help them get back into education, training or employment as well as a number of adult courses.

=== Students' Union ===
The college also has a students' union which is a member of the National Union of Students. The Union is led by a President and Vice President – elected by all students – and who also serve as student members of the Governing Body. The college has received two awards from the Learning and Skills Improvement Service relating to its student voice provision. In 2011, the college received a Leading the Learner Voice Award in 'Most improved Provider’, for progress in raising the profile of student voice within the college.

== Stockton Sixth Form College ==
Stockton Sixth Form College is the sixth form college in Stockton-on-Tees providing a range of A-level, BTEC and GCSE courses to 16–19 students in Stockton and the surrounding area.

The college was established in 1973 after a reorganisation of post-16 education in the Teesside area and is based on one site at Bishopton Road West, two miles from the town centre.

== Notable alumni ==
=== Prior Pursglove College ===
- Abi Alton – X Factor Contestant
- Sarah Borwell – Tennis Player
- Jonny Cocker – Racing Driver
- Brad Halliday – Professional Footballer
- Johanna Jackson – Commonwealth Champion Race Walker
- Rod Liddle – Journalist
- Katy Livingston – Modern Pentathlete
- Faye Marsay – Actress known for The White Queen (miniseries) and Game of Thrones
- Richard Milward – Author
- Luke Myer - MP for Middlesbrough South and East Cleveland and Deputy Secretary Of State For Energy Security and Net Zero
- Chris Tomlinson – Long Jumper
- David Sharp – Mountaineer whose death on Everest in 2006 sparked controversy
- Jade Jones – Paralympic athlete, wheelchair racing
- Cole Robinson – International documentary filmmaker
- Roger Evans, Baron Evans of Guisborough – Politician and life peer; former London Assembly Member for Havering and Redbridge.

=== Guisborough Grammar School ===
- Eric Garrett – Opera Singer (1931–2009)
- Robert Holman – Dramatist
- George King – Author and spiritual leader
- Dave Nellist – Politician
- Peter Prinsley – Politician, Labour MP for Bury St Edmunds and Stowmarket
- Keith Williams – former British Airways chairman and CEO

=== Stockton Sixth Form College ===
- Dave Robson – British Formula One engineer
- Bethany Bryan – Junior Team GB Athlete, Rowing
- Paul Smith – Musician, Maxïmo Park
- Callum Woodhouse – Actor known for The Durrells
- Allison Curbishley – BBC Five Live
