= Heath (surname) =

Heath is an English surname derived from the Old English word hǣþ, or heath. It referred to a person who lived on heathland. The name is also a given name.

It may refer to:

== Surname ==
- Adrian Heath (born 1961), English football player and manager
- Anne-Louise Heath, New Zealand nutritionist
- Anthony Heath (born 1942), British sociologist
- Benjamin Heath (1704–1766), British scholar
- Billy Heath (1869 – after 1895), English footballer
- Brandon Heath (born 1978), American musician
- Brandon Heath (basketball) (born 1984), American basketball player
- Charles Heath (1785–1848), English engraver
- Christopher Heath (disambiguation), multiple people
- Chris Heath, British writer
- Cuthbert Eden Heath (1859–1939), British insurer
- Darren Heath (born 1968), motor sports photographer
- Dave Heath (1931–2016), American documentary, humanist and street photographer
- David Heath (born 1954), British politician
- Deunte Heath (born 1985), American professional baseball player
- David Heath (wrestler) (born 1969), American professional wrestler
- Don Heath (born 1944), English football (soccer) player
- Earline Heath King (1913–2011), American sculptor
- Edward Heath (1916–2005), British politician; prime minister of the United Kingdom from 1970 to 1974
- Edward Heath (New Orleans) (1819–1892), mayor of New Orleans from 1867 to 1868
- Edward Bayard Heath (1888–1931), American aircraft engineer
- Elliott Heath (born 1989), American distance runner
- Eric Heath (disambiguation), multiple people
- Frederick Heath-Caldwell (born Heath, 1858–1945), British Army officer and RAF general
- Frank Gascoigne Heath (1873–1936), British painter
- Frank Lucien Heath (1857–1921) American painter
- Garrett Heath (born 1985), American distance runner
- George M. Heath, American scientist
- The Heath Brothers, American jazz musicians:
  - Albert Heath (1935–2024)
  - Jimmy Heath (1926–2020)
  - Percy Heath (1923–2005)
- Hollis Heath, American playwright and actress
- Iona Heath, English medical doctor
- Jeff Heath (1915–1975), Canadian baseball player
- James Heath (disambiguation), multiple people
- Joel Heath (born 1993), American football player
- John Heath (1922–1987), English entomologist
- John Heath-Stubbs (1918–2006), English poet and translator
- Joseph Heath (born 1967), Canadian philosopher
- Josiah Marshall Heath (died 1851), English ornithologist, metallurgist and businessman
- Josie Heath (born 1937), American politician, community activist, and educator
- Kenneth Heath (1919–1977), principal cellist with the London Symphony Orchestra
- Larry Heath, Australian entrepreneur and publisher, founder of the National Live Music Awards
- Lewis Heath (1885–1954), British general
- Liam Heath (born 1984), British sprint kayaker
- Lillian Heath (1865–1962), American doctor
- Lillian Dake Heath (Lillian Josephine Dake; 1864–1961) American painter, teacher
- Malik Heath (born 2000), American football player
- Lady Mary Heath (1896–1939), Irish aviator
- Mary Jo Heath (born 1954), American radio host\
- Matthew Heath (disambiguation), multiple people
- Michael Heath (disambiguation), multiple people
- Monroe Heath (1827–1894), American politician
- Neville Heath (1917–1946), British murderer
- Nicholas Heath (c. 1501–1578), archbishop of York and Lord Chancellor
- Nicholas Heath (director) (born 1959), British opera director
- Percy Heath, (1923–2005), American jazz musician
- Robert Heath (1575–1649), Attorney General of England, and founder of North Carolina
- Robert Galbraith Heath (1915–1999), psychiatrist who experimented on the brains of animals and patients
- Rodney Heath (1884–1936), Australian tennis player
- Rodney Heath (American football)
- Roy Heath (1926–2008), Guyanese writer
- Russ Heath (1926–2018), American artist
- Samantha Heath (born 1960), British politician
- Stan Heath (born 1964), American basketball coach
- Susannah Heath (1795–1878), American diarist
- T. L. Heath, Sir Thomas Little Heath (1861–1940), British mathematician and historian of classical Greek mathematics
- Ted Heath (bandleader) (1902–1969), British musician
- Tobin Heath (born 1988), American football (soccer) player
- Virginia Heath (born 1959), London-based New Zealand film director and academic
- Westby Heath (1891–1961), English footballer
- William Heath (1737–1814), American soldier and politician
- William Heath (artist) (1795–1840), British artist and caricaturist

== See also ==
- Heath (disambiguation)
