= List of people from Santa Cruz, California =

This is a list of notable people from Santa Cruz County, California. It includes people who were born/raised in, lived in, or spent portions of their lives in Santa Cruz, or for whom Santa Cruz is a significant part of their identity, as well as music groups founded in Santa Cruz. This list is in alphabetical order.

== Notable people from Santa Cruz, California ==
=== Academia ===
- Gerald M. Ackerman, art historian and professor
- Donna Haraway, feminist and professor
- David Haussler, computer scientist and professor
- David A. Huffman, computer scientist and professor
- Kevin Karplus, bioinformatician and professor

=== Activists ===
- Bettina Aptheker, political activist, radical feminist, professor and author
- Susie Bright, feminist writer, sexuality expert
- Rory Calhoun, actor
- Honey Lee Cottrell, lesbian and feminist activist, photographer and filmmaker, died in Santa Cruz
- Angela Davis, political activist, scholar, and writer
- Dorothy Granada, nurse, humanitarian, and peace and social justice activist who resided in Santa Cruz and who won the International Pfeffer Peace Award in 1997
- bell hooks, PhD from UCSC
- John Hoyt, actor
- Elissa Knight, actress
- Frank Lima (aka The Great Morgani), street performer, accordionist
- Camryn Manheim, actor

=== Actors and film production ===
- Remington Hoffman, actor
- ZaSu Pitts, actress
- Ruth Righi, actress, singer
- Adam Scott, actor
- Grant Show, actor
- Lex van den Berghe, Survivor contestant

=== Artists and designers ===
- Cam Archer, filmmaker and photographer
- Bathsheba Grossman, sculptor
- Frank Lucien Heath (1857–1921), painter
- Lillian Dake Heath (1864–1961), painter, watercolorist
- Scott Kurtz, cartoonist
- Frans Lanting, wildlife photographer
- Edmund McMillen, video game designer
- Ed Penniman, painter, graphic designer
- Suzanne Scheuer, artist, New Deal-era murals
- Gurdon Woods (1915–2007) sculptor, academic administrator

=== Crime ===
- Edmund Kemper, serial killer
- Herbert Mullin, serial killer

=== Entrepreneurs ===
- Elihu Anthony, alcalde, and blacksmith during the Gold Rush-era, and a founding father of the city of Santa Cruz
- John Battendieri, businessman, founder Santa Cruz Organic
- James H. Clark, entrepreneur and computer scientist
- Julia Hartz, co-founder and CEO of Eventbrite
- Reed Hastings, founder of Netflix
- Philippe Kahn, creator of the camera-phone, mathematician
- Jack O'Neill, credited with developing first surfing wet suits
- Lorenzo "Larry" Ponza, inventor of the modern baseball pitching machine
- Fred Swanton, creator of what is now the Santa Cruz Beach Boardwalk

=== Musicians ===
- Chet JR White, musician, producer and member of the band Girls
- Giovanni Amighetti, contemporary music composer (honorary citizen)
- Bob Brozman, guitarist and ethnomusicologist
- Cornelius Bumpus, saxophonist for bands Doobie Brothers and Steely Dan
- David Cope, composer
- Decrepit Birth, death metal band
- Sasha Dobson, jazz singer
- James Durbin, singer and guitarist; American Idol finalist
- Entheos, technical death metal band
- Remy and Pascal Le Boeuf, twin jazz musicians
- Tom Lehrer, musician and satirist
- Bob Lowery, blues singer and guitarist
- David Lowery, guitarist, Camper Van Beethoven and Cracker
- Chris Rene, musician, singer-songwriter
- Derek Sherinian, keyboardist for Alice Cooper, the band Kiss, and the band Dream Theater
- Skip Spence, musician, singer-songwriter; co-founder of Moby Grape
- Ted Templeman, drummer for Harpers Bizarre
- Them Are Us Too, music duo which formed while both members (Cash Askew and Kennedy Ashlyn Wenning) were students at UC Santa Cruz
- Gertrude Auld Thomas, opera singer and composer
- Oliver Tree, musician, songwriter, director, and internet personality
- Lu Watters, jazz trumpeter, founder of Yerba Buena Jazz Band
- Scott Weiland, vocalist for bands Stone Temple Pilots and Velvet Revolver
- Joy Williams, musician
- Windser, musician
- George Winston, pianist

=== Bands ===
- Arsonists Get All The Girls (experimental deathcore)
- Bassnectar (electronic/dubstep)
- Blackbird Raum (acoustic punk)
- Bl'ast (punk)
- Brain Drill (technical death metal)
- The Call (rock)
- Camper Van Beethoven (alternative)
- The Chop Tops (rockabilly)
- Comets on Fire (psychedelic/noise/rock)
- Craig's Brother (punk)
- Decrepit Birth (death metal)
- Deth Specula (first live music concert broadcast over the Internet)
- The Devil Makes Three (folk/punk)
- Dirty Penny (Hard Rock/Glam Metal)
- The Ducks (rock)
- Estradasphere (experimental)
- The Expendables (reggae)
- Good Riddance (punk)
- Harpers Bizarre (pop)
- The Holy Sisters of the Gaga Dada (pop rock)
- Minnesota (dubstep/EDM)
- Nuclear Whales Saxophone Orchestra
- Slow Gherkin (ska/punk)
- Sound Tribe Sector 9 (electronic/psychedelic rock)
- Spot 1019 (country blues punk rock)
- Swingin' Utters (punk)
- World Entertainment War (tribal funk)

=== Writers and poets ===
- Ralph Abraham, mathematician
- Bettina Aptheker, feminist and author
- Ellen Bass, poet
- Peter S. Beagle, novelist
- Jennifer Otter Bickerdike, music writer and lecturer
- Rob Brezsny, astrologer, poet, writer, and musician
- Norman O. Brown, scholar, writer, and social philosopher
- Jonathan Franzen, novelist and essayist
- Laurie Garrett, science journalist and author, UCSC graduate
- Steven Hassan, author, mental health expert and cult exit counselor
- Robert A. Heinlein, author of science fiction
- Dennis Holt, poet, linguist, and translator
- James D. Houston, novelist
- Jeanne Wakatsuki Houston, novelist
- Laurie R. King, novelist
- Noah Levine, author and Buddhist teacher
- Morton Marcus, poet, teacher
- Lia Matera, mystery writer
- Josephine Clifford McCracken, writer
- James Alan McPherson, essayist
- Liza Monroy, novelist, memoirist, essayist, and educator
- Adrienne Rich, poet, writer, feminist
- William James Royce, playwright/director, screenwriter, and novelist
- Robert Sward, poet
- Arthur A. Taylor (1849–1923) writer, Santa Cruz Surf newspaper publisher and editor
- Robert Anton Wilson, author, novelist, essayist, editor, playwright, poet, futurist, and self-described agnostic mystic

=== Scientists ===
- James P. Crutchfield, physicist at UCSC
- Frank Drake, astrophysicist
- Sandra M. Faber, astrophysicist
- J. Doyne Farmer, physicist at UCSC
- Alison Galloway, forensic anthropologist
- Jim Kent, bioinformatician
- Michael Nauenberg, physicist
- Jerry Nelson, astronomer
- Norman Packard, physicist at UCSC
- Robert Shaw, physicist at UCSC
- Ted Taylor, theoretical physicist with a focus on nuclear energy; disarmament advocate

=== Sports ===
- Brendon Ayanbadejo, National Football League player and activist
- Obafemi Ayanbadejo, NFL player and older brother of Brendon
- Trent Dilfer, National Football League player, ESPN sportscaster
- Nate Doss, professional disc golfer and three-time PDGA World Champion
- Lynden Gooch, soccer player who represented the United States national team
- Glenallen Hill, Major League Baseball player
- Johnny Johnson, NFL player
- Haley Jones, WNBA player
- Ernie Lombardi, Major League Baseball player
- Walmer Martinez, USL player
- Casey McGehee, Major League Baseball player
- Jay Moriarity, surfer
- Stephen Quadros, MMA play-by-play broadcaster
- Luke Rockhold, mixed martial artist, former Strikeforce and UFC middleweight champion
- Chris Sharma, rock climber
- Reggie Stephens, professional football player for the New York Giants
- Ken Westerfield, disc sports (Frisbee) pioneer, competitor, promoter

=== Other ===
- Matt Mahurin, film director and photographer
- Robert Hale Merriman, commander of the Lincoln Battalion during the Spanish Civil War
- Marisa Miller, Sports Illustrated and Victoria's Secret model
- Nikki Silva, Peabody Award-winning radio producer
- W. D. Storey (1830–1914), English-born American judge, lawyer, and district attorney
- Lorette Wood, first female city councilwoman and first female mayor of Santa Cruz

== Attended University of California, Santa Cruz ==
- Richard Bandler, author
- Jello Biafra, vocalist for the Dead Kennedys
- Ken Corday, music composer
- Adragon De Mello, child prodigy
- Cary Fukunaga, Emmy Award-winning film director
- Gus Hansen, professional poker player
- Victor Davis Hanson, historian
- Miranda July, filmmaker, author, performance artist
- Ethan Klein, comedian and podcast host
- David Lowery, vocalist for Camper Van Beethoven and Cracker
- Camryn Manheim, actor
- Kent Nagano, conductor
- Huey P. Newton, activist and leader of the Black Panthers
- Bradley Nowell, lead singer and guitarist for Sublime
- Marti Noxon, television and film writer
- Norman Packard, chaos theory physicist
- Joe Palca, National Public Radio science reporter
- Dana Priest, Pulitzer Prize-winning journalist
- Jason Roberts, Pulitzer Prize-winning author
- Rebecca Romijn, model and actor
- Maya Rudolph, actor
- Andy Samberg, writer and comedian
- Akiva Schaffer, Emmy Award-winning comedy writer
- Brenda Shaughnessy, poet
- Kathryn Dwyer Sullivan, astronaut
- Amy Tan, author
- Jesse Thorn, radio personality
- Rubén Valtierra, keyboardist for Weird Al Yankovic, producer, composer
- Ally Walker, actor
- Gillian Welch, musician
- Rich Wilkes, director and screenwriter
- Susan Wojcicki, CEO of YouTube
- Ron Yerxa, film producer

== See also ==
- List of people from Oakland, California
- List of people from San Francisco
- List of people from San Jose, California
- List of people from Palo Alto, California
