= William Heath (disambiguation) =

William Heath was a soldier, farmer and politician.

William Heath may also refer to:

- William Heath (artist) (1795–1840), British artist
- William Womack Heath (1903–1971), American lawyer, educator, and diplomat
- William Heath (died 1570), member of parliament for Ripon and Ludlow
- William Heath (died 1607), member of parliament for Bath
- William Heath (Jamaican politician), elected to the House of Assembly of Jamaica in 1820

== See also ==
- Bill Heath (disambiguation)
- Heath (surname)
