= Christopher Heath =

Christopher Heath may refer to:

- Christopher Heath (minister) (1802–1876), minister in the Catholic Apostolic Church
- Christopher Heath (surgeon) (1835–1905), son of the above, surgeon
