= George Heath =

George Heath may refer to:

- George Heath (priest) (1745–1822), headmaster of Eton School
- George Heath (racing driver) (1862–1943), American racing driver
- George M. Heath, American scientist who developed a tuberculosis serum in 1913
- George Heath (cricketer) (1913–1994), English cricketer
- George Heath (cinematographer), Australian cinematographer
- George Poynter Heath, Royal Navy captain and portmaster of Queensland, Australia
- Ted Heath (bandleader) (George Edward Heath, 1902–1969), musician and big band leader
