= William Storey =

William Storey may refer to:

- W. A. Storey (William A. Storey; 1854–1917), mayor of Portland, Oregon, U.S. 1899–1900
- William Benson Storey (1857–1940), president of the Atchison, Topeka and Santa Fe Railway, United States
- William John Storey, British businessman
- W. D. Storey (William Dalphin Storey; 1830–1914), English-born American judge, lawyer, and district attorney

== See also ==
- William Story (disambiguation)
