= Benjamin Stark =

American politician (1820–1898)

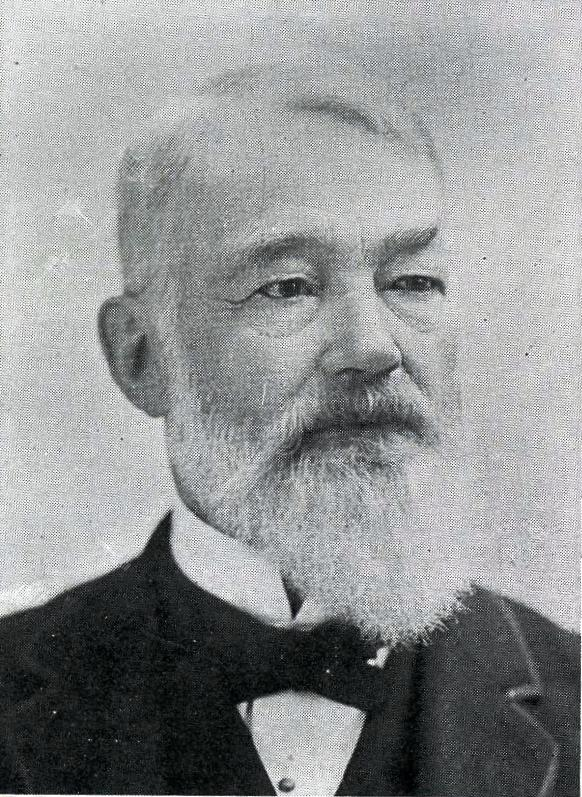

United States Senator from Oregon
- In office October 29, 1861 – September 12, 1862
- Appointed by: John Whiteaker
- Preceded by: Edward Dickinson Baker
- Succeeded by: Benjamin F. Harding

Personal details
- Born: June 26, 1820 New Orleans, Louisiana, U.S.
- Died: October 10, 1898 (aged 78) New London, Connecticut, U.S.
- Party: Democratic
- Spouse: Elizabeth Molthrop
- Profession: Attorney; merchant

Benjamin Stark (June 26, 1820 – October 10, 1898) was an American merchant and politician in Oregon. A native of Louisiana, he purchased some of the original tracts of land for the city of Portland. He later served in the Oregon House of Representatives before appointment to the United States Senate in 1860 after the death of Edward D. Baker. A Democrat, Stark served in the Senate from 1861 to 1862. He later served in the Connecticut House of Representatives.

== Early life ==
Stark was born in New Orleans, Louisiana, on June 26, 1820. His family moved to Connecticut where he graduated from Union School in New London after studying the classics. Stark then graduated from the Hebron Academy in Maine. From 1835 to 1845 he engaged in mercantile pursuits in New York City and read law.

== Oregon ==
In 1845, he sailed to what became Portland, Oregon, as the supercargo (cargo supervisor) of the Toulon, bringing goods for Francis Pettygrove's warehouse.

In 1846, he purchased half of Asa Lovejoy's 640 acres (2.6 km^{2}) making up the original claim to the future city for $390 (~$12,482 in 2025) in cash. Stark bought the land for speculation rather than as a home or commercial property, and so he continued sailing as a merchant and visited the claim only occasionally. Despite often being absent on business, Stark was a civic leader in early Portland. For example, he led the city Freemasons, membership in which was a status symbol at the time.

In 1848, he sailed to San Francisco to take part in the California Gold Rush and was a merchant there from 1849 to 1850. Around the time Stark left San Francisco in 1850 to set up shop in Portland, he discovered his claim was disputed.

At a meeting in San Francisco with Daniel H. Lownsdale, Stark reached a settlement with the other stakeholders which gave Stark sole title to a triangular section in what is now downtown Portland between the Willamette River, Stark Street, and Ankeny Street. In return for giving up the rest of the claim, Lownsdale, Coffin, and Chapman paid Stark for land they had already sold on his acreage, which was roughly 48 acres (190,000 m^{2}) and included most of what was then downtown. Later, another dispute between the parties arose after Stark refused to part with two narrow blocks needed to connect the park blocks.

== Political career ==
He was admitted to the bar that same year and in 1852 became a member of the Oregon Territory's House of Representatives. In the legislature he was a Whig representing Washington County, which at that time included Portland. Stark was a colonel and served in the 1853 hostilities between settlers and Native Americans during the Rogue River Wars. He married Elizabeth Molthrop.

Stark served on the Portland Public Schools board from 1852 to 1854.

In 1860, Stark was again elected to the Oregon House of Representatives, now representing Multnomah County after its creation in 1854, and now as a Democrat. Oregon's junior Senator, Edward Dickinson Baker, was killed in action during the American Civil War in October 1861. Oregon Governor John Whiteaker appointed Stark to replace Baker in the United States Senate and served from October 29, 1861, to September 12, 1862. He was an advocate for slavery and originally opposed the creation of publicly financed primary schools. He did not run in the election for a permanent replacement and was succeeded by Benjamin F. Harding, who had been Speaker of the Oregon House during Stark's time there in 1860.

== Later years and legacy ==
In 1864, he was a delegate to the Democratic National Convention held in Chicago. He accumulated a fortune selling plots of his land in what became Downtown Portland. After Congress, Stark resumed his practice of law, before returning east to New London. There he became a member of the board of aldermen of the city, serving from 1873 to 1874 when he was elected to the Connecticut House of Representatives. He also was a member of the Connecticut State Prison Commission. Benjamin Stark died in New London, Connecticut, on October 10, 1898, at the age of 78 and was interred in Cedar Grove Cemetery.

The Clyde Hotel was renamed Ben Stark Hotel in 1987, but became the Ace Hotel in 2005. The east–west running Stark Street in Portland is named in his honor. In late 2017, activists proposed renaming Southwest Stark Street for gay rights activist Harvey Milk, noting that Stark was an unapologetic racist who advocated for slavery. The Portland City Council accepted the recommendation.

U.S. Senate
Preceded by Edward D. Baker	U.S. senator (Class 2) from Oregon; October 29, 1861 – September 12, 1862; Served alongside: James W. Nesmith	Succeeded by Benjamin F. Harding
