= William Story =

William Story may refer to:

- William Wetmore Story (1819–1895), American artist and art critic
- William Edward Story (1850–1930), American mathematician
- William Story (Australian politician) (1857–1924), member of the Australian Senate and the Australian House of Representatives
- William Story (attorney) (1843–1921), Arkansas judge and later Colorado politician
- William Story (cricketer) (1852–1939), British Army officer and English cricketer

== See also ==
- William Storey (disambiguation)
