= Evergreen Cemetery (Santa Cruz, California) =

Cemetery in Santa Cruz, California

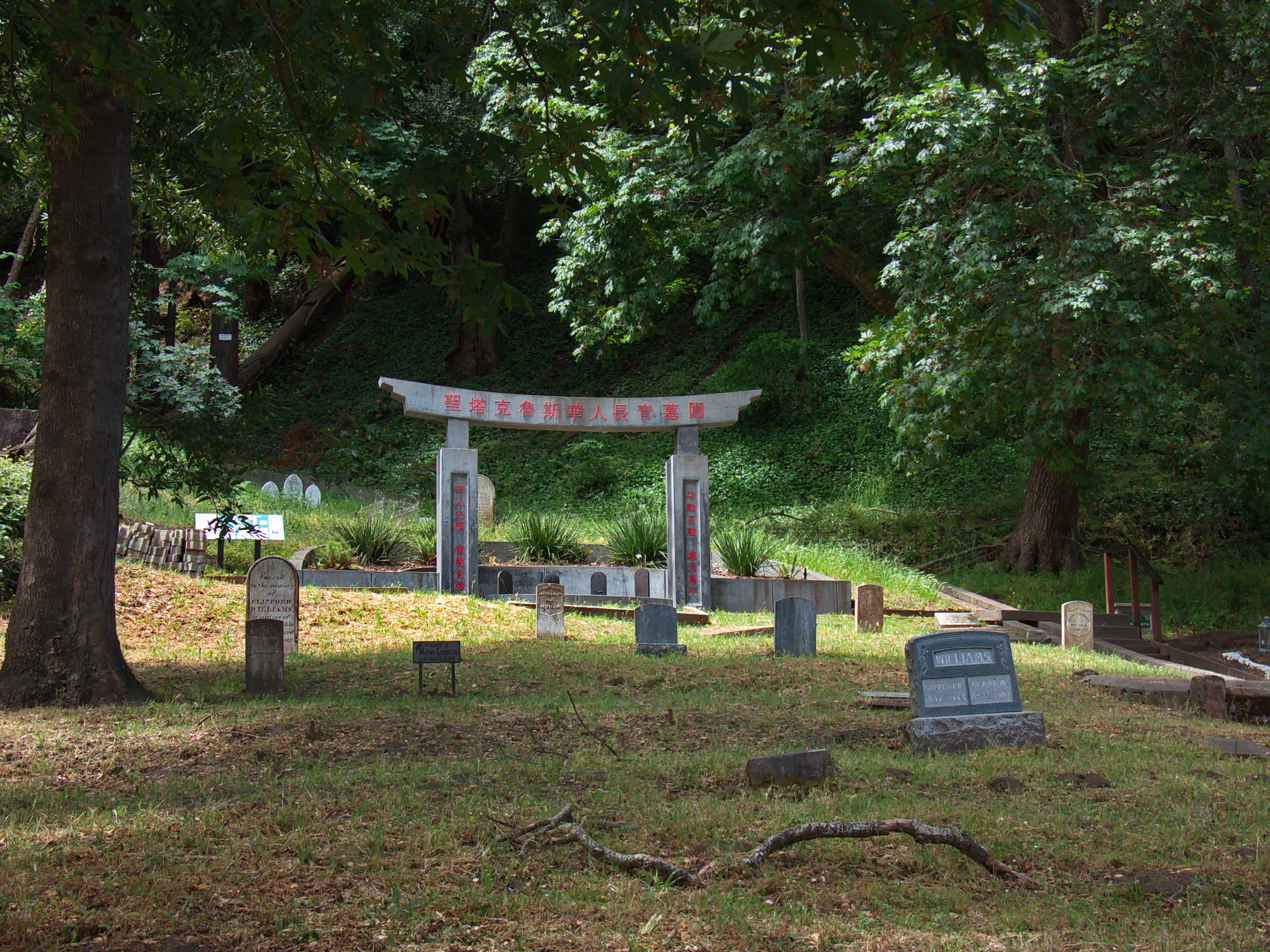
- Interactive map of Evergreen Cemetery

Details
- Established: c.1850
- Location: Santa Cruz, California
- Country: United States
- Coordinates: 36°58′51″N 122°02′08″W
- Type: Public
- Find a Grave: Evergreen Cemetery

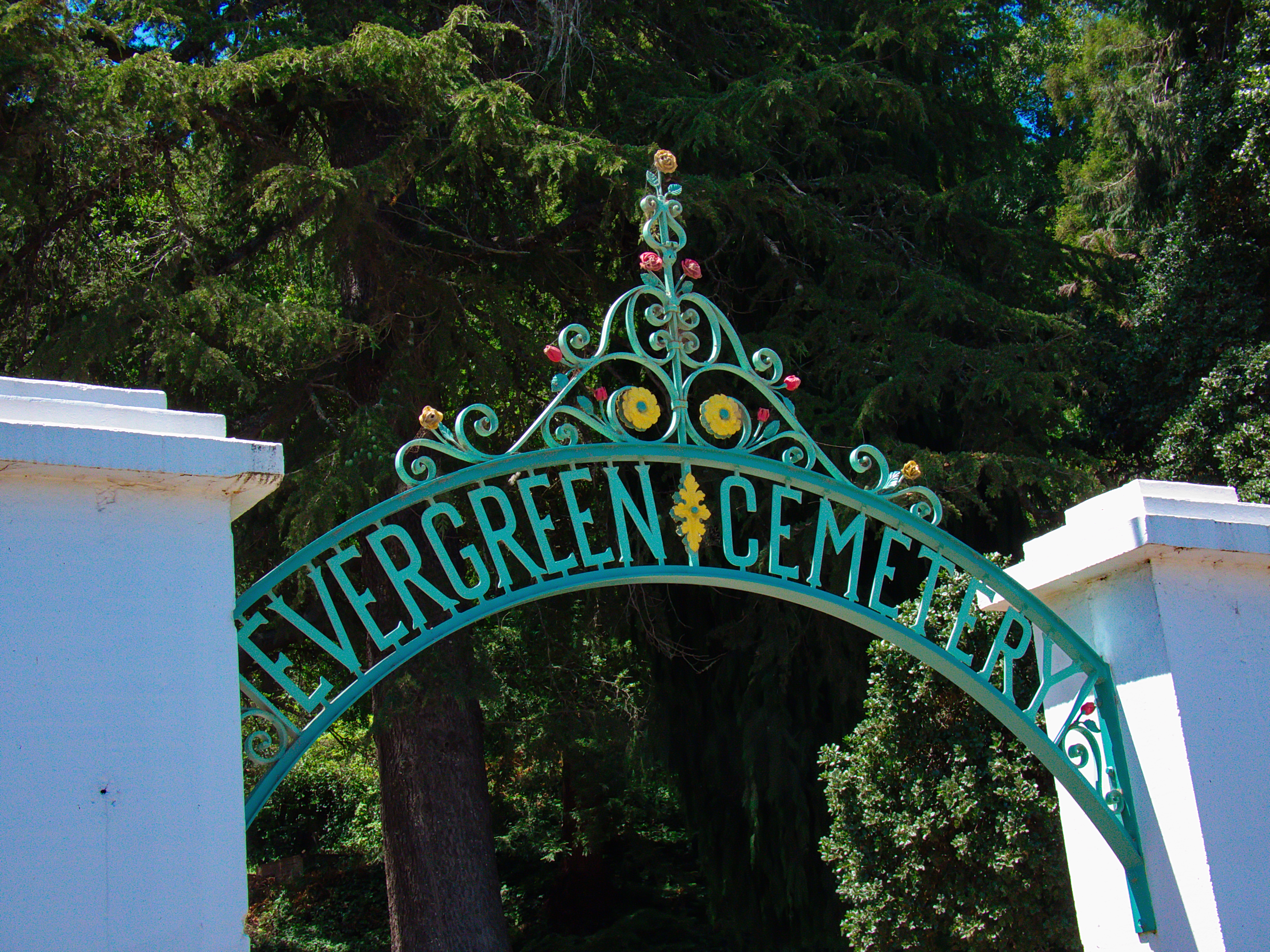
Evergreen Cemetery gate in Santa Cruz

Evergreen Cemetery is a historic public cemetery located on Evergreen Street in Santa Cruz, California and was established in the 1850s. Since 2008, the Evergreen Cemetery is under the management of the Santa Cruz Museum of Art and History (MAH).

== About ==
The Evergreen Cemetery is built on 8 acres of land, and features wrought iron fences around some family grave sites. It is located near Harvey West Park.

The cemetery is divided into five sections including the Grand Army of the Republic; the Freemasons; the main section; the "evergreen extension" added in the 1940s; and the Chinese section (due to the anti-Chinese sentiment, which led to the Chinese Exclusion Act of 1882). The Chinese section of the cemetery allowed for traditional Chinese funerals featuring firecrackers, processions and a Chinese oven-onsite for food served. The Santa Cruz Museum of Art and History oversaw the construction of a Chinese gate in 2014, to honor those buried. The Grand Army of the Republic section, was created by a fraternal organization of the American Civil War veterans honoring those who fought to end slavery and supported the Union.

This cemetery is said to be haunted.

== History ==
The land for Evergreen Cemetery was a gift from the Imus family. An early burial at this cemetery was a baby named Julia Arcan, who died in Death Valley in 1850. Some say the first burial was in 1858, when Harry Speel fell off a cliff at what is now called Cowell Beach.

In 1955, there was a Christmas flood and it left the cemetery in poor shape, and over time the cemetery was overgrown with plants and toppled gravestones. In 1973, Renie Leaman led an effort to restore the cemetery.

== Notable burials ==
- Isaac Graham (1800–1863), fur trader, mountain man, and land grantee
- Frank Lucien Heath (1857–1921), painter, and teacher
- Lillian Dake Heath (1864–1961), painter, and teacher
- Lucien Heath (1819–1888), farmer, merchant, and politician from Oregon
- Hiram A. Imus Jr. (1804–1875), politician, member of the California State Assembly
- Oliver Tree Nickell (1993–2026), singer-songwriter, rapper, record producer, comedian, and filmmaker
- W. D. Storey (1830–1914), English-born American judge, lawyer, and district attorney
- Arthur A. Taylor (1849–1923) newspaper publisher and editor, published the Santa Cruz Surf newspaper

== See also ==
- List of cemeteries in California
- Pioneer cemetery
