= Lucien Heath =

American politician (1819–1888)

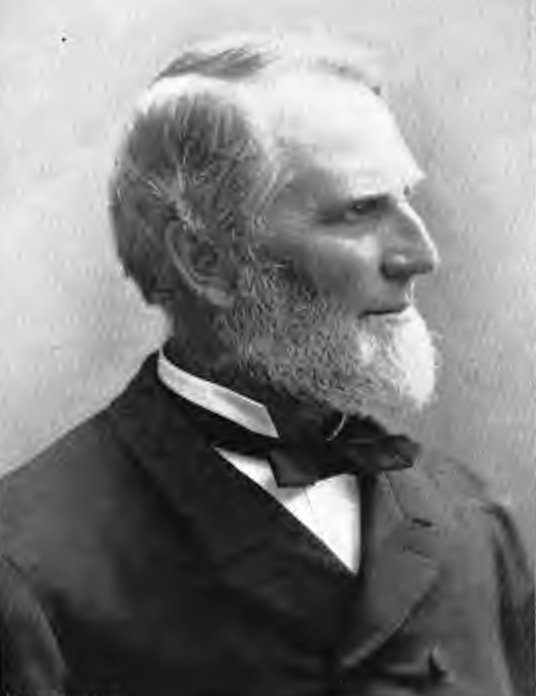

Member of the California State Assembly from the 50th district
- In office January 5, 1885 – January 3, 1887
- Preceded by: District established
- Succeeded by: Jesse Cope

Member of the California State Assembly from the Santa Cruz district
- In office January 8, 1883 – January 5, 1885

Mayor of Salem, Oregon
- In office 1861
- Preceded by: Wiley Kenyon
- Succeeded by: E. N. Cooke

Secretary of State of Oregon
- In office March 3, 1859 – September 8, 1862
- Governor: John Whiteaker
- Preceded by: Benjamin F. Harding (territorial)
- Succeeded by: Samuel E. May

Personal details
- Born: May 10, 1819 near Buffalo, New York, U.S.
- Died: December 19, 1888 (aged 69)
- Party: Democratic; Republican
- Spouse: Jane Edwards
- Relations: Lillian Dake Heath (daughter-in-law)
- Children: 2, including Frank Lucien Heath
- Occupation: Farmer, merchant, banker, politician

Lucien Heath (May 10, 1819 – December 19, 1888) was an American farmer, merchant, and politician in Oregon. A native of New York, he was raised there and in Michigan before immigrating to the Oregon Territory. A Democrat, he served as the first Oregon Secretary of State after Oregon entered the Union in 1859, and was also the mayor of Salem. After moving to Santa Cruz County, California, he was elected to the California Assembly for two terms as a Republican.

== Early life ==
Lucien Heath was born on May 10, 1819, in the state of New York near Buffalo to a merchant father. The family moved to Michigan when Heath was young where he farmed. In 1849, he married there to Jane Edwards of Ohio, and they had two sons and a daughter. In 1852, the family of Jane, Lucien, and son Henry (the daughter Lina had already died), moved to the Oregon Territory over the Oregon Trail.

== Career ==
Heath and the family settled in Polk County in the Willamette Valley where he started a farm. In 1854, he was appointed as the clerk of the territorial court. He later became a trustee of the La Creole Academy that was started in 1856 in Dallas. Heath then served as clerk of Polk County. After Heath moved to Salem he became a merchant. He also served as the recording secretary for the State Agricultural Society in Marion County where Salem is located. In this position, Heath became the first financial secretary of the Oregon State Fair, held at Oregon City.

In 1858, he was elected as a Democrat to serve as Secretary of State once Oregon was admitted to the Union. Oregon became a state on February 14, 1859, with the news of acceptance arriving in Oregon weeks later. Heath took office on March 3, 1859, replacing outgoing territorial secretary Benjamin F. Harding. He moved to Salem and served in office until leaving on September 8, 1862. He also was mayor of Salem, the state capitol, in 1861. He then served as the clerk to the Oregon Supreme Court from 1862 to 1864. He served as a Republican legislator in the California State Assembly twice. Heath was elected in November 1882 and re-elected in 1884 to represent district 50.

In 1866, Heath moved south to Santa Cruz County, California, where he continued to farm. He also was a hardware merchant and then president of the Santa Cruz County Bank. The hardware store was on Pacific Avenue in Santa Cruz and partly owned by John Byrne. Later he entered the real estate business as a partner with Samuel Drennan.

== Personal life ==
Heath died on December 19, 1888, at the age of 69 while on a trip to the East Coast and was buried at Evergreen Cemetery in Santa Cruz. Heath’s brother Albert was a captain for the Union Army during the American Civil War, and son Frank was a landscape artist, while the other son Henry followed in his father’s footsteps as a merchant.

Political offices
Preceded by new office	Secretary of State of Oregon; 1859–1862	Succeeded by Samuel E. May
