= Benjamin F. Harding =

American politician (1823–1899)

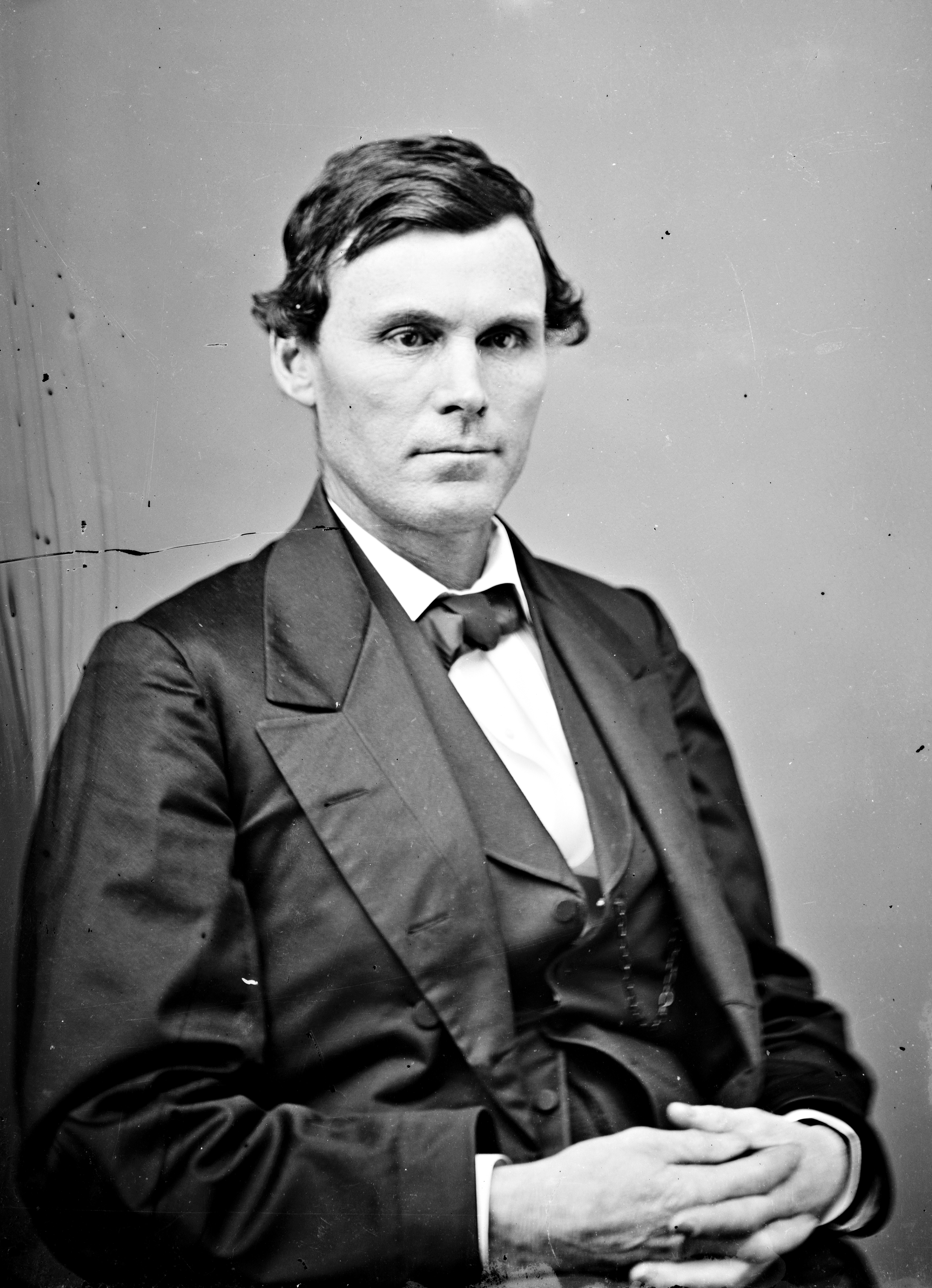

United States Senator from Oregon
- In office September 12, 1862 – March 3, 1865
- Preceded by: Benjamin Stark
- Succeeded by: George Henry Williams

Secretary of the Oregon Territory
- In office January 27, 1855 – March 3, 1859
- Preceded by: George Law Curry
- Succeeded by: Lucien Heath (under state government)

2nd Speaker of the Oregon House of Representatives
- In office 1860–1861
- Preceded by: William G. T'Vault
- Succeeded by: Joel Palmer

Personal details
- Born: January 4, 1823 Tunkhannock, Pennsylvania, U.S.
- Died: June 16, 1899 (aged 76) Cottage Grove, Oregon, U.S.
- Party: Democratic
- Spouse(s): Elizabeth Cox (d. 1868); F. W. Bush
- Profession: Attorney

Benjamin Franklin Harding (January 4, 1823 – June 16, 1899) was an American attorney and politician born in Pennsylvania. He held political offices in the Oregon Territory and later served as a United States senator from the state of Oregon.

== Early life ==
He was born near Tunkhannock, Pennsylvania, on January 4, 1823. Harding was educated in the public schools before he studying law. He passed the bar in 1847, and then set up practice in Joliet, Illinois, in 1849. In 1850, he moved first to California, and then to the Oregon Territory.

== Oregon politics ==
Harding was elected to the Oregon Territorial Legislature in 1850 to represent Marion County. Two years later he returned to that body and served as Speaker of the House of Representatives. Harding was then selected as United States district attorney in 1853. From 1854 to 1859 he served as the Secretary of the Oregon Territory, predecessor to the office of Oregon Secretary of State.

In 1858, Harding was elected to the Oregon State Legislature, but as Oregon had not yet been admitted to the Union, the assembly only met briefly before disbanding until 1859, when a special session was held and Harding served at the session. In 1860, he was elected again as a Democrat representing Marion County. At the next session of the legislature Harding was elected as Speaker of the Oregon House of Representatives, and this would be his final session in the state legislature.

Harding was elected to the United States Senate to fill Edward D. Baker's seat after the latter had died. He served from September 12, 1862, to March 3, 1865. While in the Senate, he and fellow Oregon Senator James Nesmith were the only Democrats in that chamber to vote for the Thirteenth Amendment to the United States Constitution to abolish slavery.

== Later life and family ==
Harding was married twice, first in 1851 to Elizabeth Cox, with whom he had several children. After she died in 1868, he married F.W. Bush, a relative of Asahel Bush. After serving in the Senate, Harding retired to his farm near Salem. A few years later he moved to Cottage Grove, Oregon, where he died on June 16, 1899, and was buried at Cottage Grove Cemetery.

U.S. Senate
Preceded by Benjamin Stark	U.S. senator (Class 2) from Oregon; 1862–1865; Served alongside: James W. Nesmith	Succeeded by George H. Williams
