= Recovery Dharma =

Buddhist recovery non-profit organization

Recovery Dharma is a non-profit organization founded in 2019 with the mission of supporting peer-led groups using Buddhist practices and principles for recovery from addiction. As of 2020, Recovery Dharma had an estimated 16,000 members and was the most extensive Buddhist recovery peer-support program in the USA.

== History ==
Following sexual misconduct allegations against founder Noah Levine, the board of directors of the non-profit organization Refuge Recovery sought to distance themselves from him.

== Book ==
The basis of the program is the Recovery Dharma book, which was written collectively by a group of anonymous volunteers and published in 2019. The book was released under a Creative Commons license and distributed for free in various digital formats on the organization's web site, with a self-published, low-cost print version also available for purchase through Amazon.

== Program ==
The program (described in the book as the "Practice") involves seven elements:

1. Renunciation, abstaining from the problem substance or behavior;
2. Meditation, developing a daily practice;
3. Meetings, connecting with others and becoming part of a community;
4. The Path, developing an understanding of the Four Noble Truths and Eightfold Path of Buddhism;
5. Inquiry and Investigation, engaging in a structured process of self-reflection with others;
6. Sangha, Wise Friends, Mentors, supporting others in the program; and
7. Growth, continuing to reflect, study, and attend retreats to deepen one's understanding.

The program is used to address many different types of addiction, with just under half of participants reporting substance use as their primary issue, while others indicate concurrent issues as their primary concern.

== Effectiveness ==
In a 2023 study of 209 Recovery Dharma members, the organization's program was found to be effective in the development of recovery capital, which is defined as "internal and external assets to initiate and sustain recovery from severe alcohol or other drug problems." The study indicated that peer support and frequency of meditative practice—as opposed to length of time spent in meditation—predicted greater recovery capital in program participants.
