= Bill Heath =

Bill Heath may refer to:

- Bill Heath (baseball) (born 1939), retired American baseball player
- Bill Heath (footballer) (born 1934), English football goalkeeper who played for Bournemouth and Lincoln City
- Bill Heath (politician) (born 1959), Republican member of the Georgia State Senate

== See also ==
- William Heath (disambiguation)
