= Raymond Dabb Yelland =

British-American painter (1848–1900)

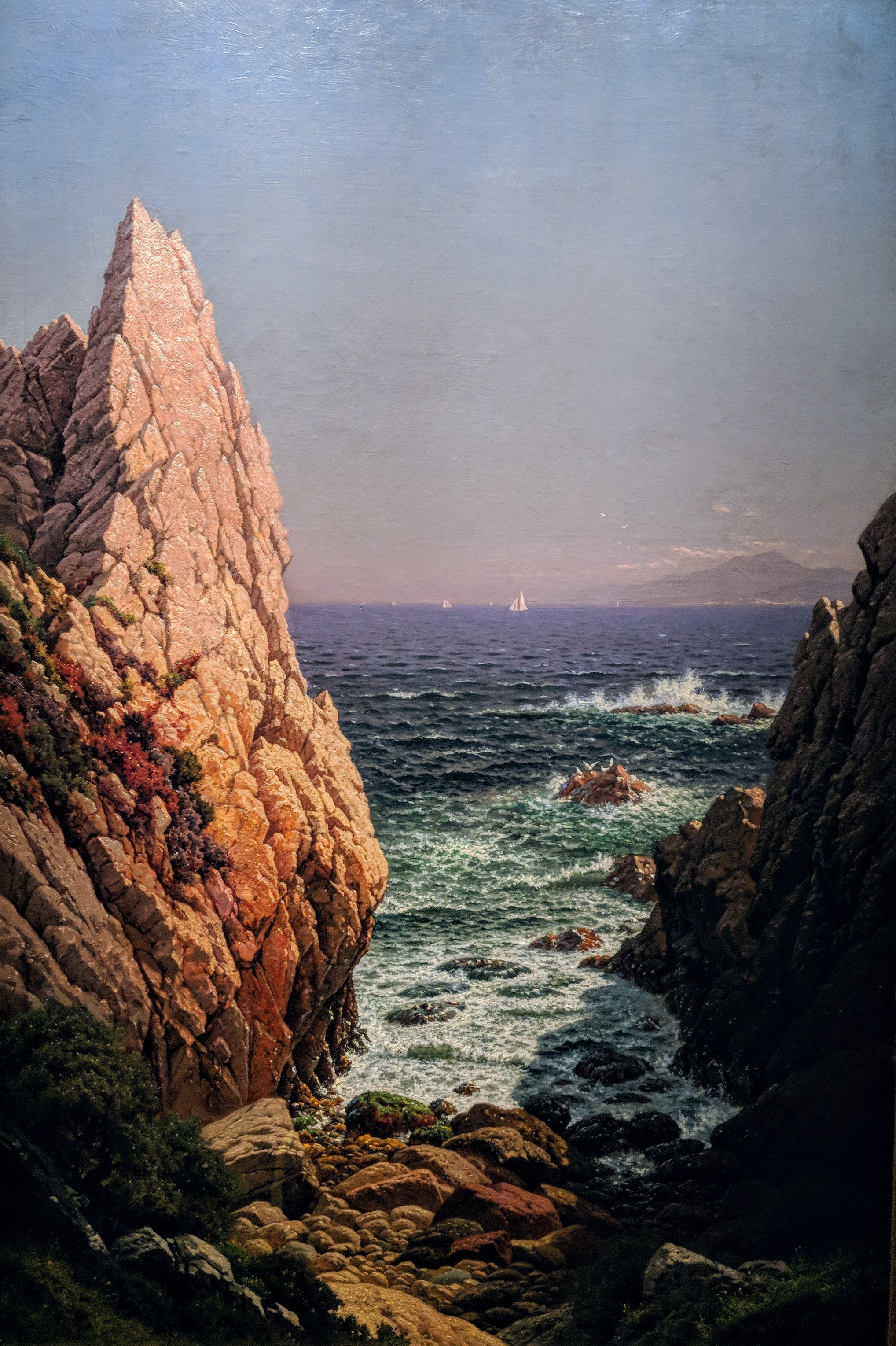
Yelland's Glimpse of Monterey Bay, 1879

Raymond Dabb Yelland (née Raymond Dabb; 1848–1900) was a British-American landscape painter and art instructor.

== Early life and education ==
Born Raymond Dabb in London, he came to the United States in 1850 as a young child, and was raised in Union, New Jersey, and later lived in neighboring Elizabeth, New Jersey. He served in the Union Army during the Civil War.

After his military service, he attended the Pennington Seminary. He then studied at the National Academy of Design in New York from 1868 to 1872, and was hired as an instructor for one year after his graduation.

== Career ==
In 1873, he was hired as a faculty member by Mills Seminary in Oakland, California, the first women's college west of the Rocky Mountains. He settled in Oakland with his wife, the former Annie Meeker.

In 1875, he legally changed his name, as did his wife, adding his mother's maiden name as their surnames.

Essentially a Realist, he specialized in painting the seashores and mountains of Northern California. Originally a follower of the Hudson River School, Yelland adopted a style called Luminism, inspired by artists such as Sanford Robinson Gifford and John F. Kensett. In the 1890s, Yelland was influenced by Tonalism, along with contemporaries like William Keith and George Inness. One of his paintings, Cities of the Golden Gate, a view of Oakland and San Francisco from the Berkeley hills, was described as "monumental" and a "heroic panorama bathed in a revelatory light".

Yelland taught for many years at the California School of Design (later known as San Francisco Art Institute), and also at the University of California, Berkeley in the years before his death. One of his notable students was Frank Lucien Heath.

== Death and legacy ==
Yelland became ill in the early months of 1900, and died of pneumonia at his home in Oakland that July.

The first solo exhibition of his work in 50 years took place at the Crocker Art Museum in Sacramento in 2018.

Raymond Dabb Yelland was the great-uncle of California architect William Raymond Yelland (1892–1966) and Jane Mary Yelland (1896–1968).
