= Ed Penniman =

American painter (born 1942)

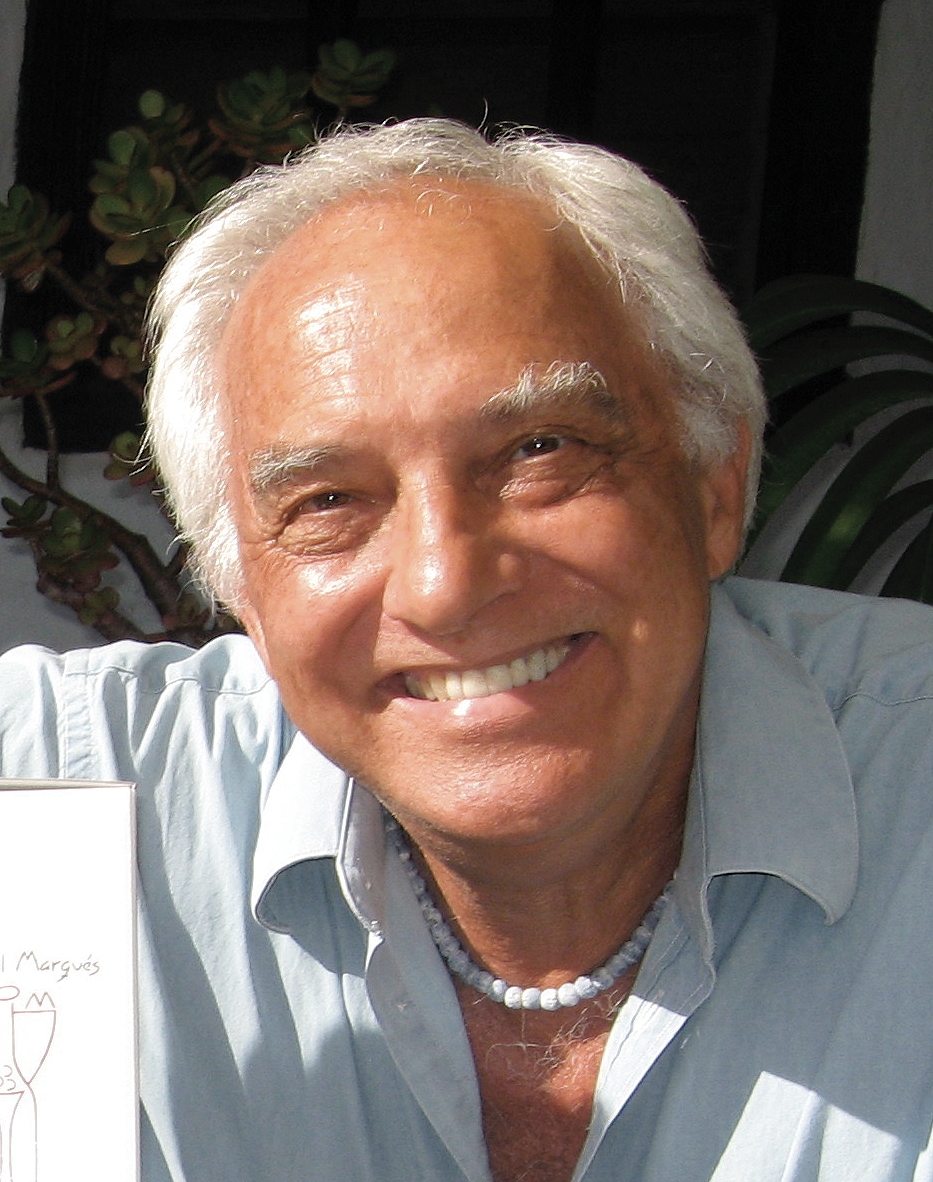
- Born: Edward George Penniman; May 12, 1942 (age 84); Santa Cruz, California, U.S.
- Education: Chouinard Art Institute (BFA)
- Occupations: Graphic designer, painter, curator
- Known for: Landscape painting, book cover design
- Movement: California Impressionism
- Awards: "50 Best Book Covers of the Year" by American Institute of Graphic Arts
- Website: edpenniman.faso.com

Edward "Ed" George Penniman (born May 12, 1942) is an American graphic designer, and painter. He is known for his oil and watercolor paintings of California's Central Coast. The American Institute of Graphic Arts selected his 1974 book design as one of the 50 best designed book covers of the year, and he has won numerous awards for his paintings and designs. He was commissioned by Santa Cruz County to design the official county flag in 1983.

His designs and artwork have been featured in magazines in the US, Europe, and Japan. Penniman authored You Are Up to You, a book documenting his near-death experience and recovery from Guillain–Barré syndrome, which left him a quadriplegic for three years.

== Early life and career ==
Edward George Penniman was born on May 12, 1942, in Santa Cruz, California, to parents Irene (née Costella) and Warren Penniman Sr. His father, Warren Penniman, was the owner of Penniman Title in Santa Cruz. He is of Italian and English descent. Penniman's grandmother, Leonora (née Naylor) Penniman was a well-known artist, began teaching him watercolors when he was seven years old. His grandfather, T.F. Costella, was contracted to do the cement work for the Giant Dipper in Santa Cruz in 1924.

Penniman graduated with a Bachelor of Fine Arts degree from Chouinard Art Institute in Los Angeles.

== Career ==
In 1965, he was an art director at Ogilvy Advertising Agency (formerly Carson-Roberts) art directing print and TV advertising for companies including Baskin-Robbins, Singer, and Mattel.

Schwan Lagoon, by Penniman

Penniman rose to prominence as an artist in the early 1970s, winning awards for his unique graphic design and artwork. He founded Ed Penniman and Associates, Advertising Design in Santa Cruz where he designed award-winning art and graphics for wineries, the Santa Cruz Symphony, the Santa Cruz Beach Boardwalk, and the Cabrillo Festival of Contemporary Music.

Penniman's work has been featured in Communication Arts magazine, Graphic Elements of the World, Volume 1, and The Book of American Trademarks.

He designed for the book, Planet Steward Journal of a Wildlife Sanctuary (1974) written by Stephen Levine, and that book cover was included in the 50 Best Book Designs of the Year by the American Institute of Graphic Arts. He was awarded a Gold Medal at the Orange County Fair for his design of Bargetto Winery's wine label. Penniman was commissioned by Santa Cruz County to design their official flag, which was adopted by the Board of Supervisors on July 4, 1983.

In 1984, at age 42, Penniman was diagnosed with Guillain-Barré Syndrome, a nerve disorder that paralyzed him and left him a quadriplegic for three years. During his rehabilitation, he was given an easel and paints. He could only move his head, so he learned to use his mouth to hold his paint brushes. He slowly regained the use of his arms and legs, and followed the artist trail of Winslow Homer throughout the island of Eleuthera, as well as following Paul Gauguin's artist path to Tahiti, Moorea, and Rarotonga. Penniman's paintings have been featured in numerous exhibitions and publications.

Penniman is the former President of the Santa Cruz Art League, and the curator of the California Statewide Landscape Exhibition, one of the longest-running art exhibitions in California. The annual Landscape Exhibition at the Art League was originated by his grandmother, Leonora Penniman, in 1926.

== Awards and recognitions ==
- 1969 - Certificate of Distinction - Packaging Design/Wine Label Design - San Francisco Art Directors Club
- 1973 - Gold Medal - Wine Label Design - Bargetto Winery - Orange County Fair
- 1973 - Gold Award Best of Show - (ITCA) International Typographic Composition Association
- 1975 - Gold Medal - 50 Best Book Designs of the Year - Planet Steward Journal of a Wildlife Sanctuary - American Institute of Graphic Arts
- 1983 - Design of the Santa Cruz County Flag - Flags of the World
- 1991 - Silver Award - Natural History Museum of Santa Cruz Artwork - Monterey Advertising Association
- 2004 - 2 Silver Awards, 1 Bronze Award - Brand Identity, Corporate Identity, Business to Business Advertising - Beacon Awards presented by the Northern California Chapter of the Business Marketing Association
- 2020 - Voted Best Artist in Santa Cruz County by Good Times newspaper

== Publications ==
- 1971 - Featured Design, Packaging Design magazine
- 1972 - Ed Penniman Trademark Designs, The Book of American Trademarks
- 1973 - Communications Arts magazine - 6-page feature article
- 1986 - 38 Examples of Design work by Ed Penniman, Graphic Elements of the World, Volume 1 (Japan)
- 1986 - The History Behind the Santa Cruz Dukes of Rock and Roll - Hip Santa Cruz, Volume 3
- 2008 - You Are Up to You
- 2018 - Catamaran Literary Reader
