= James Heath =

James Heath may refer to:

- James Heath (historian) (1629–1664), English royalist historian
- James Heath (engraver) (1757–1834), English engraver
- James P. Heath (1777–1854), U.S. congressman from Maryland
- James E. Heath (active since 1834), first editor of the Southern Literary Messenger
- Sir James Heath, 1st Baronet (1852–1942), British Conservative Member of Parliament
- Jimmy Heath (1926–2020), American jazz musician
- Jim Heath (American football) (born 1956), former American football player and coach
- Jim Heath (born 1959), musician with The Reverend Horton Heat
- James Heath (boxer) (born 1960), American boxer
- James R. Heath (born 1962), American chemist
- Jamey Heath (active since 1997), Canadian political activist
- James Heath (golfer) (born 1983), English golfer

== Fiction ==
- Jim Heath, a character in 1925 American film serial Ace of Spades
