= Lorenzo P. Latimer =

American painter and art teacher (1857–1941)

Lorenzo Palmer Latimer
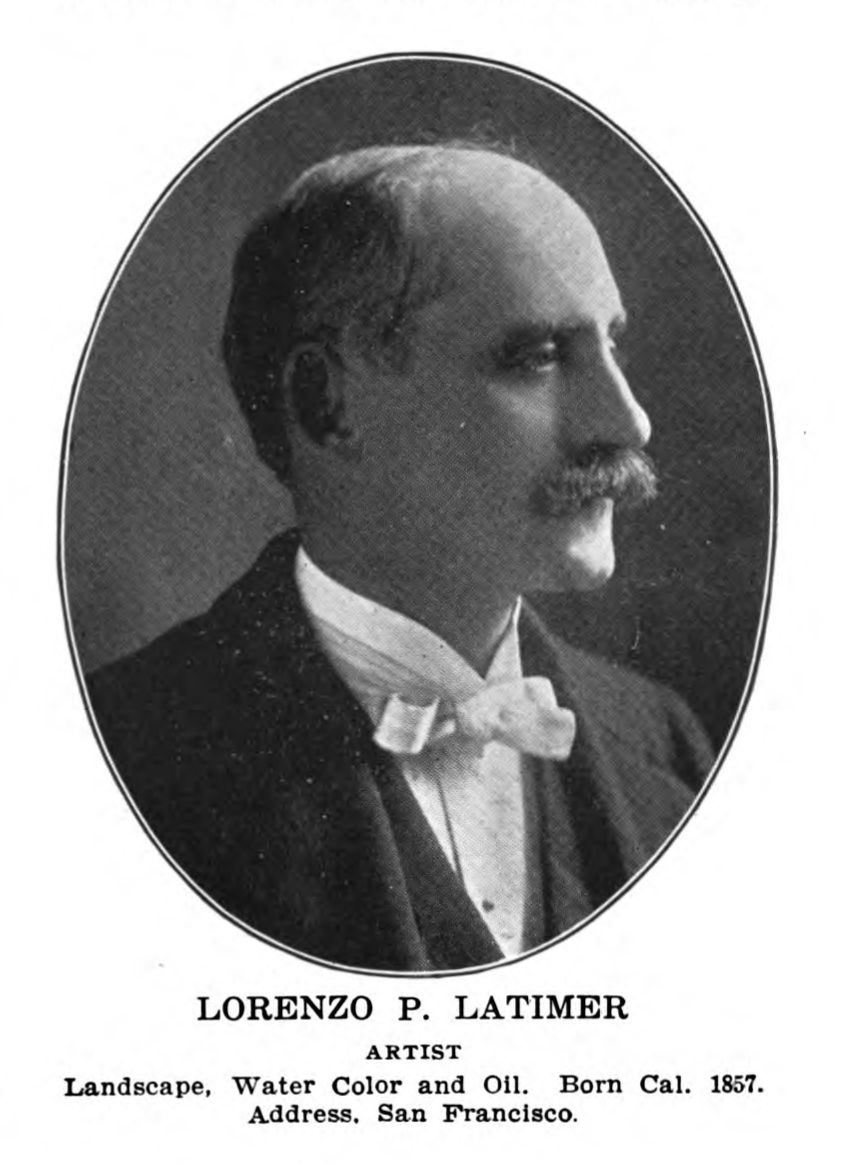
- Born: 1857; Gold Hill, California, U.S.
- Died: January 14, 1941 (aged 83–84); Berkeley, California, U.S.
- Resting place: Cypress Lawn Memorial Park
- Education: McClure Military Institute
- Alma mater: San Francisco Art Institute
- Occupation: Painter
- Spouse: Jennie Latimer
- Children: 1 son

Lorenzo Palmer Latimer (1857 – January 14, 1941) was an American painter and educator. He painted and taught art in San Francisco, California and Reno, Nevada.

== Life ==
Latimer was born in 1857 in Gold Hill, California (formerly, Granite Hill). His father, also named Lorenzo Latimer, was a judge. He was educated at the McClure Military Institute in Oakland, and he graduated from the San Francisco Art Institute.

Latimer taught art at the San Francisco Mechanics' Institute from 1893 to 1905, and later in Ukiah. He took annual trips to Nevada to paint from 1916 onward, and he taught in Reno. He mentored many early 20th-century landscape painters in Nevada, including Mattie S. Conner, Marguerite Erwin, Dora Groesbeck, Hildegard Herz, Nettie McDonald, Minerva Pierce, Echo Mapes Robinson, Nevada Wilson, and Dolores Samuels Young. He was the second vice president of the San Francisco Art Association from 1900 to 1912, and he founded the Latimer Art Club in Reno in 1921. He won many awards at art fairs.

With his wife Jennie, Latimer had a son, also named Lorenzo Latimer. He died of a heart attack on January 14, 1941, in Berkeley, California, at age 83, and he was buried in the Cypress Lawn Memorial Park. His work can be seen at the Nevada Museum of Art in Reno and the Robert Louis Stevenson Museum in St. Helena, California.
