= Eric Heath =

Eric Heath may refer to:

- Eric Heath (architect) (1894–1952), Australian architect
- Eric Heath (artist) (1923–2025), New Zealand artist
