= Christopher Heath (minister) =

English minister of the Catholic Apostolic Church

Christopher Heath (1802–1876) was an English minister of the Catholic Apostolic Church.

== Life ==
Heath was born in London on 26 March 1802. His grandfather, Benjamin Heath, was a velvet manufacturer in Birmingham. His father, John Heath, was a surgeon in the navy, who, after being present in Lord Howe's action of 1 June 1794, left the sea service and practised at 69 Hatton Garden as a surgeon dentist.

The son, Christopher, entered St Paul's School, London, 1 November 1813; in 1817 became a pupil under his father, and eventually succeeded to his profession. He was brought up in the church of England, but being attracted by the preaching of Edward Irving at the Caledonian Chapel, Cross Street, Hatton Garden, became a member of his congregation there in May 1832.

He moved with Irving when he took his congregation to Newman Street Hall on 24 October 1832, and was called to be an elder of the church. Some time after Irving's death (3 June 1835) Heath was appointed to succeed him as angel or minister of the congregation, being ordained by John Bate Cardale, the apostle. At this point he gave up his profession, and moved to 14 Newman Street, adjoining the church. In course of time, finding that the Newman Street Hall was small and inconvenient, in conjunction with his deacons he obtained plans from Raphael Brandon for an early English building in Gordon Square. He laid the first stone in 1851, and the Church of Christ the King, Bloomsbury was opened on Christmas Eve 1853.

The west end of the church was, however, never finished, owing to want of funds. Here he and his congregation continued to be the central point in London of the Catholic Apostolic church (commonly called the Irvingite church). He paid official visits to the branch churches in France, Belgium, Switzerland, Germany, and Denmark. But his main work was in London, where he was a trustee and administrator of church funds.

He died of congestion of the lungs at 3 Byng Place, Gordon Square, on 1 November 1876.

== Family ==
On 20 Nov. 1827 he married Eliza, daughter of James Barclay; she died at 40 Gordon Square, on 3 July 1884, aged 78; by her he had a large family. Of his sons, Christopher Heath (1835–1905), was a well-known surgeon in London, who was best known for his work Injuries and Diseases of The Jaws.
