= William Heath (Jamaican politician) =

Jamaican politician

William Heath was elected to the House of Assembly of Jamaica in 1820. His other biographical details are uncertain.
