= John Battendieri =

American businessman

John Battendieri is a businessman and pioneer of the U.S. Organic movement.

== History ==
Raised in New Jersey, Battendieri has been working since he came to California in the early 1970s to bring natural food to people. He initially produced "Mr. Natural" apple juice, which paved the way for other growers to recognize a demand for packaged organic products and follow suit. Mr. Natural claims to be "one of the original makers of organic juices--definitely the only pure Santa Cruz mountain apple juice" at that time on the market.

He is a former president of Organic Food Products Inc., a Morgan Hill company that merged with Spectrum Naturals in May 1999 and produces Millina’s Finest pasta sauces and products.

He is the founder of Santa Cruz Organic, which is now owned by J.M. Smucker.

He is the CEO of Blue Horizon Organic Seafood Company, based in Aptos, California, which produces hormone and antibiotic-free shrimp that is raised by family farmers using sustainable and organic methods. Their Last Minute Chef products have no MSG, preservatives, or flavor-enhancing synthetic chemicals. Because California does not have an official definition for "organic seafood", New Leaf Markets has sold the shrimp from Blue Horizon as "Organic Everywhere But California."

== Charity ==
Battendieri has participated with friends the past several years in the Santa Cruz Cancer Benefit Group (SCCBG) to raise funds for cancer research and treatment through Gourmet Grazing on the Green, a charitable food fest of local produce. Formed in 1995, the Santa Cruz Cancer Benefit Group has given over $800,000 to fund support services and cancer research. Mr. Battendieri is a founder. Earlier charitable work includes donations to Second Harvest Food Bank based on every jar of sauce sold. This was estimated to be about 12,000 free meals in Santa Cruz county in 1994.
