= Christopher Heath (surgeon) =

English anatomist and surgeon (1835–1905)

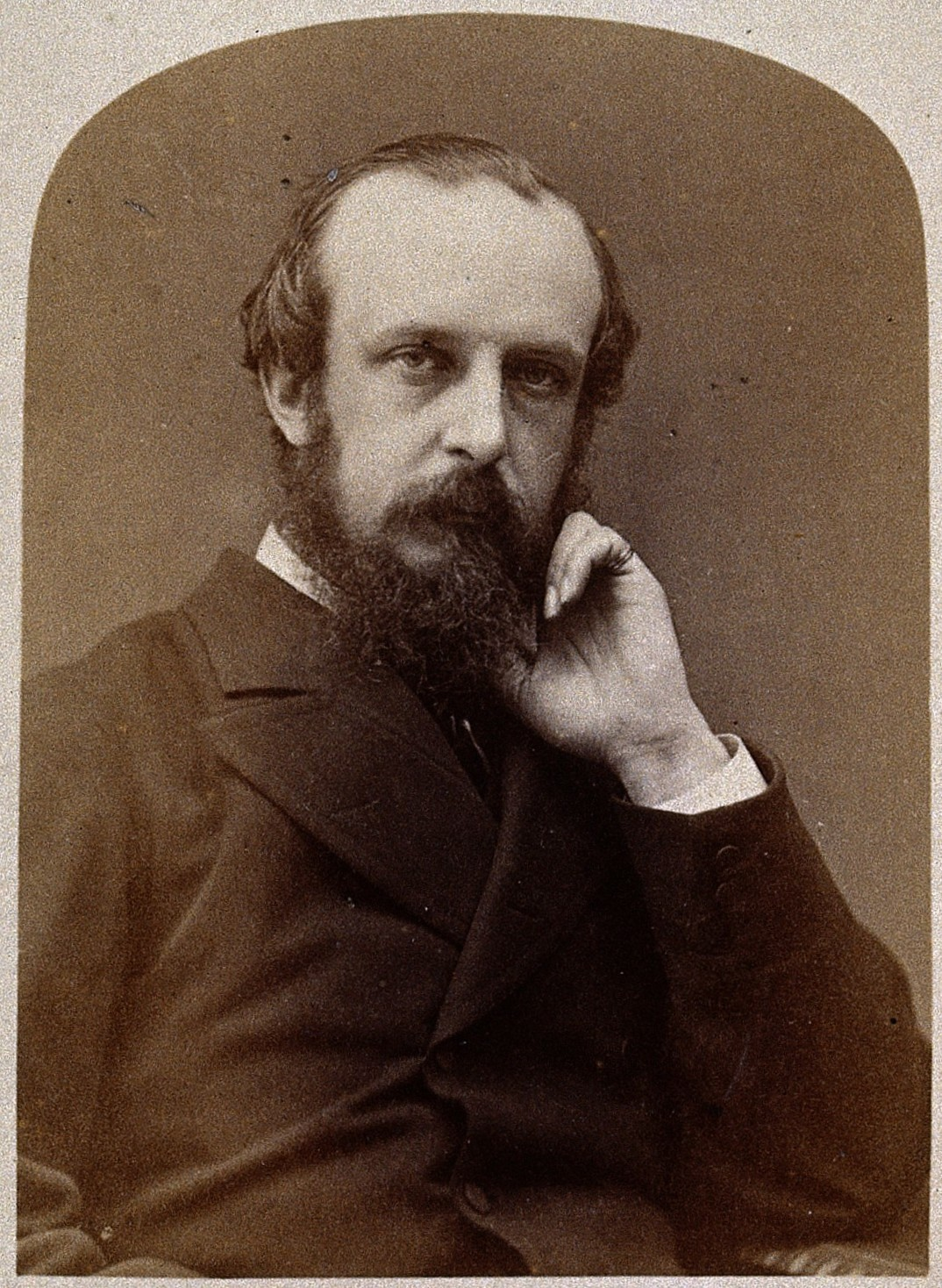
Christopher Heath

Christopher Heath FRCS (13 March 1835 – 8 August 1905) was an English anatomist and general surgeon

== Life ==
Born in London on 13 March 1835, he was the son of Christopher Heath, minister in the Catholic Apostolic Church, by Eliza Barclay his wife. He entered King's College School in May 1845, and after apprenticeship to Nathaniel Davidson of Charles Street, Manchester Square, began his medical studies at King's College, London, in October 1851. Here he gained the Leathes and Warneford prizes for proficiency in medical subjects and divinity, and was admitted an associate in 1855.

From 11 March to 25 September 1855 Heath served as hospital dresser on board HMS Imperieuse, during the Crimean War. He became M.R.C.S. England in 1856, and F.R.C.S. in 1860. He was appointed assistant demonstrator of anatomy at King's College, and served as house surgeon at King's College Hospital to Sir William Fergusson from May to November 1857. In 1856 he was appointed demonstrator of anatomy at Westminster Hospital, where he was made lecturer on anatomy and assistant surgeon in 1862. In 1858 he was consulting surgeon to the St. George and St. James Dispensary; in 1860 he was appointed surgeon to the West London Hospital at Hammersmith, and in 1870 he was surgeon to the Hospital for Women in Soho. Meanwhile, in 1866 he was appointed assistant surgeon and teacher of operative surgery at University College Hospital, becoming full surgeon in 1871 on the retirement of Sir John Eric Erichsen, and Holme professor of clinical surgery in 1875. He resigned his hospital appointments in 1900, when he was elected consulting surgeon and emeritus professor of clinical surgery.

At the Royal College of Surgeons Heath was awarded the Jacksonian prize in 1867 for his essay upon the Injuries and Diseases of the Jaws, including those of the Antrum, with the treatment by operation or otherwise. He was a member of the board of examiners in anatomy and physiology (1875–1880), an examiner in surgery (1883–1892), and in dental surgery (1888–1892), and was member of the council (1881–1897). He was Hunterian professor of surgery and pathology (1886-87), Bradshaw lecturer in 1892, and Hunterian orator in 1897, when he chose as his subject "John Hunter considered as a great Surgeon". He succeeded John Whitaker Hulke as president of the college on 4 April 1895, and was re-elected for a second term.

In 1897 Heath visited America to deliver the second course of Lane Medical Lectures recently founded at the Cooper Medical College in San Francisco. During this visit, McGill University of Montreal made him hon. LL.D. He was president of the Clinical Society of London in 1890-1, a fellow of King's College, London, and an associate fellow of the College of Physicians, Philadelphia. He lived for many years at 36 Cavendish Square, a house which is now rebuilt, and died there on 8 August 1905. He was known as teacher of both anatomy and surgery, and a tough-minded controversialist.

== Works ==
Heath's works, all published in London, were:

- A Manual of Minor Surgery and Bandaging, 1861; 12th edit. 1901.
- Practical Anatomy, a Manual of Dissections, 1864; 9th edit. 1902; translated into Japanese, Osaka, 1880.
- Injuries and Diseases of the Jaws, 1868; 4th edit. 1894; translated into French, 1884.
- Essay on the Treatment of Intrathoracic Aneurism by the Distal Ligature, 1871; re-issue 1898.
- A Course of Operative Surgery, 1877 2nd edit. 1884; translated into Japanese, Osaka, 1882.
- The Student's Guide to Surgical Diagnosis, 1879; 2nd edit. 1883. Philadelphia, 1879; New York, 1881.
- Clinical Lectures on Surgical Subjects, 1891; 2nd edit. 1895; second series 1902.

Heath edited the Dictionary of Practical Surgery, in 2 vols. 1886.

== Legacy ==
A marble bas-relief portrait by Hope Pinker commemorated Heath in the hall of the medical school buildings of University College Hospital.

== Family ==
Heath married (1) Sarah, daughter of the Rev. Jasper Peck; and (2) Gabrielle Nora, daughter of Captain Joseph Maynard, R.N., and left a widow, five sons, and one daughter.
