= Matt Heath =

Matt or Matthew Heath may refer to:

- Matt Heath (footballer), English footballer
- Matt Heath (actor), New Zealand actor
- Matthew John Heath, American mercenary
