= Lillian Dake Heath =

American painter (1864–1961)

- Born: Lillian Josephine Dake; August 2, 1864; Milwaukee, Wisconsin, U.S.
- Died: August 13, 1961 (aged 97); Santa Cruz County, California, U.S.
- Burial place: Evergreen Cemetery, Santa Cruz, California, U.S.
- Occupations: Painter, printmaker, educator
- Spouse: Frank Lucien Heath (m. 1897–1921; his death)
- Relatives: W. D. Storey (step-father), Lucien Heath (father-in-law)

Lillian Dake Heath (née Lillian Josephine Dake; August 2, 1864 – August 13, 1961) was an American painter, printmaker, and educator. She was known for her oil paintings and watercolors of landscapes, mountains and California missions. Heath also worked in the decorative arts, with painted fine china, and weaving. She is considered one of the pioneering artists in the city of Santa Cruz.

== Early life, and family ==
Lillian Dake Heath was born as Lillian Josephine Dake, born on August 2, 1864, in Milwaukee, Wisconsin, to parents Eliza Josephine (née Du Four) and Mose W. Dake. Her father died when she was a child. In 1877, as a teenager she moved with her widowed mother to Santa Cruz, California, where he mother married judge W. D. Storey. The Storey home was on High Street (at Storey Street) in the Mission Hill neighborhood of Santa Cruz, and was demolished in 1944. She graduated from Santa Cruz High School.

== Career and late life ==
In her early career Heath worked as a teacher at the Powder Mill Flat (now Paradise Park) starting in 1883. She left teaching in order to move to New York City and study art.

Heath returned to Santa Cruz in 1897 and studied with local artists including Lorenzo P. Latimer, Sydney J. Yard, and Frank Lucien Heath. Dake married her teacher Frank Lucien Heath on September 22, 1897 in Santa Cruz, California. They did not have any children. After marriage she lived at 1025 Third Street in Santa Cruz (formerly 21 Third Street), which was the Lucien Heath family home and is now demolished.

Heath taught women's art classes in Santa Cruz. She was a co-founder and member of the Santa Cruz Art League; and was a member of the Santa Cruz Women's Club. Heath was a long time member of the First Methodist Church (now the United Methodist Church Of Santa Cruz) in Santa Cruz.

Her notable exhibitions include the Women's Exchange Exhibition (1914), and the Santa Cruz Women's Club (1954).

After husband Frank died of an illness on April 21, 1921, in their home; she continued to make art from their art studio in Beach Hill. Heath died at age 97 on August 13, 1961, in Santa Cruz County, California. She was interred at Evergreen Cemetery in Santa Cruz.
