= Michael Heath =

Michael Heath may refer to:

- Mike Heath (baseball) (born 1955), baseball player
- Michael Heath (cartoonist) (born 1935), British strip cartoonist and illustrator
- Michael Heath (computer scientist) (born 1946), computer scientist who specializes in scientific computing
- Mike Heath (swimmer) (born 1964), former American Olympic swimmer
- Michael Heath (Paralympic swimmer) (born 1989), Canadian Paralympic swimmer
- Michael Heath, the Recorder of Lincoln

== See also ==
- Mickey Heath (1903–1986), baseball player
