= Hollis Heath =

American dramatist

- Education: City College of New York
- Occupation: Playwright

Hollis Heath is an American playwright, actress, and teaching artist. She received the AUDELCO award in 2012 for a play she co-wrote with Jaylene Clark Owens and Janelle Heatley Hinnant, Renaissance in the Belly of a Killer Whale.

Heath studied at The City College of New York, receiving a Bachelor of Arts in English with concentrations in theater and creative writing. She subsequently graduated with a master's degree in education in June 2016. The commencement address was delivered by Michelle Obama and Heath was one of the few students (out of 3800) to be commended for "writing an award-winning play as well as speaking at the White House about empowering women".

Heath is a native of Harlem and is an alumna of the drama program at Fiorello H. LaGuardia High School. In 2009, she collaborated with political artist and activist Sophia Dawson to curate her first show, "Wet Paint." In 2013, Hollis curated "Danger to the Darkness" with Mike McManus and Aaron Valentin, an art show to benefit A21, an organization that works to fight human trafficking around the globe. She has created summer drama workshops for New York City youth, and received the Harlem YMCA Community Impact Award for “dedication to the enrichment of the Harlem Community.”
