= Noah Levine =

American Buddhist teacher and writer

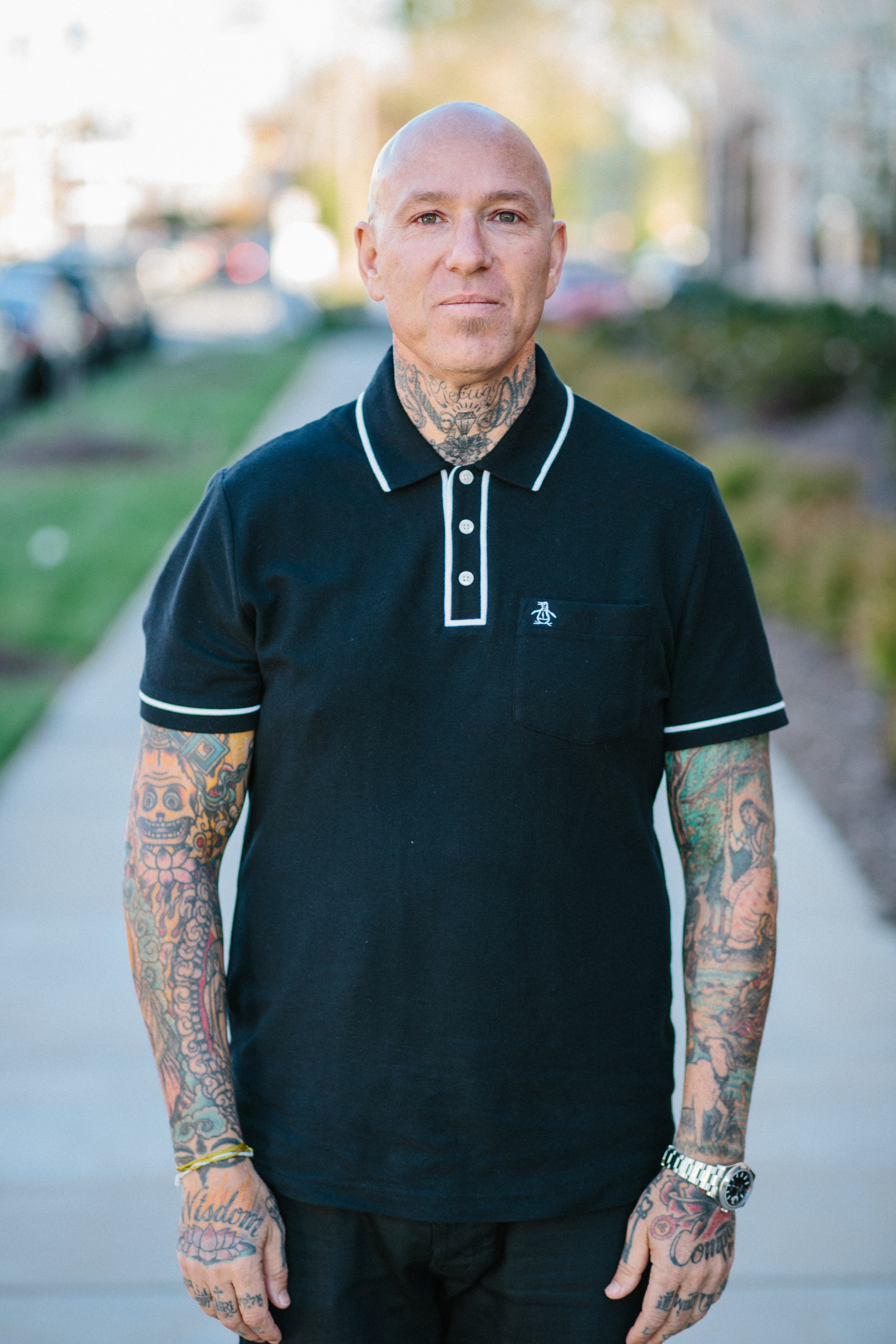

Personal life
- Born: 1971 (age 54–55) Santa Cruz, California, U.S.
- Occupation: Buddhist teacher; Author; Meditation instructor
- Website: www.againstthestream.com www.refugerecovery.org

Religious life
- Religion: Buddhism

Senior posting
- Teacher: Ajahn Amaro
- Based in: Los Angeles, CA

Noah Levine is an American author, Buddhist teacher, and meditation instructor. He is known in part for his memoir Dharma Punx (2003), which inspired a Buddhist countercultural movement combining meditation practice with punk and alternative subcultures. He founded the Against the Stream Buddhist Meditation Society and developed Refuge Recovery, a Buddhist approach to addiction recovery. In 2019, following allegations of sexual misconduct (which Levine denied), Refuge Recovery's board dissassociated themselves from him, forming a new organization (Recovery Dharma). He continues to teach and remains associated with Refuge Recovery.

== Early Life ==
Levine is the son of Buddhist author and meditation teacher Stephen Levine, whose spiritual circle included teachers such as Ram Dass, Jack Kornfield, and Joseph Goldstein. His parents divorced when he was young, and he has described rebelling against his father's spiritual interests during his adolescence.

Levine has said that he began using drugs and alcohol while still in elementary school. He discovered punk music as a child and has described hearing the Sex Pistols for the first time as a formative experience. During his adolescence, he struggled with substance use and was repeatedly arrested and detained in juvenile facilities.

In 1988, at the age of 17, Levine had three felony convictions and was facing multiple years in a youth prison. While in juvenile custody, he attempted suicide and woke up in a padded cell. During a subsequent telephone conversation with his father, Stephen encouraged him to try mindfulness meditation, instructing him to focus his attention on his breathing. Levine later described beginning a meditation practice during this period as a turning point in his life.

After becoming sober, Levine participated in twelve-step recovery programs while continuing his Buddhist meditation practice. He also became involved in the straight edge scene, a subculture within hardcore punk associated with abstinence from drugs and alcohol.

Levine received meditation teacher training from Jack Kornfield at Spirit Rock Meditation Center in Woodacre, California. He later earned a master's degree in counseling psychology from the California Institute of Integral Studies.

== Career ==
Levine's first book, Dharma Punx: A Memoir, was published in 2003. The book recounts his experiences with addiction, punk subculture, and Buddhist meditation. His writing explores the relationship between Buddhist practice and contemporary culture, particularly punk rock and addiction recovery. Levine’s four books have been published by HarperOne, an imprint of HarperCollins.

Following the book’s publication, Dharma Punx grew into a broader Buddhist countercultural movement, bringing together people drawn to Buddhist meditation and practice as well as punk and alternative subcultures. Levine initially led meditation groups in his living room, followed by groups in jails and studios in Santa Cruz and San Francisco. He began holding Dharma Punx classes in New York City in 2003. By December 2008, groups had also formed in Connecticut, Philadelphia, Seattle, Canada, and Hawaii. By 2009, the movement included more than 20 affiliated Dharma Punx groups across the United States, with centers also established in Canada.

Levine’s Buddhist teachers have included the Dalai Lama, Thich Nhat Hanh, Ram Dass, Jack Kornfield, and Ajahn Amaro.

In 2008, Levine founded the Against the Stream Buddhist Meditation Society (ATS), a Buddhist meditation organization based in Venice, California. It offers guided meditations, retreats, Buddhist teachings, individual sessions, and Refuge Recovery meetings. Levine also offers individual counseling sessions focused on meditation practice and addiction recovery.

Levine developed Refuge Recovery, a Buddhist approach to addiction recovery based on the Four Noble Truths and the Eightfold Path. In 2014, he published Refuge Recovery: A Buddhist Path to Recovering from Addiction, outlining the program's principles and practices. Drawing on his experience in twelve-step recovery, he sought an alternative to its Judeo-Christian language and emphasis on a higher power, which he said did not resonate with him. The program instead emphasizes meditation, mindfulness, and peer support. By early 2019, the nonprofit Refuge Recovery network had grown to more than 250 groups worldwide. A January 2019 report in Tricycle counted 618 weekly meetings across the United States.

Levine also co-founded the Mind Body Awareness Project, a nonprofit organization that provides mindfulness-based programs to incarcerated youth. The organization was established to bring meditation and related practices into juvenile detention facilities.

Levine wrote the liner notes for Alkaline Trio and One Man Army‘s BYO Split Series, Vol. 5, a 2004 split album.

In 2009, Levine gave a talk at the University of Southern California, sponsored by the USC Office of Religious Life and USC Spectrum, in which he discussed his path to Buddhist practice.

He later gave a talk as part of the Talks at Google series titled "Everyday Well-Being," discussing mindfulness, meditation, and his work with the Mind Body Awareness Project.

In 2015, Levine formed the hardcore punk band The Deathless, contributing lyrics and spoken-word performances.

=== Sexual misconduct allegations ===
In 2018, Levine was accused of sexual assault or misconduct by several women. The LAPD investigated these allegations but declined to file any charges. Ultimately Levine was removed from the ATS board of directors, and the board announced that its centers in Melrose, Santa Monica, and San Francisco would close as a result of financial difficulties stemming from the allegations against Levine.

Refuge Recovery's board of directors also sought to distance themselves from him. In July 2019, Los Angeles magazine reported that Levine's following had shrunk by around 50% as a result of the scandal. Levine maintains his innocence and has continued to teach.

== Reception and influence ==
In June 2019, actor Ben Affleck submitted a declaration in the legal trademark dispute involving Refuge Recovery House, crediting Levine and his Refuge Recovery program with helping turn his life around.

Musician Mike Ness, frontman of Social Distortion, praised Levine's memoir Dharma Punx for its account of overcoming violence, negativity, and self-destruction.

== Personal life ==
Levine is divorced and has two children.

== In popular culture ==
Levine is the subject of the feature-length documentary Meditate and Destroy, directed by Sarah Fisher. The film follows his personal history, Buddhist practice, and efforts to bring meditation to people involved in punk culture and addiction recovery.

Gaia produced a four-episode series featuring Levine titled “Dharma Punx: Guided Meditations with Noah Levine”, which included an account of his introduction to meditation and three guided meditation sessions.

The documentary Dharma Rebel (2020), directed by Babeth Mondini-VanLoo, focuses on Levine and his work with Against the Stream and Refuge Recovery.

The punk rock band NOFX referenced Levine in its song "Fuck Day Six", released on the album Double Album. The song's lyrics mention Levine and the Against the Stream organization in the context of the narrator's experience at a drug rehabilitation facility.

== Published works ==
- Levine, Noah (2004). Dharma Punx. HarperOne. ISBN 978-0060008956.
- Levine, Noah (2007). Against the Stream: A Buddhist Manual for Spiritual Revolutionaries. HarperOne. ISBN 978-0060736644.
- Levine, Noah (2011). The Heart of the Revolution: The Buddha's Radical Teachings on Forgiveness, Compassion, and Kindness. HarperOne. ISBN 978-0061711244.
- Levine, Noah (2014). Refuge Recovery: A Buddhist Path to Recovering from Addiction. HarperOne. ISBN 978-0062122841.

== See also ==
- Vipassana movement
