= Stephen Levine (author) =

American poet

Stephen Levine (July 17, 1937 – January 17, 2016) was an American poet, author and teacher best known for his work on death and dying. He is one of a generation of pioneering teachers who, along with Jack Kornfield, Joseph Goldstein and Sharon Salzberg, have made the teachings of Theravada Buddhism more widely available to students in the West. Like the writings of his colleague and close friend, Ram Dass (formerly Richard Alpert), Stephen's work is also flavoured by the devotional practices and teachings (also known as Bhakti Yoga) of the Hindu Guru Neem Karoli Baba. This aspect of his teaching may be considered one way in which his work differs from that of the more purely Buddhist oriented teachers named above. Allusions in his teachings to a creator, which he variously terms God, The Beloved, The One and 'Uugghh', further distinguish his work from that of other contemporary Buddhist writers.

== Life and career ==
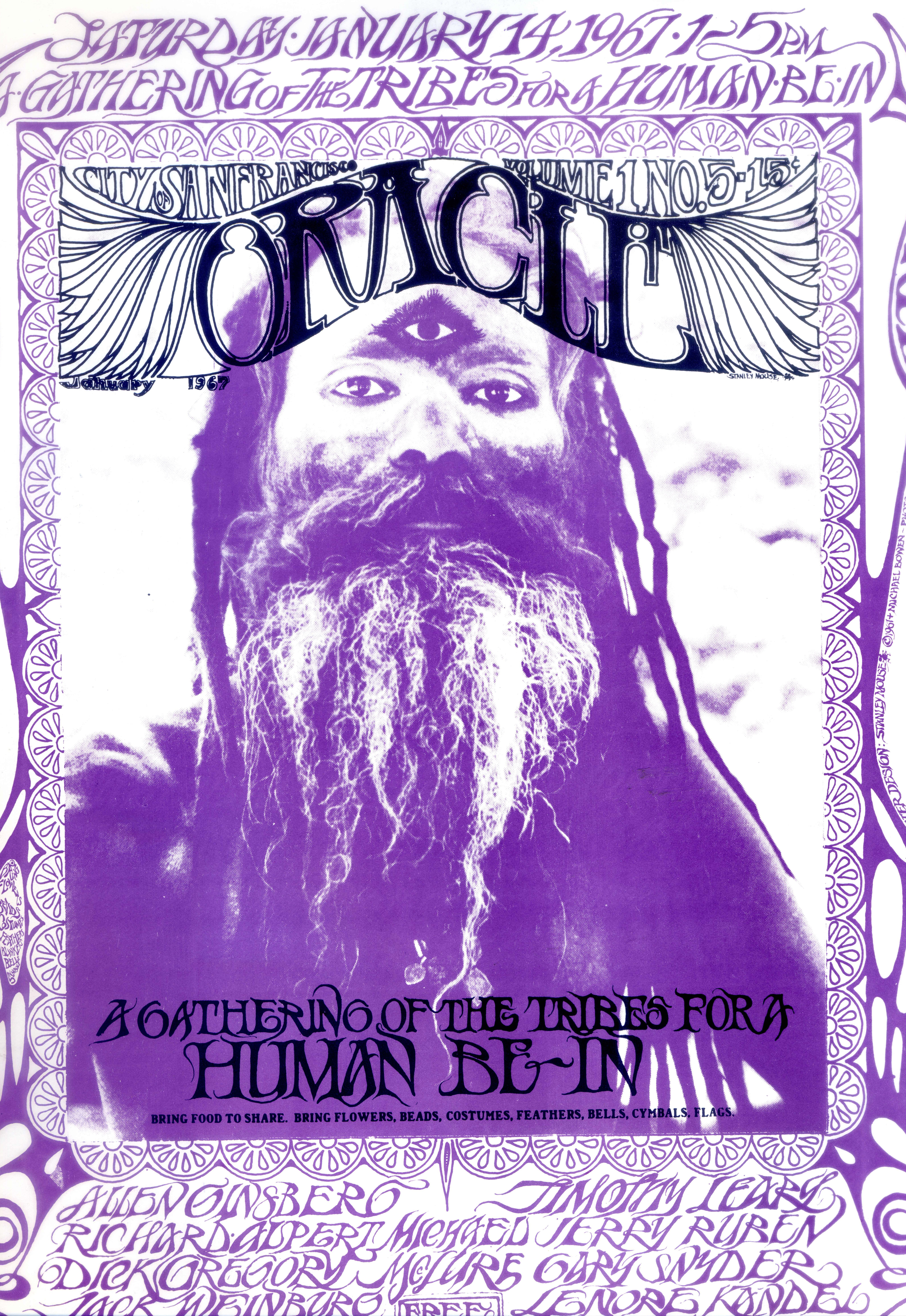
San Francisco Oracle Cover Vol.1 No.5, January 1967.

Born in Albany, New York, Levine attended the University of Miami. He published his first work, A Resonance of Hope, in 1959. After working as an editor and writer in New York City, Levine was one of the founders of the San Francisco Oracle in 1966.

Levine had a history of addiction to heroin and other drugs. He outlined his struggles with drugs in his book Turning towards the mystery.

He spent time helping the sick and dying, using meditation as a method of treatment; a program he shared with psychologist Richard Alpert (Ram Dass) and psychiatrist Elisabeth Kubler-Ross.

The author of several books about dying, Levine and his wife Ondrea spent one year living as if it were their last. He published a book about this experience in 1997, A year to live: how to live this year as if it were your last. Levine's son Noah initially rejected his father's work, then started to teach meditation on his own. Levine and his wife Ondrea appeared in the 2007 documentary, Meditate and Destroy, that focuses on the life of their son Noah Levine.

For many years, Stephen and Ondrea lived in near seclusion in the mountains of Northern New Mexico. Ondrea still lives in Northern New Mexico. Stephen Levine died at his home after a long illness on January 17, 2016, at the age of 78.

== Teaching ==
Although drawing upon the teachings of a variety of wisdom traditions, including Native American, Sufism and mystical interpretations of Christianity, Stephen's writing was most significantly informed by the teaching of the Theravada branch of Buddhism.

Grief Work

One of the most significant aspects of Stephen's work, and one for which he was perhaps best known, was his pioneering approach to working with the experience of grief. Over 34 years, Stephen and his wife Ondrea counselled concentration camp survivors and their children, Vietnam War veterans as well as victims of sexual abuse. Although Stephen acknowledged that personal experience of grief is perhaps at its most intense when a loved one dies, he also drew our attention to grief's more subtle incarnations. "Our ordinary, everyday grief" accumulates as a response to the "burdens of disappointments and disillusionment, the loss of trust and confidence that follows the increasingly less satisfactory arch of our lives." In order to avoid feeling this grief we "armour our hearts," which leads to a gradual deadening of our experience of the world When a loved one dies, or indeed when our own death approaches, the intensity of the loss often renders our defenses ineffective and we are swept up by a deluge of griefs, both old and new.

Levine's 1982 book Who Dies? An Investigation of Conscious Living and Conscious Dying, co-written with his wife Ondrea, has been described a "central resource" of the "conscious dying movement", and "one of the key New Age texts on dying".

== Teachers ==
In the acknowledgements section of Who Dies, Stephen paid tribute to a number of spiritual teachers whose work he acknowledged to have influenced his writing. As well as crediting "years of Buddhist practice and teaching," he cited the writings of Nisargadatta Maharaj, an Indian spiritual teacher and philosopher of Advaita (Nondualism), as well as Neem Karoli Baba and Ramana Maharshi.
