= Arthur A. Taylor =

American newspaper publisher (1849–1923)

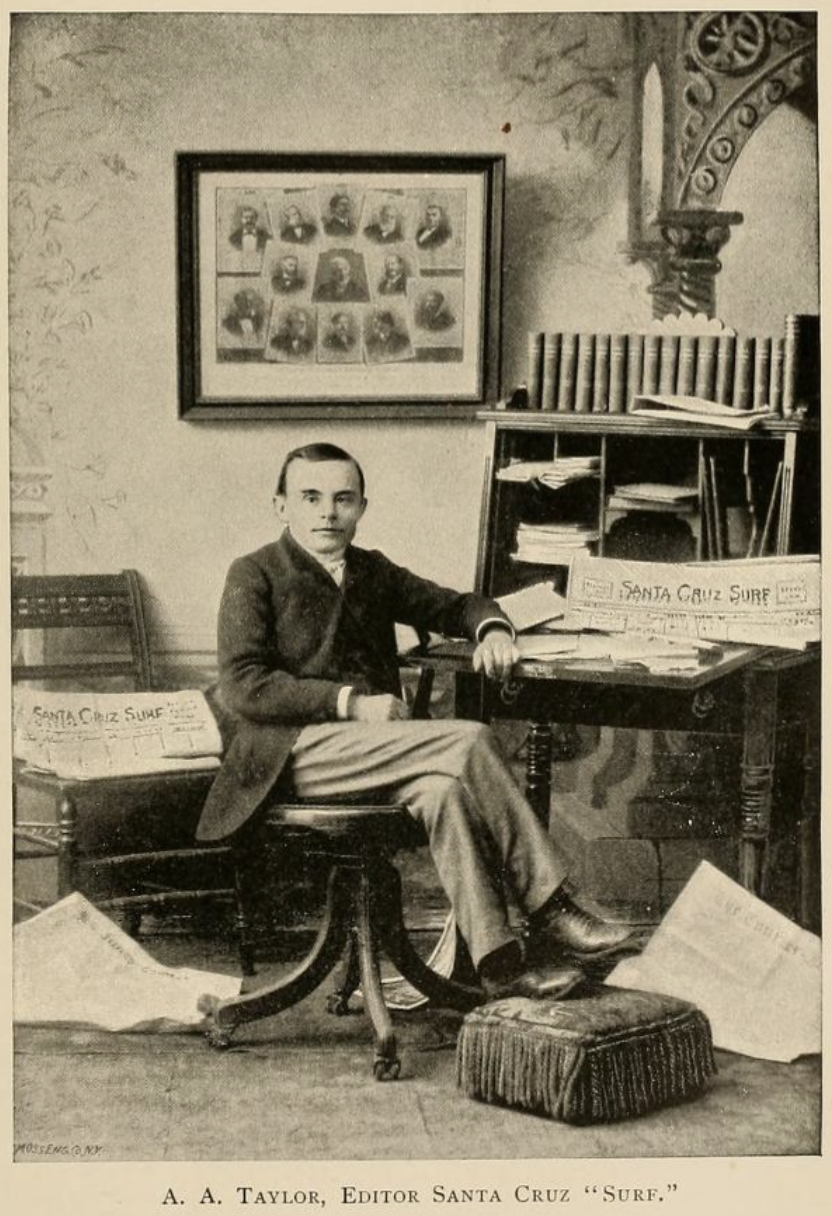
- Born: Arthur Adelbert Taylor; December 21, 1849; Smyrna, Chenango County, New York, U.S.
- Died: August 11, 1923 (aged 73); Santa Cruz, California, U.S.
- Burial place: Evergreen Cemetery, Santa Cruz, California, U.S.
- Other names: A. A. Taylor
- Occupations: Writer, journalist, newspaper editor, newspaper publisher

Arthur Adelbert Taylor (December 21, 1849 – August 11, 1923), commonly known as A. A. Taylor, was an American writer, newspaper editor and publisher. He owned the Surf Publishing Company, and the Courier–Item Publishing Company. Taylor published the Santa Cruz Surf newspaper (including the Santa Cruz Daily Surf, and Santa Cruz Weekly Surf) and The Courier–Item newspaper, in Santa Cruz, California. He also served as the secretary of the California Redwood Park Commission.

Taylor has a historical marker erected in his honor by the "Citizens of Santa Cruz County" at the Evergreen Cemetery.

== Publications ==
- Taylor, Arthur Adelbert (1912). California Redwood Park, Sometimes Called Sempervirens Park (PDF). Sacramento, California: William Richardson Publishing.
