= W. D. Storey =

English-born American lawyer (1830–1914)

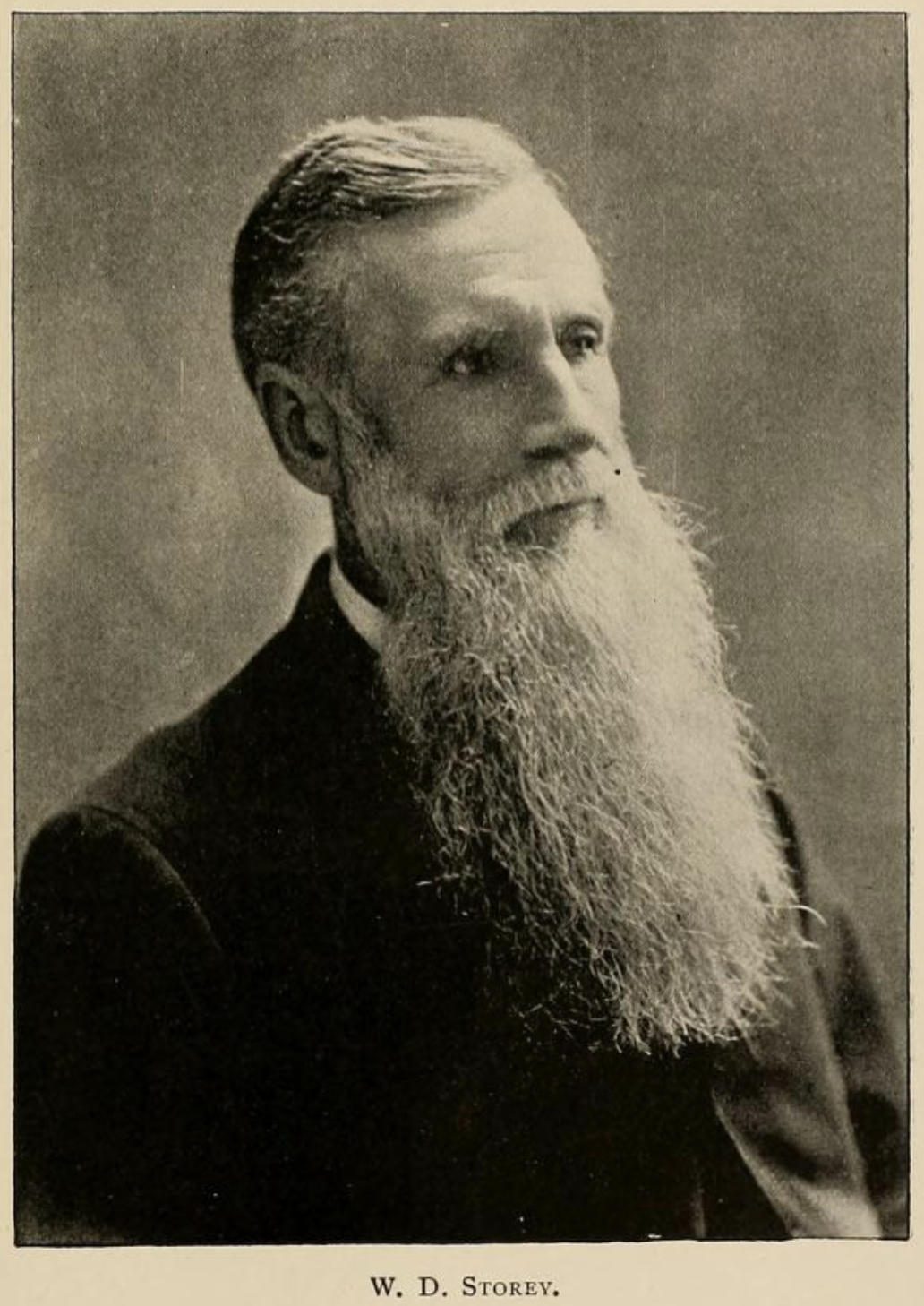
- Born: William Dalphin Storey; August 16, 1830; Yorkshire, England, U.K.
- Died: February 16, 1914 (aged 83); Santa Cruz, California, U.S.
- Burial place: Evergreen Cemetery, Santa Cruz, California, U.S.
- Other names: William Dalphen Storey
- Education: Lawrence University, Albany Law School
- Occupations: Judge, district attorney, lawyer, newspaper editor, teacher, farmer
- Spouse: Eliza Josephine Du Four (m. 1877)
- Relatives: Lillian Dake Heath (step-daughter)

William Dalphin Storey (August 16, 1830 – February 16, 1914), commonly known as W. D. Storey, was an English and American judge, lawyer, and the district attorney in Santa Cruz County, California. He also worked as a newspaper editor, teacher and farmer in his early life.

== Life and career ==
William Dalphin Storey was born on 1830, in Yorkshire, England. At the age of 1, his family moved to the United States, settling on the East Coast. He graduated in 1857 from Lawrence University in Appleton, Wisconsin, and in 1860 from Albany Law School in Albany, New York.

While attending college, Storey worked as a farmer and teaching. For three years he worked as the editor-in-chief of the Rochester Democrat and Chronicle, a Republican newspaper serving Western New York. He was admitted to the bar in New York state in 1860. In 1876, Storey moved to Santa Cruz County, California.

Storey married Eliza Josephine Du Four (later known as Eliza Josephine Dake) in 1877, and he helped raise two children from her first marriage, which included visual artist Lillian Heath (née Dake; 1864–1961).

In 1879, Storey was elected district attorney in Santa Cruz County. He took an active role in advocacy of the new constitution of the State of California in 1879. Storey served as the plaintiff for George W. Schell v. A. W. Gamble (1908), an estate case reviewed in the Supreme Court of California.

Storey was a supporter of the development of city electric light and city plumbing in Santa Cruz. He also was a temperance movement supporter.

He died of a "stroke of apoplexy" on February 16, 1914, in Santa Cruz.
