= George M. Heath =

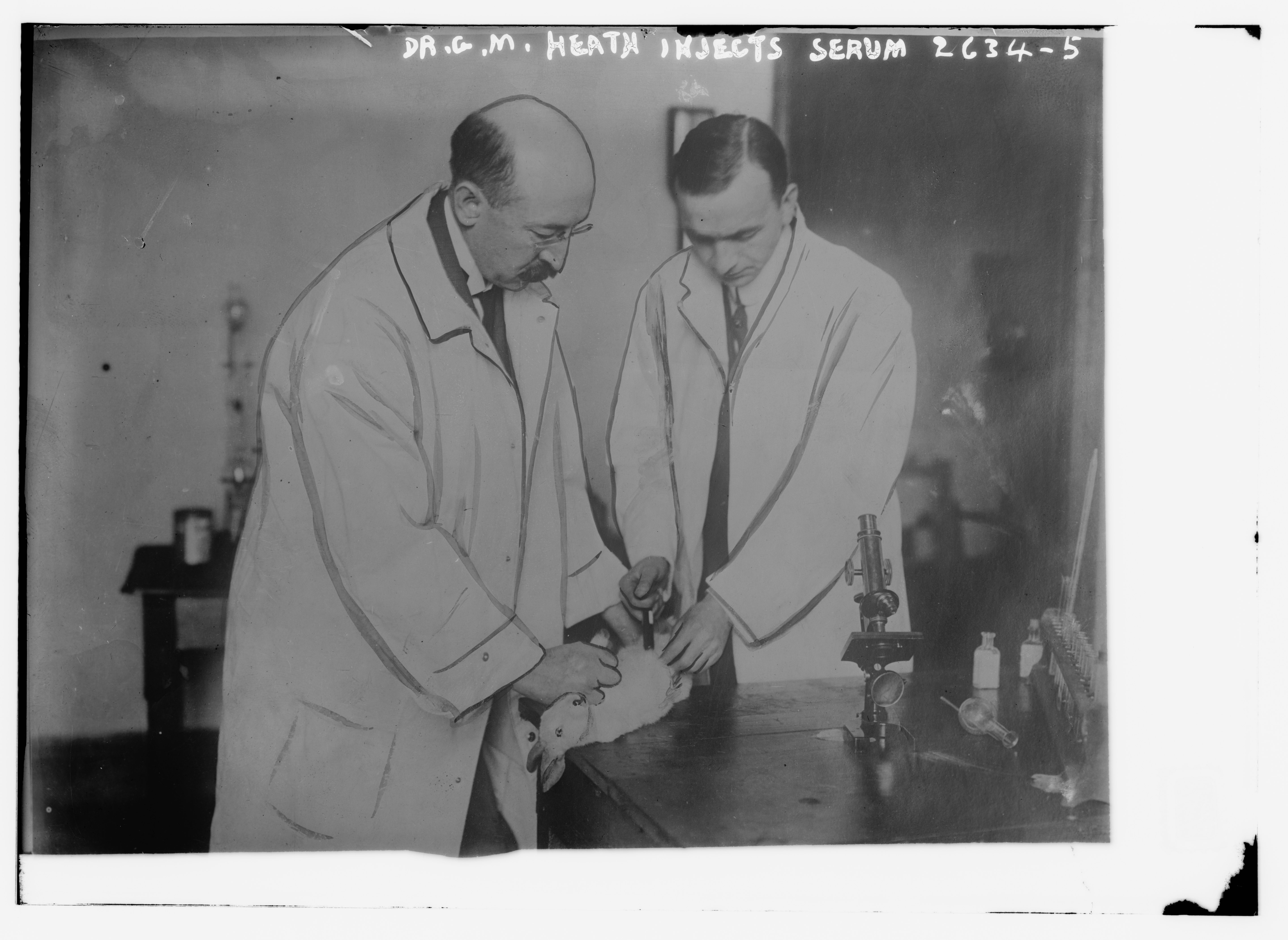
George M. Heath in 1913

George M. Heath was a St. Louis scientist who developed a tuberculosis serum in 1913. Charles E. Finlay a New York banker and real estate developer offered a reward of $1,000,000 for a cure for tuberculosis. George M. Heath offered his research to Finlay.
