= Frank Lucien Heath =

American painter (1857–1921)

- Born: July 3, 1857; Salem, Oregon, U.S.
- Died: April 21, 1921 (aged 63); Santa Cruz, California, U.S.
- Burial place: Evergreen Cemetery, Santa Cruz, California, U.S.
- Other name: F. L. Heath
- Education: California School of Design
- Occupations: Painter, teacher
- Spouse: Lillian Josephine Dake (m. 1897)
- Father: Lucien Heath

Signature
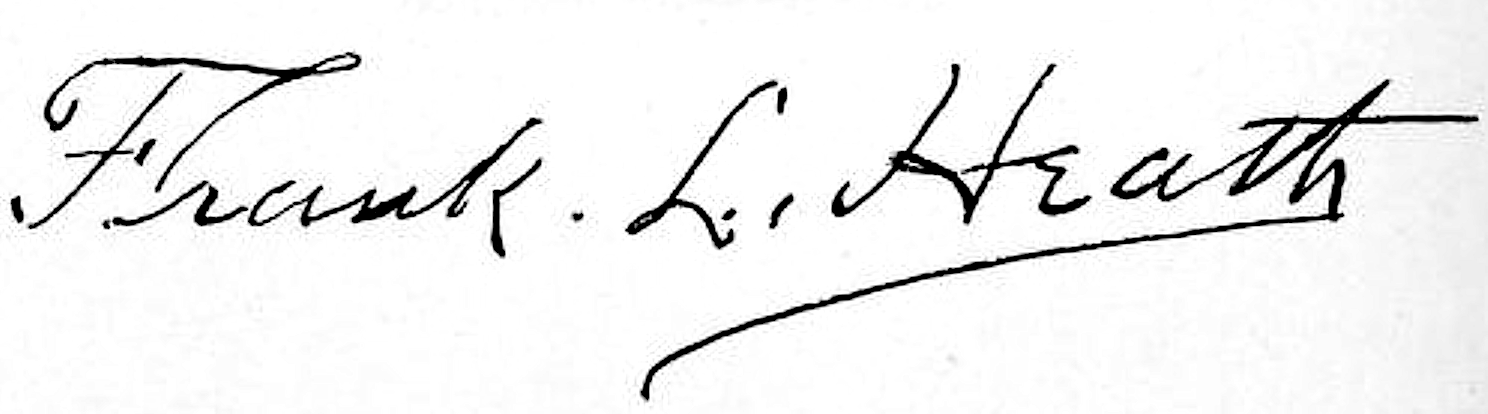

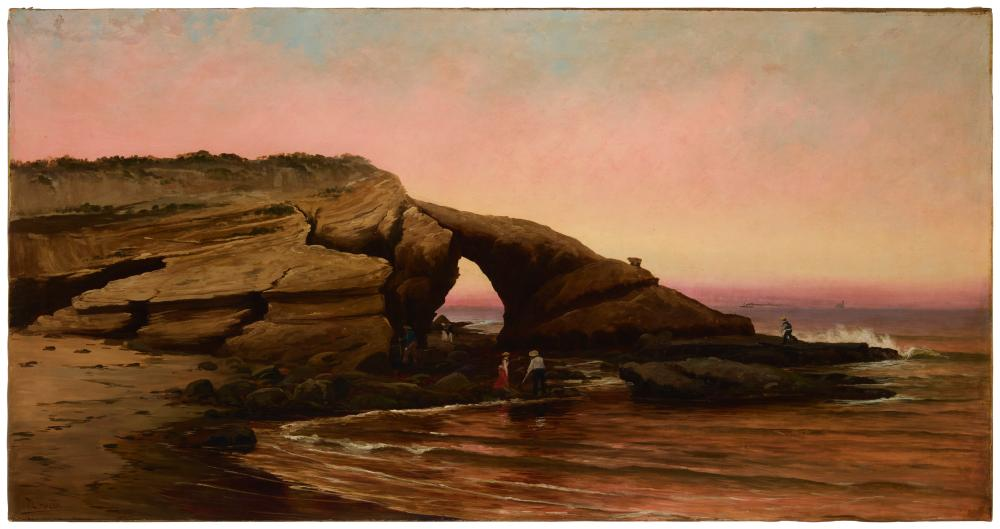
La Jolla Cove (Alligator Rock) (1887), by Frank L. Heath

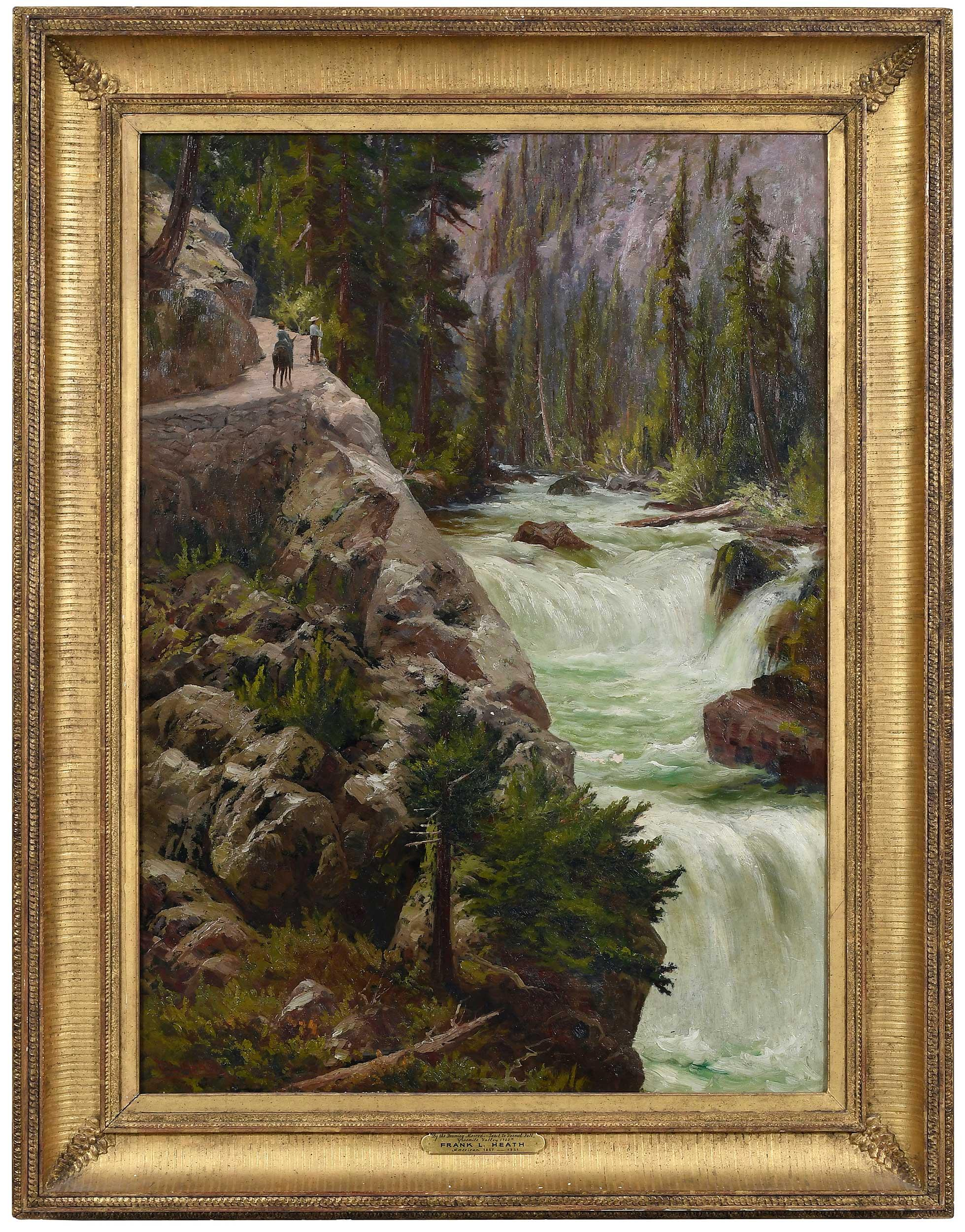
By the Foaming Merced, Yosemite Valley (before 1922), by Frank L. Heath

Frank Lucien Heath (July 3, 1857 – April 21, 1921), also known as F. L. Heath, was an American painter and teacher. He was known for his painted landscapes of the coast and the mountains, particularly of California and Oregon.

== Early life, education, and family ==
Frank Lucien Heath was born on July 3, 1857, in Salem, Oregon, to parents Jane (née Edwards) and Lucien Heath, a politician who was twice elected to the California State Legislature. The family moved in 1863 to Santa Cruz, California, where he was raised. At a young age he showed an interest in making art.

Heath attended California School of Design (later San Francisco Art Institute) in San Francisco, where he studied painting under Raymond Dabb Yelland and William Keith.

Heath was married to artist Lillian Josephine Dake (1864–1961) on September 22, 1897 in Santa Cruz, California. They did not have any children. He became a member of the Congregational Church, and after his marriage he participated in the Methodist Church.

== Career and late life ==
After graduation from college, Heath lived in San Francisco for the next 11 years. He moved back to Santa Cruz after and maintained an art studio on Beach Hill. Heath founded the Jolly Daubers in 1919 with Margaret Rogers, the forerunner to the Santa Cruz Art League. He was also the first president of that arts organization.

His notable exhibitions include the California State Fair (1888), the World's Columbian Exposition in Chicago (1893), and the Louisiana Purchase Exposition (1904).

His artwork can be found in collections, including at the Society of California Pioneers, the Monterey Museum of Art, and Santa Barbara Historical Museum.

== Death ==
Heath died of an illness on April 21, 1921, at his home in Santa Cruz. He was survived by his wife, who lived until age 97. He was interred at Evergreen Cemetery in Santa Cruz.
