= Electoral history of Willie Brown =

American politician election record

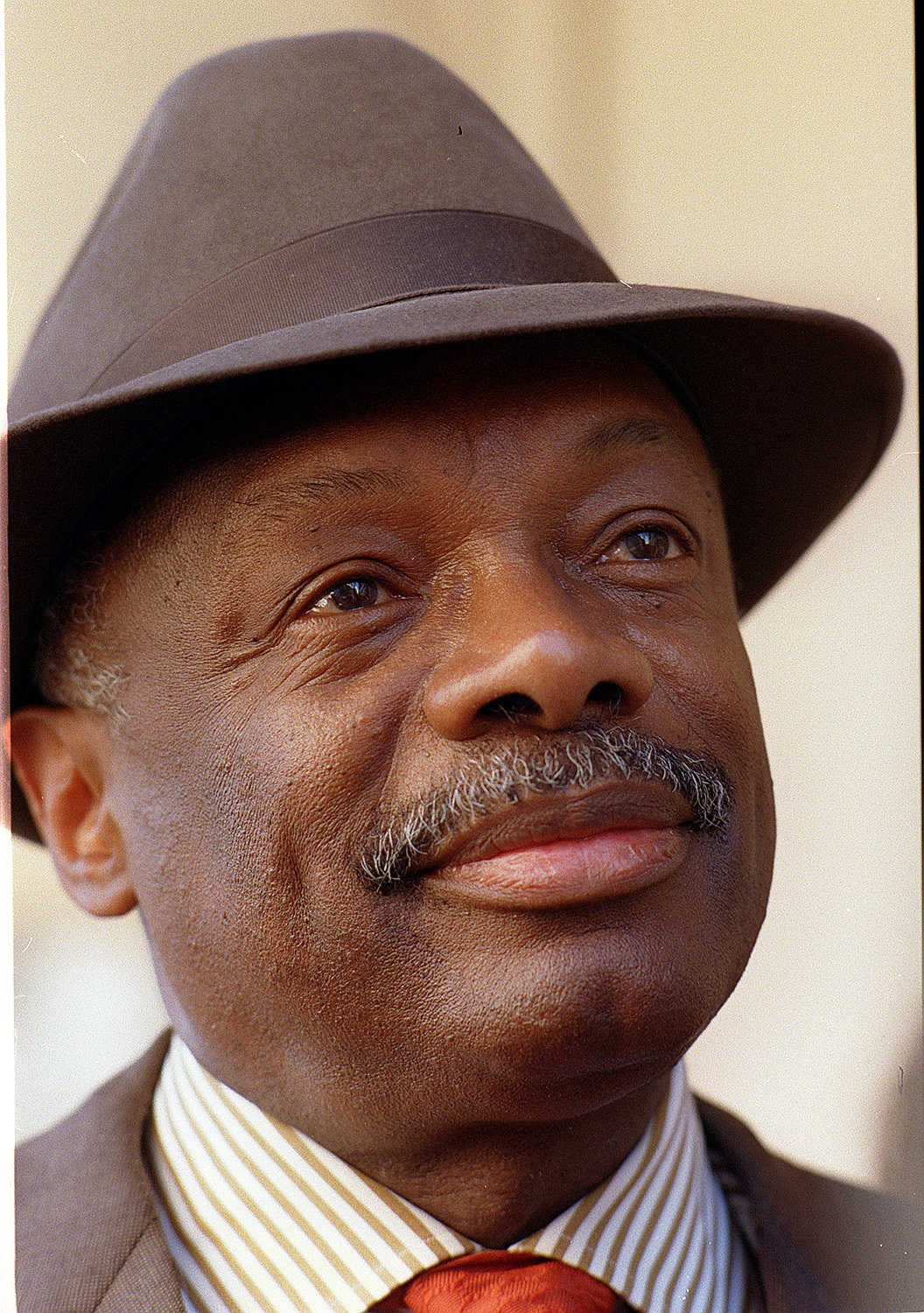
Brown sporting one of his many hats.

Willie Brown is an American politician who served as the mayor of San Francisco from 1996 to 2004. Brown also served in the California State Assembly from 1965 to 1995. During his tenure in the Assembly, Brown served as Speaker of the Assembly from 1980 to 1995, which is the longest tenure as Speaker. He was the first African American to serve in the position of both the mayor of San Francisco and Speaker of the California State Assembly. Brown retired from politics after the end of his mayoral term in 2004.

== California State Assembly ==
1964 California State Assembly 18th district election
Primary election
Party	Candidate	Votes	%
Democratic	Willie Brown	14,308	54.05
Democratic	Edward M. Gaffney (incumbent)	11,463	43.30
Democratic	James A. Chisholm	700	2.64
Total votes		26,471	100.00
General election
Democratic	Willie Brown	32,886	59.07
Republican	Russell E. Teasdale	22,789	40.93
Total votes		55,675	100.00
Democratic hold			

1966 California State Assembly 18th district election
Party	Candidate	Votes	%
Democratic	Willie Brown (incumbent)	30,444	55.64
Republican	Julius Kahn III	24,272	44.36
Total votes		54,716	100.00
Democratic hold			

1968 California State Assembly 18th district election
Party	Candidate	Votes	%
Democratic	Willie Brown (incumbent)	38,681	64.80
Republican	James L. Walker	17,091	28.63
Peace and Freedom	Kathleen N. Cleaver	2,778	4.65
American Independent	Dallas F. Givens	1,145	1.92
Total votes		59,695	100.00
Democratic hold			

1970 California State Assembly 18th district election
Party	Candidate	Votes	%
Democratic	Willie Brown (incumbent)	32,446	66.74
Republican	Frank J. Pagliaro, Jr.	16,167	33.26
Total votes		48,163	100.00
Democratic hold			

1972 California State Assembly 18th district election
Party	Candidate	Votes	%
Democratic	Willie Brown (incumbent)	47,645	76.07
Republican	Joan L. Irwin	14,989	23.93
Total votes		62,634	100.00
Democratic hold			

1974 California State Assembly 17th district election
Party	Candidate	Votes	%
Democratic	Willie Brown (incumbent)	44,847	65.47
Republican	Alexander "Al" Graf	23,655	34.53
Total votes		68,502	100.00
Democratic hold			

1976 California State Assembly 17th district election
Party	Candidate	Votes	%
Democratic	Willie Brown (incumbent)	51,083	67.70
Republican	Joan Kukari	21,921	29.05
Peace and Freedom	Leslie Anne Simpson	2,457	3.26
Total votes		75,461	100.00
Democratic hold			

1978 California State Assembly 17th district election
Party	Candidate	Votes	%
Democratic	Willie Brown (incumbent)	43,732	62.95
Republican	Mike Henderson	25,738	37.05
Total votes		69,470	100.00
Democratic hold			

1980 California State Assembly 17th district election
Party	Candidate	Votes	%
Democratic	Willie Brown (incumbent)	53,008	60.86
Republican	Thomas S. Crary	27,056	31.06
Libertarian	Marshall E. Schwartz	4,422	5.08
Peace and Freedom	Paul Kangas	2,612	3.00
Total votes		87,098	100.00
Democratic hold			

1982 California State Assembly 17th district election
Party	Candidate	Votes	%
Democratic	Willie Brown (incumbent)	70,320	66.84
Republican	Thomas S. Crary	27,848	26.47
Libertarian	Bonnie Hoy	4,073	3.87
Peace and Freedom	Michael G. Zaharakis	2,961	2.82
Total votes		105,202	100.00
Democratic hold			

1984 California State Assembly 17th district election
Party	Candidate	Votes	%
Democratic	Willie Brown (incumbent)	93,417	70.07
Republican	Lee S. Dolson, Jr.	39,898	29.93
Total votes		133,315	100.00
Democratic hold			

1986 California State Assembly 17th district election
Party	Candidate	Votes	%
Democratic	Willie Brown (incumbent)	71,829	70.59
Republican	Jeff Corino	25,069	24.64
Libertarian	Bonnie Hoy	4,852	4.77
Total votes		101,750	100.00
Democratic hold			

1988 California State Assembly 17th district election
Party	Candidate	Votes	%
Democratic	Willie Brown (incumbent)	79,091	69.95
Republican	Curt Augustine	28,159	24.90
Peace and Freedom	Shoshana Towers	5,826	5.15
Total votes		113,076	100.00
Democratic hold			

1990 California State Assembly 17th district election
Primary election
Party	Candidate	Votes	%
Democratic	Willie Brown (incumbent)	37,762	100.00
Total votes		37,762	100.00
General election
Democratic	Willie Brown (incumbent)	62,951	64.19
Republican	Terence Faulkner	26,572	27.10
Libertarian	John Whisman	8,537	8.71
Total votes		98,060	100.00
Democratic hold			

1992 California State Assembly 13th district election
Primary election
Party	Candidate	Votes	%
Democratic	Willie Brown (incumbent)	48,205	81.09
Democratic	Ellis Leonard Anthony Keyes	11,242	18.91
Total votes		59,447	100.00
General election
Democratic	Willie Brown (incumbent)	103,799	69.47
Republican	John Sidline	28,253	18.91
Peace and Freedom	Walter Medina	12,042	8.06
Libertarian	Mark Valverde	5,318	3.56
No party	George Mehrabian (write-in)	5	0.00
Total votes		149,417	100.00
Democratic hold			

1994 California State Assembly 13th district election
Primary election
Party	Candidate	Votes	%
Democratic	Willie Brown (incumbent)	29,023	100.00
Total votes		29,023	100.00
General election
Democratic	Willie Brown (incumbent)	80,158	72.95
Republican	Mare Wolin	21,488	19.56
Libertarian	Mark Read Pickens	8,233	7.49
Total votes		109,879	100.00
Democratic hold			

== California State Assembly Speaker ==
1980 California State Assembly Speaker election
Party	Candidate	Votes	%
Democratic	Willie Brown	51	68.00
Democratic	Howard Berman	24	32.00
Total votes		75	100.00

1982 California State Assembly Speaker election
Party	Candidate	Votes	%
Democratic	Willie Brown (incumbent)	48	60.00
Republican	Robert W. Naylor	32	40.00
Total votes		80	100.00

1988 California State Assembly Speaker election
Party	Candidate	Votes	%
Democratic	Willie Brown (incumbent)	40	51.28
Democratic	Charles Calderon	35	44.87
Republican	Ross Johnson	3	3.87
Total votes		78	100.00

1990 California State Assembly Speaker election
Party	Candidate	Votes	%
Democratic	Willie Brown (incumbent)	48	60.00
Republican	Ross Johnson	32	40.00
Total votes		80	100.00

1992 California State Assembly Speaker election
Party	Candidate	Votes	%
Democratic	Willie Brown (incumbent)	47	59.49
No party	Rejected	32	40.51
Total votes		79	100.00

1995 California State Assembly Speaker election
Party	Candidate	Votes	%
Democratic	Willie Brown (incumbent)	40	50.63
Republican	Jim Brulte	39	49.37
Total votes		79	100.00

== San Francisco Mayor ==
1995 San Francisco mayoral election
Primary election
Candidate	Votes	%
Willie Brown	72,955	34.71
Frank Jordan (incumbent)	70,764	33.66
Roberta Achtenberg	56,538	26.90
Ben Hom	6,355	3.02
Angela Alioto	1,386	0.66
Joel Ventresca	1,279	0.61
Dan Larkosh	732	0.35
Ellis L. A. Keyes	195	0.09
Total votes	210,204	100.00
Runoff election
Willie Brown	107,500	56.68
Frank Jordan (incumbent)	82,173	43.32
Total votes	189,673	100.00

1999 San Francisco mayoral election
Primary election
Candidate	Votes	%
Willie Brown (incumbent)	75,732	38.90
Tom Ammiano (write-in)	49,384	25.37
Frank Jordan	32,893	16.90
Clint Reilly	24,322	12.49
Martin Lee Eng	2,232	1.15
Lucrecia Bermudez	1,709	0.88
Cesar Ascarrunz	1,578	0.81
Jim Reid	1,502	0.77
Joel Ventresca	1,379	0.71
David J. Martz	949	0.49
Mark "Superbooty" O'Hara	919	0.47
A. D. Wyatt Norton	765	0.39
Max Wood	511	0.26
William Felzer	494	0.25
J. R. Manuel	277	0.14
Steve Shyte (write-in)	8	0.00
Larry J. Edmund (write-in)	7	0.00
Anatole Ghio (write-in)	4	0.00
Total votes	192,675	100.00
Runoff election
Willie Brown (incumbent)	131,983	59.61
Tom Ammiano	89,428	40.39
Total votes	221,411	100.00
