= 1991 San Francisco mayoral election =

- November 5, 1991 (first round); December 10, 1991 (runoff)
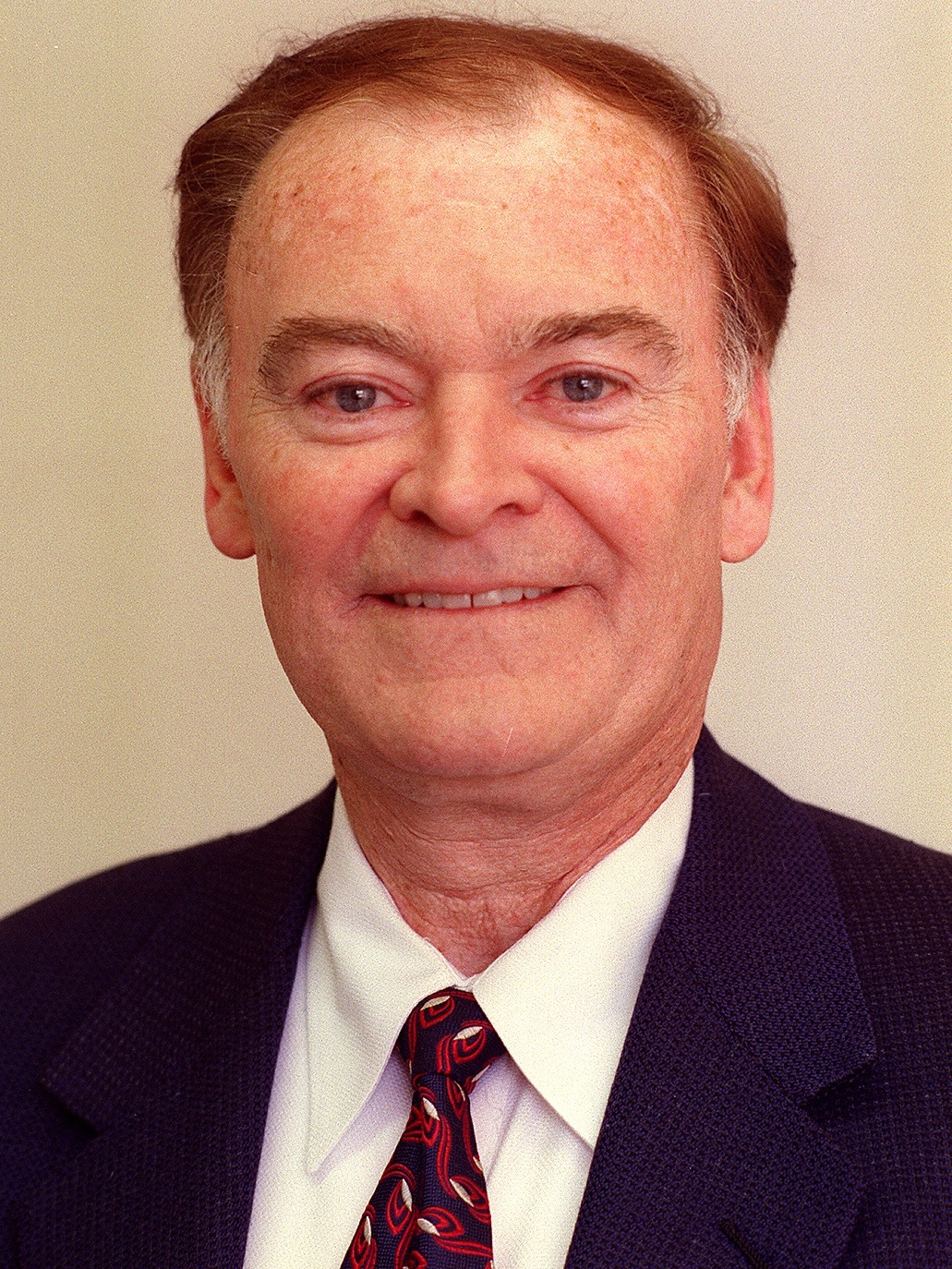

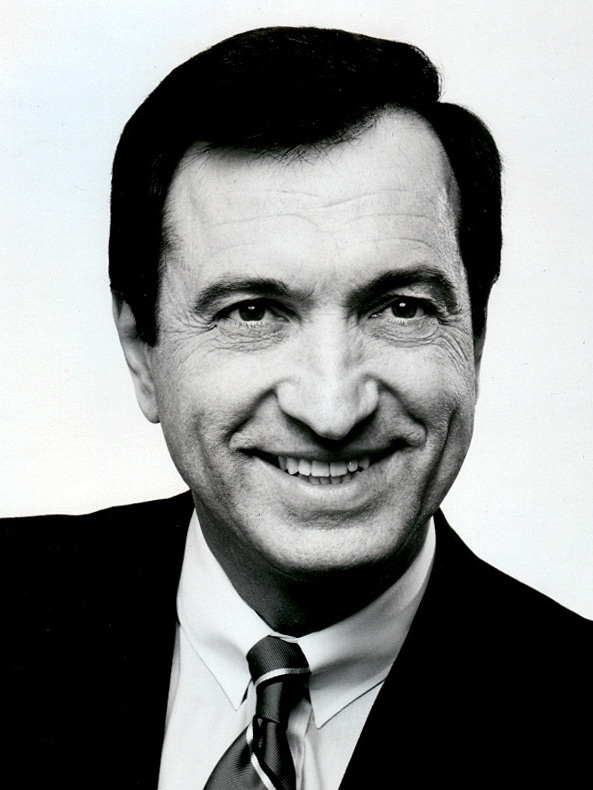

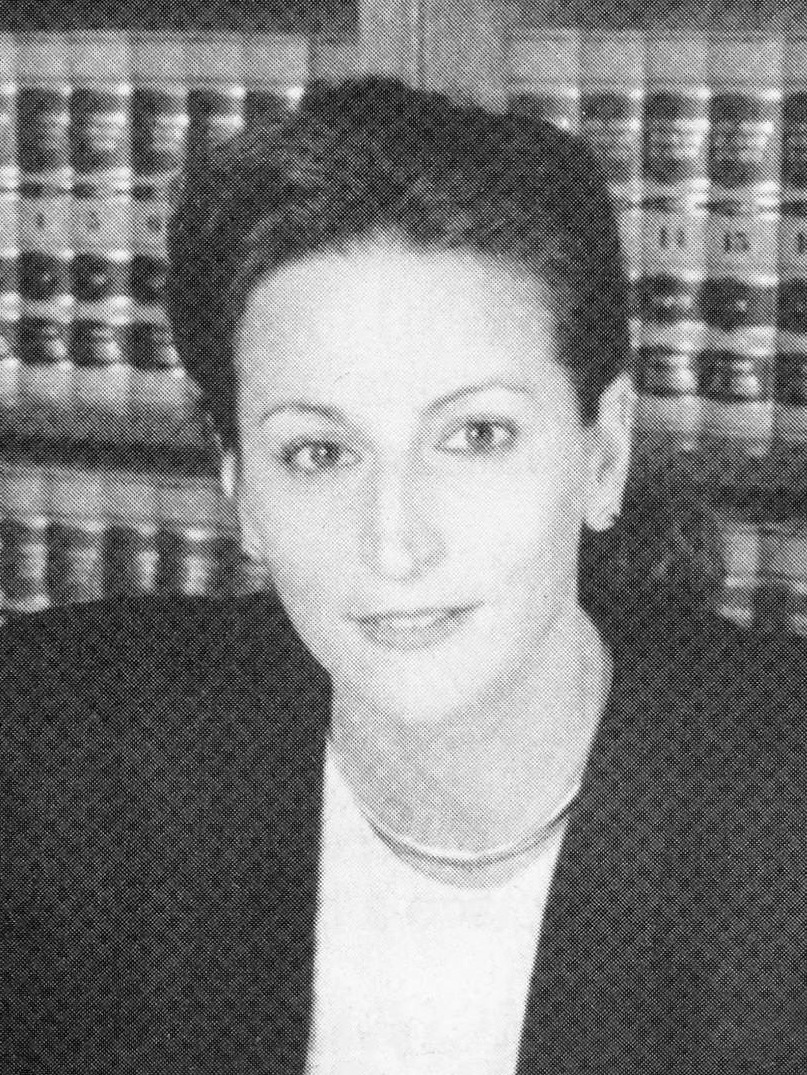

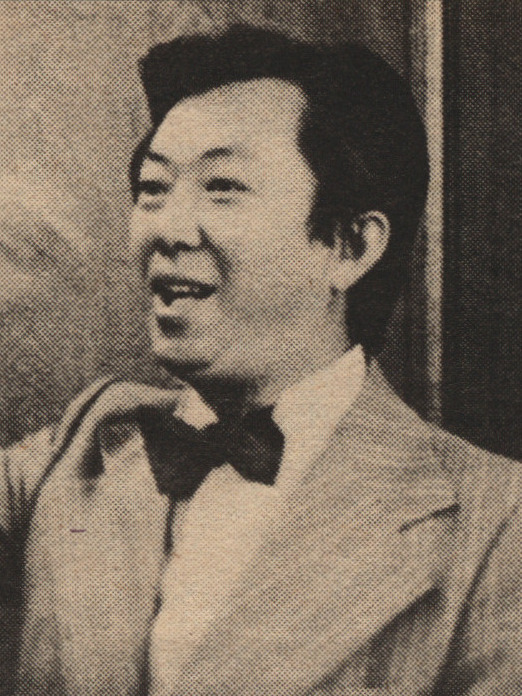

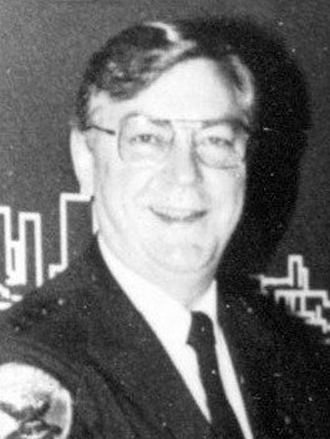
Candidate	Frank Jordan	Art Agnos	Angela Alioto
First round	59,928; 31.88%	51,714; 27.51%	34,910; 18.57%
Runoff	98,491; 52.01%	90,875; 47.99%	Eliminted
Candidate	Tom Hsieh	Richard Hongisto
First round	18,241; 9.70%	17,663; 9.40%
Runoff	Eliminted	Eliminted
Mayor before election
Art Agnos
Elected mayor
Frank Jordan

The 1991 San Francisco mayoral election was held on November 5, 1991, with a runoff election on December 10 that year. Incumbent mayor Art Agnos, after having won nearly 70% of the vote in 1987, scraped by with less than a third of the vote in the first round and was narrowly unseated by Chief of Police Frank Jordan in the runoff.

Agnos' strong support of demolishing the Embarcadero Freeway after the 1989 Loma Prieta earthquake caused San Francisco's Chinatown voters to turn against him, contributing to his narrow loss.

== Results ==
=== First round ===
November 5, 1991
Candidate	Votes	%
Frank Jordan	59,928	31.88%
Art Agnos (incumbent)	51,714	27.51%
Angela Alioto	34,910	18.57%
Tom Hsieh	18,241	9.70%
Richard Hongisto	17,663	9.40%
Gloria La Riva	2,552	1.36%
Joni Jacobs	1,397	0.74%
Cesar Ascarrunz	724	0.39%
Ellis Keyes	337	0.18%
Dehnert C. Queen	310	0.17%
Peter Planteen	214	0.11%
Total votes:		187,990
Voter turnout:		47.61%

=== Runoff ===
December 10, 1991
Candidate	Votes	%
Frank Jordan	98,491	52.01%
Art Agnos (incumbent)	90,875	47.99%
Total votes:		189,366
Voter turnout:		50.73%
