= Tom Hsieh =

San Francisco supervisor from 1986 to 1997

Thomas K. S. Hsieh
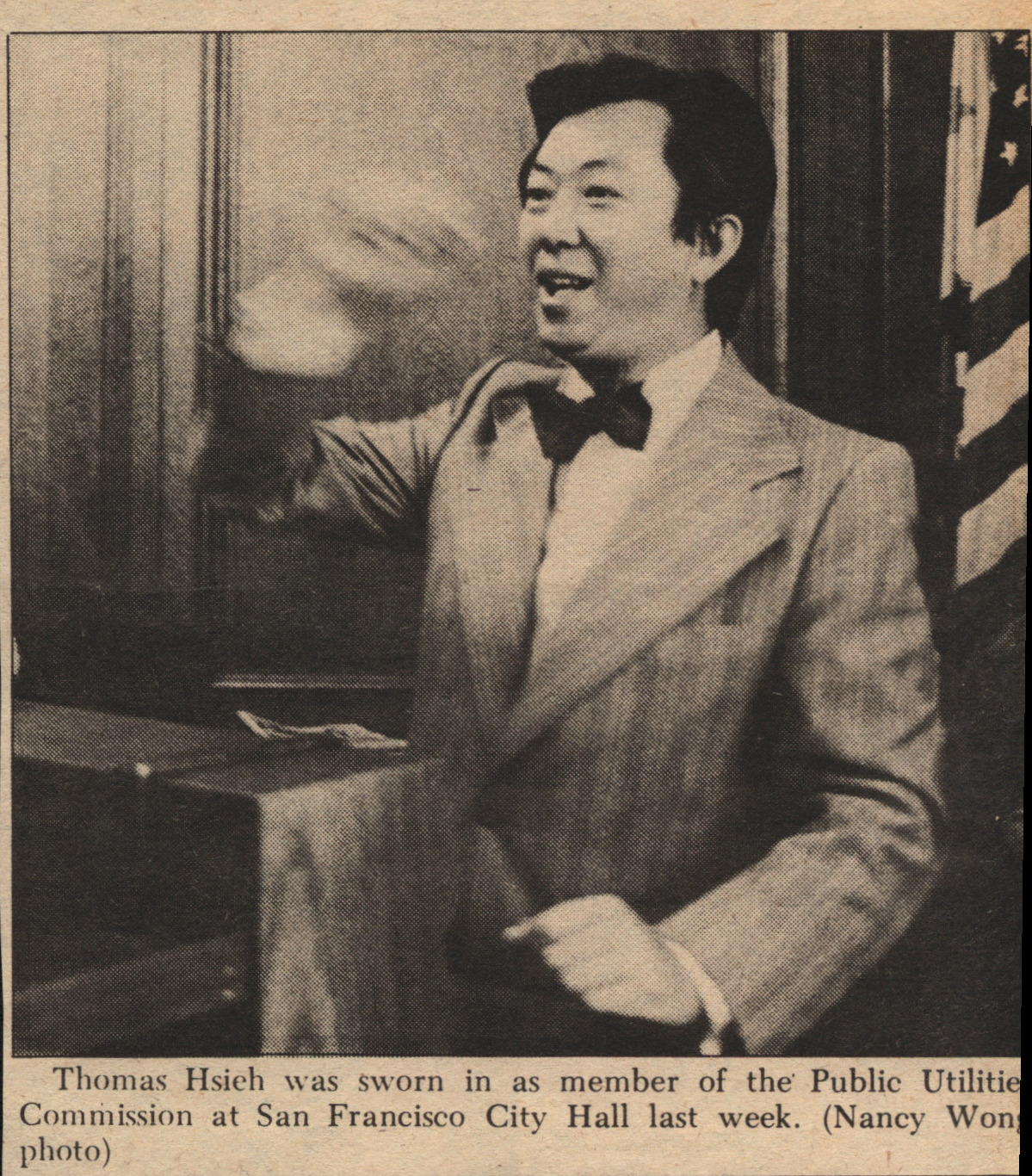

Member of the San Francisco Board of Supervisors from the at-large district
- In office September 5, 1986 – January 8, 1997

Personal details
- Born: November 17, 1931 Beijing, China
- Died: March 5, 2023 (aged 91) San Francisco, California, U.S.
- Children: 3
- Education: San Francisco City College, UC Berkeley (M.Arch)
- Occupation: Architect; Politician

Thomas Kuo Shyang Hsieh (November 17, 1931 – March 5, 2023) was a Chinese-born American politician, architect, and vineyard owner. He was San Francisco's third supervisor of Asian ancestry when he was appointed to the San Francisco Board of Supervisors in 1986. He was the first Chinese American to be elected to a citywide office in San Francisco. He was re-elected twice and termed out of office in 1997.

Hsieh was previously also the first Chinese American San Francisco Arts Commissioner and San Francisco Police Commissioner. He also served as a San Francisco Public Utilities Commissioner.

== Early life and education ==
Hsieh was born in Beijing on November 17, 1931, and immigrated to the United States aged 19 in 1951.

Hsieh attended City College of San Francisco. He received his Master of Architecture from University of California, Berkeley.

As an architect Hsieh designed and built over 1,600 low to moderate income units of housing for the elderly.

== Political career ==
Hsieh was appointed and elected to various San Francisco, California State and Federal civic commissions as the first Chinese American in the 1970s and 80's and was active in raising money for the State and National Democratic Party. He created the Asian Pacific Caucus of the Democratic National Committee and served there from 1978 to 1986. He was previously appointed the first Chinese American to the San Francisco Arts Commission by Mayor Joseph Alioto. He served as the first Chinese American commissioner on the San Francisco Police Commission and was a commissioner on the San Francisco Public Utilities Commission from 1980 to 1984 appointed by Mayor Dianne Feinstein.

Hsieh filed papers and campaigned to run for San Francisco Supervisor in 1985, using the slogan "Say Shay" Tom Hsieh for Supervisor.

Hsieh was appointed to fill a vacancy to the San Francisco Board of Supervisors in 1986 by Mayor Dianne Feinstein. He was the first Chinese American supervisor to be elected in a citywide election in 1986. Hsieh was a member of the Budget and Economic Vitality and Social Policy committees.

Hsieh was a member of the Metropolitan Transportation Commission and was in support of creating a commuter rail line on the San Francisco–Oakland Bay Bridge.

Hsieh ran for Mayor of San Francisco in the 1991 election as a pro-business fiscal conservative against Mayor Art Agnos. He placed fourth with around 10% of the vote.

Hsieh termed out in 1996, exiting the office in January 1997. He was seen as a potential candidate for City Treasurer in the 1997 election but declined to run.

== Personal life ==
Hsieh married Jeannette Fay in 1959. Hsieh resided in Nob Hill, San Francisco. He received a heart bypass in 1995. Hsieh has three sons.

Hsieh and his wife purchased a partnership in a Napa Valley vineyard in 1972.

Hsieh and philanthropist Rosalyn Koo were family friends. Koo has served as treasurer for his election campaigns.

Hsieh died at UCSF Hospital in San Francisco, on March 5, 2023, at the age of 91.
