= Divas Nightclub & Bar =

Former longtime transgender club in San Francisco

Coordinates: 37.78673°N 122.41953°W

Divas Nightclub & Bar was a San Francisco nightclub located at 1081 Post Street in the Polk Gulch neighborhood of San Francisco, California, where it was located since 1998, prior to closing. With three floors, the club catered predominately to trans women and their admirers, until it closed on March 30, 2019. Prior to its location at 1081 Post Street, Divas had opened in 1989 across the street at the corner of Post and Larkin, under the name Motherload.

== History ==
In 1989 Joseph Jurkans and Mark Gilpin opened the Motherlode at 1002 Post Street (corner of Post and Larkin) in San Francisco. The Motherlode was the predecessor of Divas. In 1998 Mark Gilpin (Joseph Jurkans having by that time died) moved the establishment across the street, less than a block away, to 1081 Post Street. Both the Motherlode and subsequently Divas received sustained prolonged community opposition from people and entities, including: The First Apostolic Church, community organizations Save Our Streets and the Polk Street District Merchants’ Association, and Mayor (and former police chief) Frank Jordan. Organizers made various claims, including that the club brought prostitution, illicit drug use, and noise problems to the neighborhood.

Steve Berkey would eventually take over ownership of the club (and the building at 1081 Post Street).

Before closing its doors on March 30, 2019, Divas was the only transgender club in California, and one of three in the country. It served as a metaphorical town square for the San Francisco transgender community, being an important gathering space and performance venue.

== In popular culture ==
Divas was the subject of a book of portraits, entitled "Divas of San Francisco: Portraits of Transsexual Women," by David Steinberg (published February 1, 2008)

Divas is repeatedly referenced in the book, "The Auto-Obituary of Joy Grrl Syn: Nymph of Darkness," by Magdelyn C. Bordeaux (February 2023).

Divas is described in depth in Joseph Plaster's book "The Kids on the Street."
