= 1987 San Francisco mayoral election =

- November 3, 1987 (first round); December 8, 1987 (runoff)
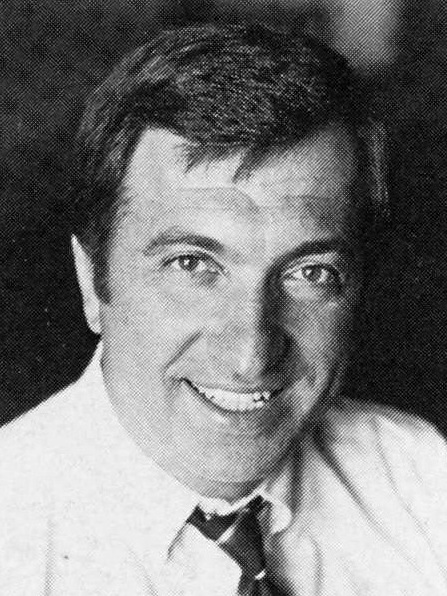

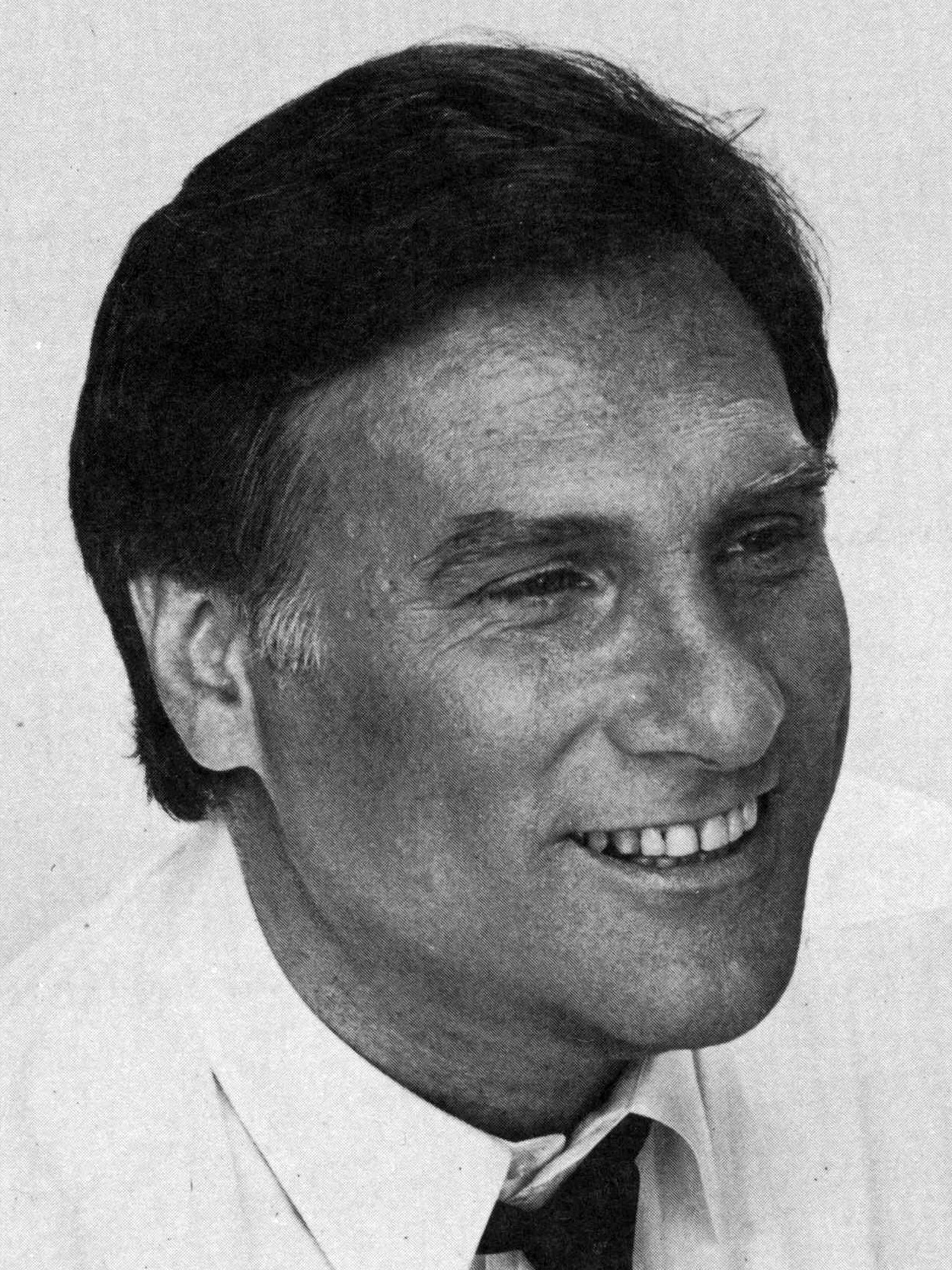

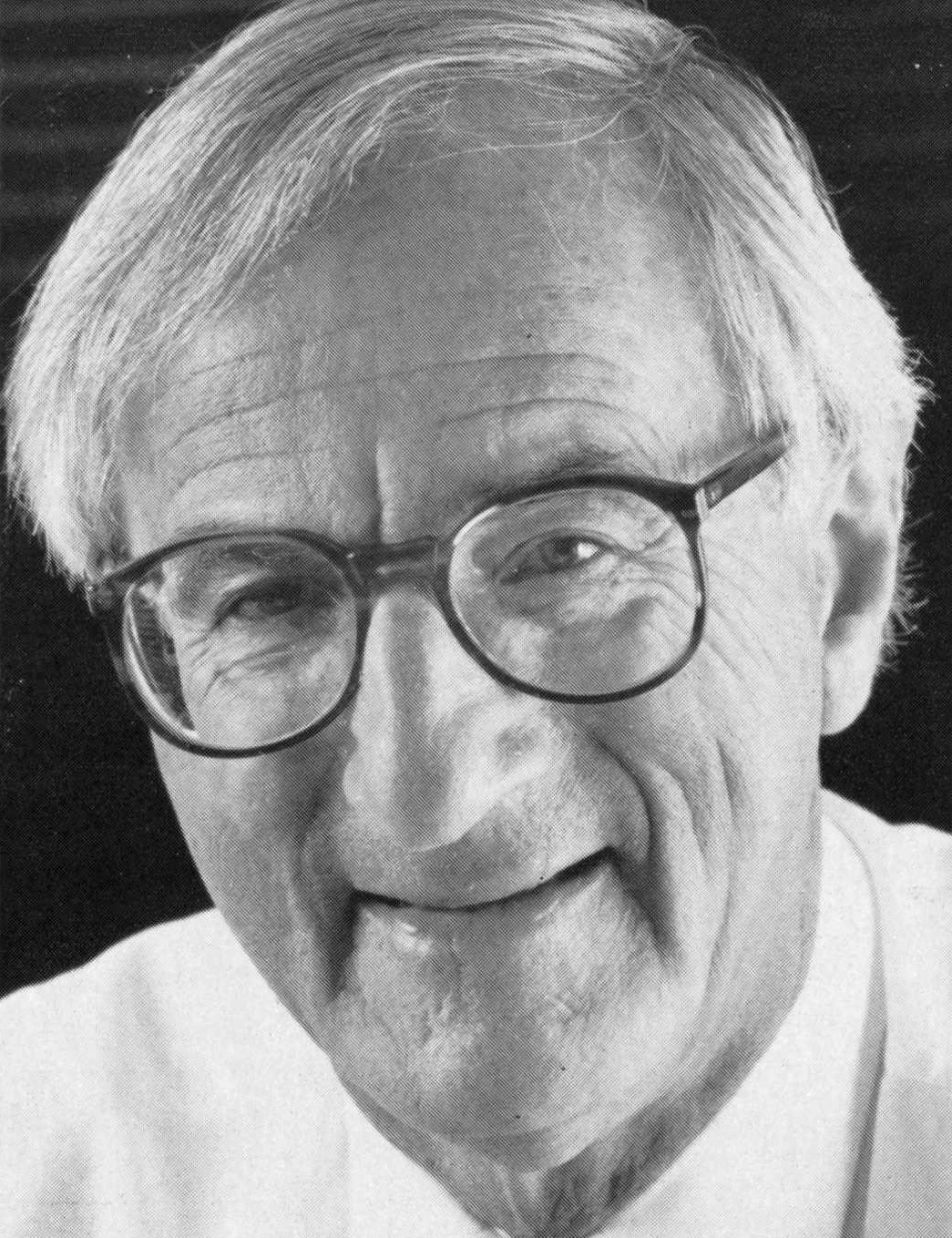
Candidate	Art Agnos	John L. Molinari	Roger Boas
First round	90,521; 48.16%	46,747; 24.87%	40,892; 21.26%
Runoff	102,898; 69.92%	44,275; 30.08%	Eliminated
Mayor before election
Dianne Feinstein
Elected mayor
Art Agnos

An election was held on November 3 and December 8, 1987, to elect the 39th mayor of San Francisco. Dianne Feinstein, then the incumbent, had served as mayor since the 1978 assassination of mayor George Moscone and supervisor Harvey Milk and had been elected to full terms in 1979 and 1983, and was thus term-limited. Then-California State Assembly member Art Agnos came from behind to defeat Supervisor John Molinari, garnering nearly 70 percent of the vote.

== Background ==
Agnos was seen as the more liberal candidate whereas Molinari was the more conservative option.

San Francisco City Attorney Louise Renne ran a mayoral campaign but dropped out before the election.

== Endorsements ==
Agnos was endorsed by the San Francisco Police Officers Association.

Molinari was endorsed by Supervisor Carole Migden.

== Results ==
=== First round ===
November 3, 1987
Party	Candidate	Votes	%
Democratic	Art Agnos	90,521	48.16%
Democratic	John L. Molinari	46,747	24.87%
Nonpartisan	Roger Boas	40,892	21.76%
Nonpartisan	Warren Hinckle	5,202	2.77%
Nonpartisan	Cesar Ascarrunz	1,483	0.79%
Nonpartisan	Will Durst	1,445	0.77%
Nonpartisan	Melissa Ehman	557	0.30%
Nonpartisan	Peter Anestos	498	0.27%
Nonpartisan	Joseph Ryan	370	0.20%
Nonpartisan	Scott D. Redmond	255	0.14%
Total votes:			193,742
Voter turnout:			51.1%

=== Runoff ===
December 8, 1987
Party	Candidate	Votes	%
Democratic	Art Agnos	102,898	69.92%
Democratic	John L. Molinari	44,275	30.08%
Total Votes:			153,720
Voter Turnout:			40.3%
