= Willie Brown (politician) =

American politician (born 1934)

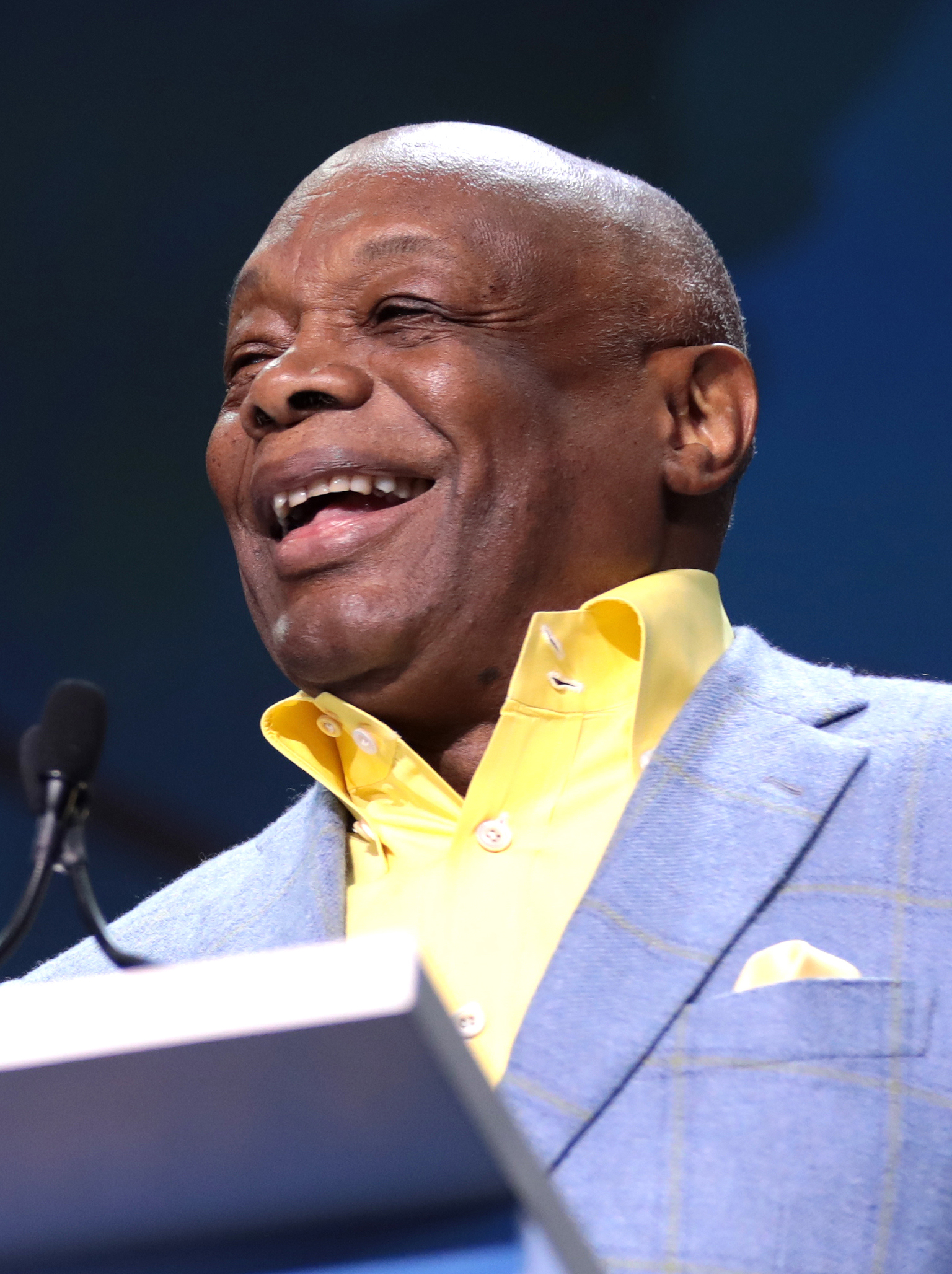
- Brown in 2019

41st Mayor of San Francisco
- In office January 8, 1996 – January 8, 2004
- Preceded by: Frank Jordan
- Succeeded by: Gavin Newsom

Minority Leader of the California Assembly
- In office June 5, 1995 – September 14, 1995
- Preceded by: Jim Brulte
- Succeeded by: Richard Katz

58th Speaker of the California State Assembly
- In office December 2, 1980 – June 5, 1995
- Preceded by: Leo McCarthy
- Succeeded by: Doris Allen

Member of the California State Assembly
- In office January 4, 1965 – December 14, 1995
- Preceded by: Edward M. Gaffney
- Succeeded by: Carole Migden
- Constituency: 18th district (1965–1974); 17th district (1974–1992); 13th district (1992–1995)

Personal details
- Born: Willie Lewis Brown Jr. March 20, 1934 (age 92) Mineola, Texas, U.S.
- Party: Democratic
- Spouse: Blanche Vitero (m. 1958; sep. 1981)
- Children: 4
- Education: San Francisco State University (BA); University of California, Hastings (JD)

Military service
- Allegiance: United States
- Branch/service: United States Army; California Army National Guard
- Years of service: 1955–1958
- Unit: 126th Medical Battalion

Willie Lewis Brown Jr. (born March 20, 1934) is an American politician and attorney. A member of the Democratic Party, he served as mayor of San Francisco from 1996 to 2004, the first African American to hold the office.

Born in Mineola, Texas, where he graduated from high school, Brown moved to San Francisco in 1951. He graduated from San Francisco State University in 1955 and earned a J.D. from the University of California, Hastings College of the Law in 1958, after which he began his career as an attorney and was involved in the civil rights movement. He was elected to the California Assembly in 1964, gaining popularity in San Francisco as one of the country's most powerful state legislators. As a legislator, Brown earned a reputation as a supporter of civil rights of gays and lesbians, and was able to manage colleagues and maintain party discipline. He served as the speaker of the California State Assembly from 1980 to 1995. His long tenure and powerful position was a focal point of the California ballot proposition limiting the terms of state legislators that passed in 1990. During the last of his three allowed post-initiative terms, Brown maintained control of the Assembly despite a slim Republican majority. Near the end of his final term, he decided to run for mayor of San Francisco.

During Brown's tenure as mayor of San Francisco, the city's budget was expanded, and real estate development, public works, city beautification, and other city projects saw a significant increase. Brown presided over the "dot-com" era at a time when San Francisco's economy was rapidly expanding. His administration included more Asian-Americans, women, Latinos, gays and African Americans than the administrations of his predecessors. Brown was reelected in 1999. Term limits prevented him from running for a third term, and he was succeeded by his political protégé Gavin Newsom. San Francisco Chronicle called Brown "one of San Francisco's most notable mayors", adding that he had "celebrity beyond the city's boundaries." He retired from politics after leaving the office in 2004, published an autobiography, and continued to fundraise and advise politicians.

== Early life, education, and early career ==
Brown was born on March 20, 1934, in Mineola, a small segregated town in East Texas marked by racial tensions, to Minnie Collins Boyd and Lewis Brown. He was the fourth of five children. During Brown's childhood, mob violence periodically erupted in Mineola, keeping African-Americans from voting. His first job was as a shoeshine boy in a whites-only barber shop. He later worked as a janitor, fry cook and field hand. He learned his strong work ethic at a young age from his grandmother. He graduated from Mineola Colored High School, which he later described as substandard, and left for San Francisco in August 1951 at the age of 17 to live with his uncle.

Although Brown did not meet the qualifications for San Francisco State College, a professor at the school facilitated his admission on probation. Brown adjusted to college studies by working especially hard to catch up in his first semester. He joined the Young Democrats and became friends with John L. Burton. Brown originally wanted to be a math instructor but campus politics changed his ambitions. He became active in his church and the San Francisco NAACP. Brown worked as a doorman, janitor and shoe salesman to pay for college. He is a member of Alpha Phi Alpha fraternity. He also joined the Reserve Officers' Training Corps (ROTC) but later quit the ROTC and joined the California Army National Guard's 126th Medical Battalion, where he was trained as a dental hygienist. Brown earned a bachelor's degree in political science from San Francisco State in 1955.

Brown attended University of California, Hastings College of the Law, where he also worked as a janitor. He later said that his decision to attend law school was primarily to avoid being drafted. He befriended future San Francisco mayor George Moscone, for whom Brown later managed a campaign.

During the late 1950s and early 1960s, Brown was one of a few African-Americans practicing law in San Francisco when he opened his own business. He practiced criminal defense law, representing pimps, prostitutes and other clients that more prominent attorneys would not represent. One early case was to defend Mario Savio on his first civil disobedience arrest. He quickly became involved in the Civil Rights Movement, leading a well-orchestrated sit-in to protest housing discrimination after a local real estate office refused to work with him because of his race.

Brown began his first run for the California State Assembly in 1962 by having local African American ministers pass around a hat, collecting $700. He lost the election by 600 votes before winning a second election in 1964.

== California State Assembly ==
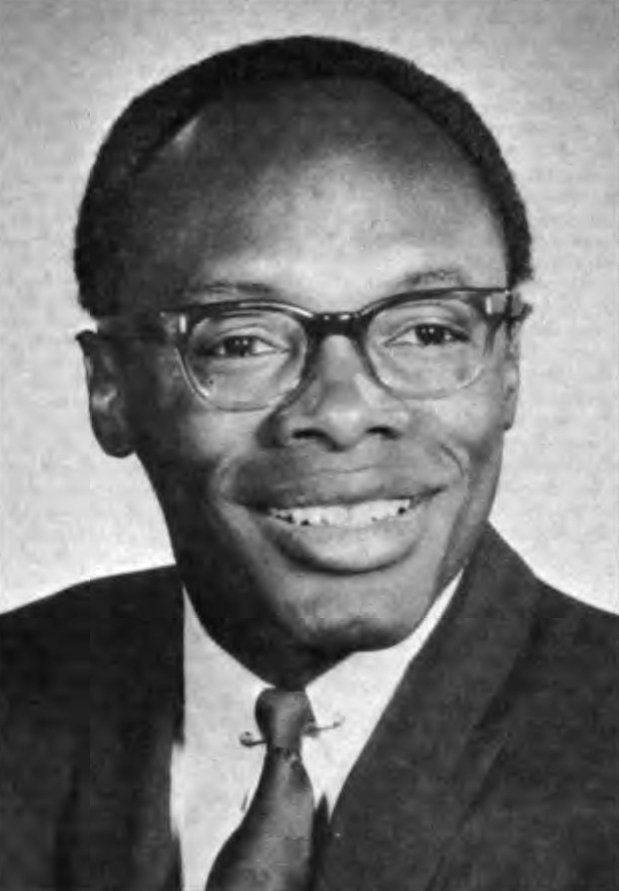
Brown's official State Assembly portrait, 1967

Brown was one of four Black Americans in the Assembly in 1965. The other three were Mervyn M. Dymally, F. Douglas Ferrell and Byron Rumford. He continued to be reelected to the Assembly until 1995. In the 1960s, Brown served as chair of the Legislative Representation Committee, a powerful position that helped him climb the Assembly ranks. He became the Democrats' Assembly whip in 1969. Brown also served on the Assembly Ways and Means Committee. In 1972, he delivered a speech at the Democratic National Convention. He lost his bid for the speakership in 1972. In 1975, Brown authored and lobbied the successful passing of the Consenting Adult Sex Bill that legalized homosexuality in California, thus earning the strong and lasting support of San Francisco's gay community. Similarly, he voted against AB 607, which banned same-sex marriage in 1977, further building his reputation as a supporter of the civil rights of gays and lesbians. During the 1970s, Brown continued to expand his legal practice, including the representation of several major real estate developers. He won the Speakership in 1980.

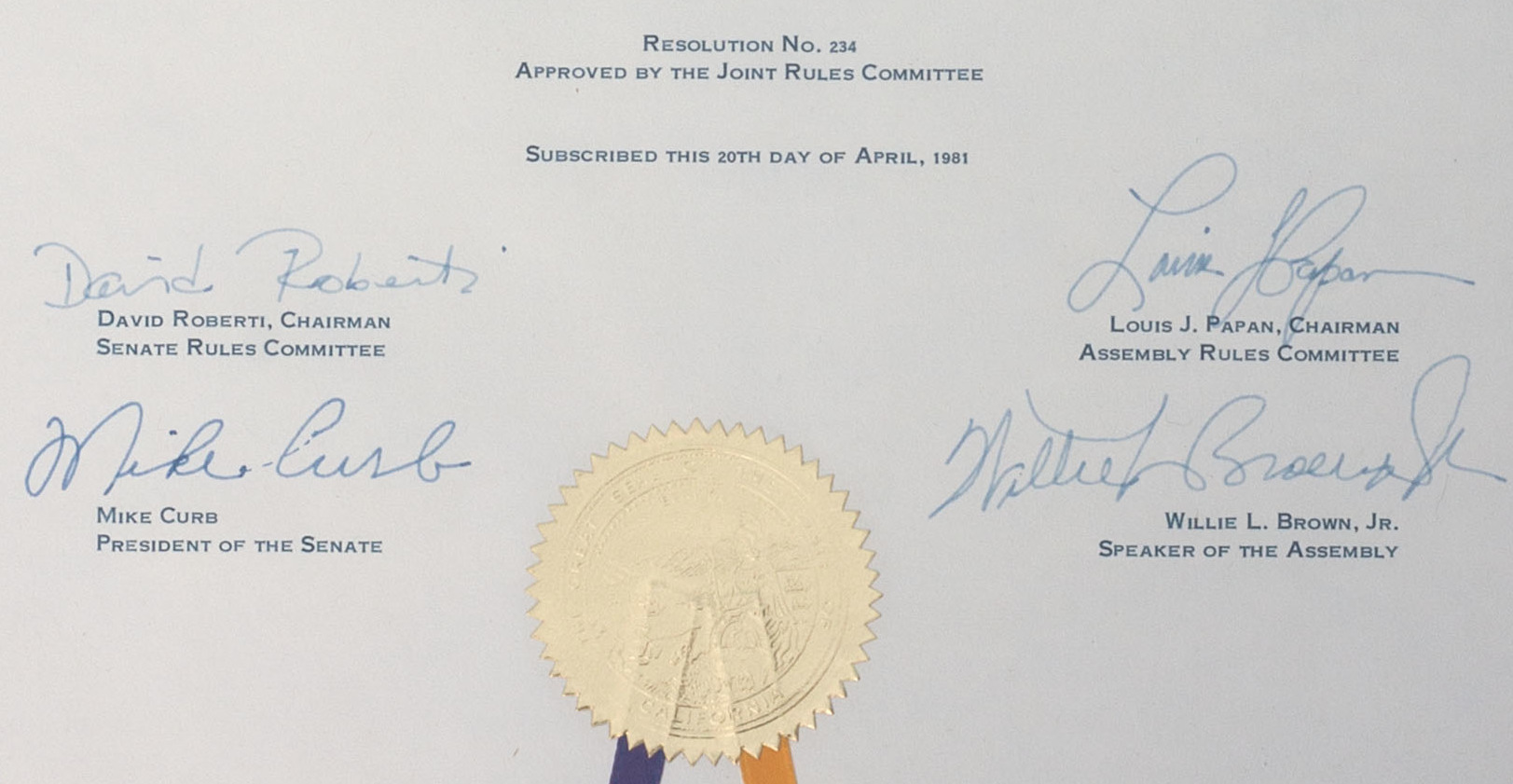
Signatures from a resolution signed by Brown in his role of Speaker of the California State Assembly

Brown was California's first Black American speaker of the Assembly, and served in the office from 1981 to 1995. In 1990, he helped negotiate an end to a 64-day budget standoff. In 1994, Brown gained the vote of a few Republicans to maintain the Speakership when the Democrats lost control of the Assembly to the Republicans led by Jim Brulte. Brown regained control in 1995 by making a deal with Republican defectors Doris Allen and Brian Setencich, both of whom were elected speaker by the Democratic minority.

Brown's long service in the Assembly and political connections, his strong negotiation skills, and the Assembly's tenure system for leadership appointments combined to give Brown nearly complete control over the California legislature by the time he became Assembly Speaker. According to The New York Times, Brown became one of the country's most powerful state legislators. He nicknamed himself the "Ayatollah of the Assembly".

Brown was extremely popular in San Francisco, but less so in the rest of the state. Nevertheless, he wielded great control over statewide legislative affairs and political appointments, making it difficult for his conservative opponents to thwart his power. Partially to remove Brown from his leadership position, a state constitutional amendment initiative was proposed and passed by the electorate in 1990, imposing term limits on state legislators. Brown became the focus of the initiative, and raised just under $1 million to defeat it. The California legislature challenged the law, but the courts upheld it. California Proposition 140 also cut the legislature's staff budget by 30 percent, causing Brown to reduce legislative staff by at least 600. Under current California term-limits law, no speaker of the California State Assembly is able to have a longer tenure than Brown's.

Brown gained a reputation for knowing what was occurring in the state legislature at all times. In 1992, he gave $1.18 million to the Democratic Party to help with voter registration and several campaigns, some of which was from contributions from tobacco companies and insurance companies. As Speaker, he worked to defeat the Three Strikes Law. Critics have claimed Brown did not do enough to raise the legislature's ethical standards or to protect the environment. During his time in Sacramento, he estimates he raised close to $75 million to help elect and reelect state Democrats.

Brown led efforts in the Assembly for state universities to divest from South Africa and to increase AIDS research funding. He helped obtain state funds for San Francisco, including funding for public health and mental health funds. Brown held up the 1992 state budget for 63 days until Governor Pete Wilson added another $1.1 billion for public schools.

Brown had a reputation in the Assembly for his ability to manage people. Republican State Senator Ken Maddy of Fresno noted Brown's ability to "size up the situation and create, sometimes on the spot, a winning strategy." According to Hobson, "He was a brilliant daycare operator. ... He knew exactly how to hold the hand of his Assembly members. He dominated California politics like no other politician in the history of the state".

=== Peoples Temple ===
From 1975 to 1978, Brown supported the Peoples Temple, led by Jim Jones, while it was being investigated for alleged criminal wrongdoing. Brown attended the Temple perhaps a dozen times and served as master of ceremonies at a testimonial dinner for Jones where he said in his introduction, "[l]et me present to you a combination of Martin King, Angela Davis, Albert Einstein ... Chairman Mao."

== Mayor of San Francisco ==
In 1995, Brown ran for mayor of San Francisco. In his announcement speech, he said San Francisco needed a "resurrection" and that he would bring the "risk-taking leadership" the city needed. Brown placed first in the first round of voting, but because no candidate received 50% of the vote, he faced incumbent Frank Jordan in the December runoff. Brown gained the support of Supervisor Roberta Achtenberg, who had placed third in the first round of voting. He campaigned on working to address poverty and problems with Muni. He called Jordan the "inept bumbler" and criticized his leadership. Jordan criticized Brown for his relations with special interests during his time in the State Assembly. Brown easily defeated Jordan.

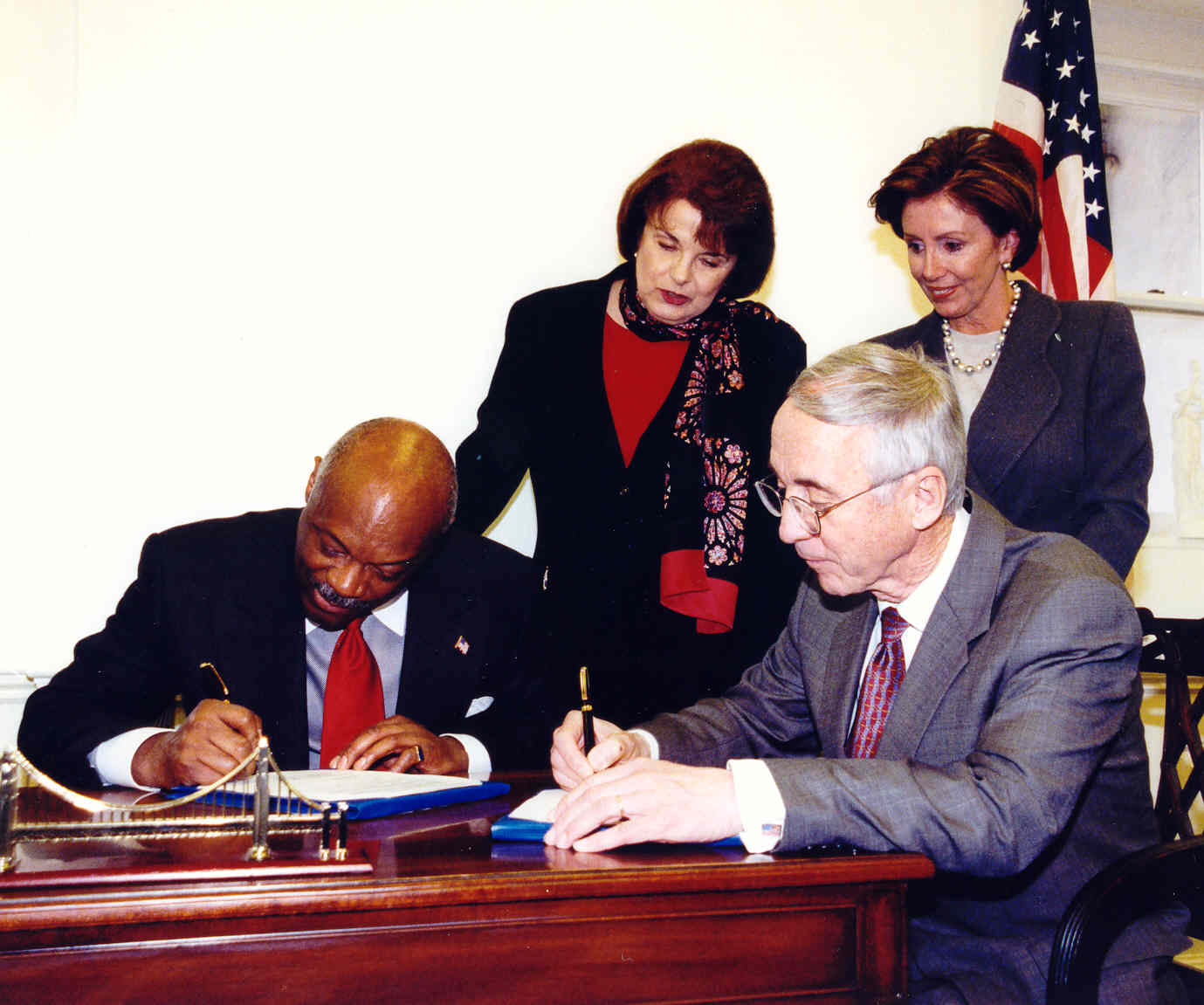
Mayor Brown signing legislation in 2002, flanked by Dianne Feinstein, Nancy Pelosi, and Gordon England

Brown's inaugural celebration included an open invitation party with 10,000 attendees and local restaurants providing 10,000 meals to the homeless. President Bill Clinton called Brown to congratulate him, and the congratulations were broadcast to the crowd. He delivered his inaugural address without notes and led the orchestra in "The Stars and Stripes Forever". He arrived at the event in a horse-drawn carriage.

In 1996, more than two-thirds of San Franciscans approved of Brown's job performance. As mayor, he made several appearances on national talk shows. Brown called for expansions to the San Francisco budget to provide for new employees and programs. In 1999, he proposed hiring 1,392 new city workers and proposed a second straight budget with a $100 million surplus. He helped oversee the settling of a two-day garbage strike in April 1997. During Brown's tenure, San Francisco's budget increased to $5.2 billion and the city added 4,000 new employees. Brown tried to develop a plan for universal health care, but there wasn't enough in the budget to do so. He put in long days as mayor, scheduling days of solid meetings and, at times, conducting two meetings at the same time. Brown opened City Hall on Saturdays to answer questions. He would later claim of his mayorship that he helped restore the city's spirit and pride.

Brown's opponents in his 1999 mayoral reelection campaign were former mayor Jordan and Clint Reilly. They criticized Brown for spending the city's $1 billion in budget growth without addressing its major problems and creating an environment of corruption and patronage at City Hall. Tom Ammiano was a late write-in candidate and faced Brown in the runoff election. Brown won reelection by a 20-point margin. Most major developers and business interests supported him. Ammiano campaigned on a promise that he would raise the hourly minimum wage to $11 and scrutinize corporate business taxes. Brown repeatedly claimed that Ammiano would raise taxes. President Clinton recorded a telephone message on Brown's behalf. Brown's campaign spent $3.1 million to Ammiano's $300,000. The 1999 mayoral race was the subject of the documentary See How They Run.

=== Crime and public safety ===
According to Brown, although he was scheduled for a flight to New York City on the day of the September 11, 2001 attacks, he received a "low key warning" in a phone call from a member of his airport security detail, who advised him not to fly. Brown disregarded the warning and was waiting for a ride to the airport for an 8 a.m. Pacific Time flight, when he learned of the attacks. He immediately ordered the city to close schools and courts, concerned over the potential for additional terrorist attacks. In addition, he recommended to representatives of other possible targets in San Francisco, including the Bank of America Tower and Transamerica Pyramid, that they also close.

In February 2003, Brown's appointed police chief, Earl Sanders, and several top San Francisco Police Department officials were arrested for conspiring to obstruct the police investigation into an incident involving off-duty officers popularly called "Fajitagate".

=== Social policy ===
Brown ended San Francisco's policy of punishing people for feeding the homeless. San Francisco continued to enforce its policy regarding the conduct of the homeless in public places. In 1998, Brown supported forcibly removing homeless people from Golden Gate Park and police crackdowns on the homeless for drunkenness, urinating, defecating, or sleeping on the sidewalk. Brown introduced job training programs and a $11 million drug treatment program. San Francisco, the country's 13th-largest city at the time, had the nation's third-largest homeless population, at a peak of 16,000. In November 1997, Brown requested nighttime helicopter searches in Golden Gate Park. His administration spent hundreds of millions of dollars creating new shelters, supportive housing, and drug treatment centers to address homelessness, but these measures did not end homelessness.

In 1996, Brown approved the Equal Benefits Ordinance, which required city contractors to give their employees domestic partner benefits. In 1998, he wrote President Clinton a letter urging him to halt a federal lawsuit aimed at closing medical marijuana clubs.

=== Transportation ===
==== Mass transit ====
One of Brown's central campaign promises was his "100-Day Plan for Muni", in which he said he would fix the city's municipal bus system in that many days. Brown supported the "Peer Pressure" Bus Patrol program, which paid former gang members and troubled youth to patrol Muni buses. He claimed the program helped reduce crime. He fired Muni chief Phil Adams and replaced him with his chief of staff Emilio Cruz. In 1998, Brown was mayor during the summer of the Muni meltdown as Muni implemented the new ATC system and he promised riders there would be better times ahead. A voter-approved initiative the next year helped improve Muni services. Brown increased Muni's budget by tens of millions of dollars over his tenure. He later said he made a mistake in overpromising with his 100-Day Plan.

Brown helped mediate a settlement to the 1997 BART strike.

During his first term as mayor, Brown quietly favored the demolition and abolition of the Transbay Terminal to accommodate the redevelopment of the site for market-rate housing. Centrally located at First and Mission Streets near the Financial District and South Beach, the terminal originally served as the San Francisco terminus for the electric commuter trains of the East Bay Electric Lines, the Key System of streetcars and the Sacramento Northern railroads which ran on the lower deck of the San Francisco–Oakland Bay Bridge. Since the termination of streetcar service in 1958, the terminal had seen continuous service as a major bus facility for East Bay commuters; AC Transit buses transport riders from the terminal directly into neighborhoods throughout the inner East Bay. The terminal also served passengers traveling to San Mateo County and the North Bay aboard SamTrans and Golden Gate Transit buses respectively, and tourists arriving by bus motorcoach. The Transbay Terminal ultimately was replaced by the Salesforce Transit Center, as the land was used to construct Salesforce Tower.

==== Critical Mass ====
Since 1992, cyclists riding in San Francisco's monthly Critical Mass bicycle rides had used the "corking" technique at street intersections to block rush-hour cross-traffic. In 1997, Brown approved San Francisco Police Department Chief Fred Lau's plan to crack down on the rides, calling them "a terrible demonstration of intolerance" and "an incredible display of arrogance." After arrests were made when a Critical Mass event became violent, Brown said, "I think we ought to confiscate their bicycles" and "a little jail time" would teach Critical Mass riders a lesson. On the night of the July 25, 1997, ride, 115 riders were arrested for unlawful assembly, jailed, and had their bicycles confiscated.

By 2002, Brown and the city's relations with Critical Mass had changed. On the 10th anniversary of Critical Mass on September 27, 2002, the city officially closed down four blocks to automobile traffic for the annual Car-Free Day Street Fair. Brown said of the event, "I'm delighted. A new tradition has been born in our city."

=== Urban planning and development ===
As mayor, Brown was criticized for aggregating power and favoring certain business interests at the city's expense as a whole. Supporters point to the many development projects completed or planned under his watch, including the restoration of City Hall and historic waterfront buildings; the setting in motion of one of the city's largest ever mixed-use development projects in Mission Bay, and the development of a second campus for the University of California, San Francisco. In contrast, critics objected to the construction of many live-work loft buildings in formerly working-class neighborhoods that they believed led to gentrification and displacement of residents and light industry.

Under Brown, City Hall was restored from damages sustained during the 1989 Loma Prieta earthquake. He insisted on restoring the light courts and having the dome gilded with more than $400,000 in real gold. The Embarcadero was redeveloped and the Mission Bay Development project began. Brown also oversaw the approval of the Catellus Development Corp., a $100 million restoration of the century-old Ferry Building, the new Asian Art Museum, the new M. H. de Young Memorial Museum, the expansion of the Moscone Convention Center and San Francisco International Airport's new international terminal. Brown worked to restructure the Housing Authority. He helped established an AFL-CIO housing trust to build affordable housing and worked to increase the city's share of federal and state grants. He oversaw declining crime rates and improvements in the city's economy, finances, and credit ratings during his first term.

Brown was known for his shrewd and strategic use of the planning process's details to affect and facilitate development projects on his watch. In regard to a parking garage on Vallejo Street desired by North Beach and Chinatown merchants, he circumvented neighborhood opponents of the garage by ordering demolition of the site's existing structure to commence on a Friday night and be done by Monday morning, when the group was certain to try to obtain a restraining order. "It was with the demolition permit I outsmarted them", Brown said, claiming that as the critics rushed toward court, "someone shouted out to them that the building had disappeared over the weekend. They've never recovered from that little maneuver."

During his mayoralty, Brown hoped to build a new stadium for the San Francisco 49ers and worked with them to create a plan. No new facility was built for the team during his tenure. Brown worked with the San Francisco Giants to build a new stadium in the China Basin after previous stadium measures had failed on the ballot. The stadium was approved by San Francisco voters in June 1997 and opened in 2000.

Due to vacancies on the Board of Supervisors before 2000, Brown was able to appoint eight of the board's 11 members. Due to a change in San Francisco's election laws that took effect in 2000, the board changed from at-large to district-based elections, and all seats on the board were up for election. The voters elected a new group of supervisors that ran on changing the city's development policy. Voters also passed a measure that weakened the mayor's control over the Planning Commission and Board of Appeals. The new majority limited Brown's power over the Elections Department, the Police Commission, and extending San Francisco International Airport's runways into the bay to reduce flight delays.

== Favoritism, patronage criticisms, and FBI investigations ==
Allegations of political patronage followed Brown from the state legislature through his mayoralty. Former Los Angeles County GOP assemblyman Paul Horcher, who voted in 1994 to keep Brown as speaker, was reassigned to a position with a six-figure salary as head of San Francisco's solid waste management program. Brian Setencich was also appointed to a position by Brown. Both were hired as special assistants after losing their Assembly seats because they supported Brown. Former San Francisco supervisor Bill Maher was also hired as a special assistant after campaigning for Brown in his first mayoral race. Brown is also accused of favoritism to Carolyn Carpeneti, a philanthropic fundraiser with whom he had a child. In 1998 Brown arranged for Carpeneti to obtain a rent-free office in the city-owned Bill Graham Civic Auditorium. Between then and 2003, a period that included the birth of their daughter, Carpeneti was paid an estimated $2.33 million by nonprofit groups and political committees, though not all this money went directly to Carpeneti.

Brown increased the city's special assistants payroll from $15.6 to $45.6 million between 1995 and 2001. Between April 29, and May 3, 2001, San Francisco Chronicle reporters Lance Williams and Chuck Finnie released a five-part story on Brown and his relations with city contractors, lobbyists, and city appointments and hires he had made during his mayoralty. The report concluded that there was an appearance of favoritism and conflicts of interest in the awarding of city contracts and development deals, a perception that large contracts had an undue influence on City Hall, and patronage with the hiring of campaign workers, contributors, legislative colleagues, and friends to government positions.

The Federal Bureau of Investigation investigated Brown when he was speaker. One investigation was a sting operation concerning a fake fish company attempting to bribe Brown; he was not charged with a crime. The FBI further investigated Brown from 1998 to 2003 over his appointees at the Airport Commission for potential conflicts of interests. Brown's friend, contributor, and former law client Charlie Walker was given a share of city contracts. Walker had previously thrown several parties for Brown and was among his biggest fundraisers. He had served jail time in 1984 for violating laws concerning minority contracting. The FBI investigated Walker. The FBI also investigated Brown's approval of expansion of Sutro Tower and SFO. Scott Company, with one prominent Brown backer, was accused of using a phony minority front company to secure an airport construction project. Robert Nurisso was sentenced to house arrest. During Brown's administration, there were two convictions of city officials tied to Brown. Brown reassigned Parking and Traffic chief Bill Maher to an airport job when his critics claimed Maher should have been fired. Brown also put his former girlfriend Wendy Linka on the city payroll.

Brown's romantic relationship with Alameda County deputy district attorney Kamala Harris preceded his appointment of Harris to two California state commissions in the mid-1990s. The San Francisco Chronicle called the Unemployment Insurance Appeals Board and the California Medical Assistance Commission patronage positions. When the appointments became a political issue in Harris's 2003 race for District Attorney, she responded: "Whether you agree or disagree with the system, I did the work". Brown's relationship with Harris gained renewed attention in early 2019 after she had become a U.S. senator and ran for president. Brown addressed the questions by publishing a piece in the San Francisco Chronicle titled "Sure, I dated Kamala Harris. So what?" He wrote that he may have "influenced" her career by appointing her to boards and supporting her run for District Attorney, but added that he had also influenced the careers of other politicians. Brown noted that the difference between Harris and other politicians he had helped was that "Harris is the only one who, after I helped her, sent word that I would be indicted if I 'so much as jaywalked' while she was D.A. That's politics for ya."

== After mayorship ==
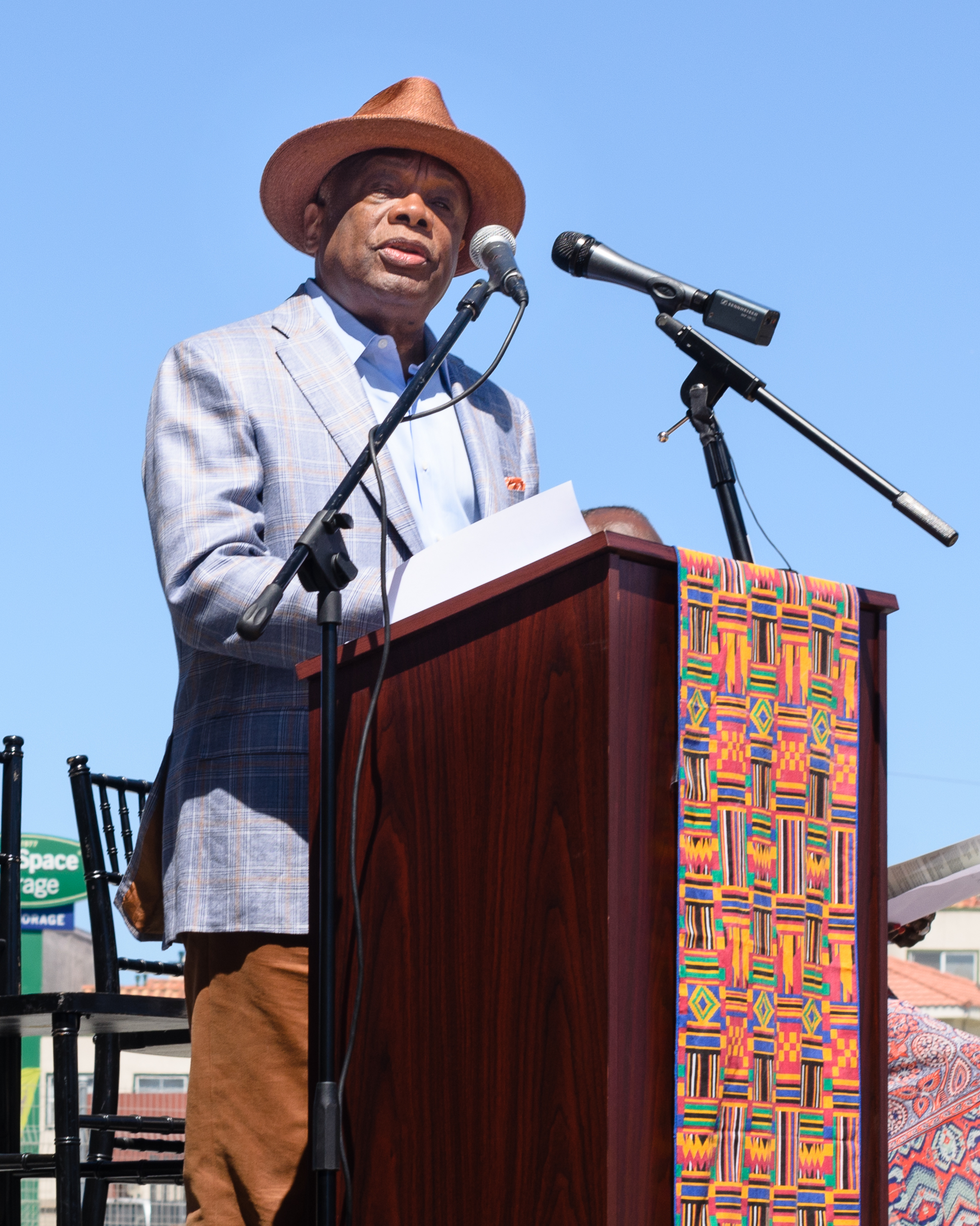
Brown speaking in 2016

After leaving the mayor's office, Brown considered running for the State Senate but ultimately declined. From January through September 2006, he hosted a morning radio show with comedian Will Durst on a local San Francisco Air America Radio affiliate. He also does a weekly podcast. Brown established The Willie L. Brown Jr. Institute on Politics & Public Service, an unaffiliated nonprofit organization at San Francisco State University. It trains students for careers in municipal, county and regional governments. The center will be one of the first to focus on local government in the country. Brown gave its library a collection of his artifacts, videotapes and legislative papers from his 40 years in public office. He is also planning to mentor students, teach a course on leadership, and recruit guest speakers.

On February 5, 2008, Simon & Schuster released Brown's hardcover autobiography, Basic Brown: My Life and Our Times, with collaborator P. J. Corkery. The book release coincided with California's Democratic presidential primary on the same day. On July 20, 2008, Brown began writing a column for the San Francisco Chronicle, a move that drew the ire of some Chronicle staff members and ethicists for the failure to disclose multiple conflicts of interest.

In 2009, Brown was defending general construction contractor Monica Ung of Alamo, California. Accused of flouting labor laws and defrauding immigrant construction workers of their wages from laboring on Oakland municipal construction projects, Ung was arraigned on dozens of felony fraud charges on August 24, 2009, in Alameda County Superior Court. Brown's decision to defend Ung angered many in the East Bay's labor community.

In September 2013, the western span of the Bay Bridge was officially named for Brown. In early 2015, he was named to the board of directors of the San Francisco-based biopharmaceutical company Global Blood Therapeutics.

Brown has often been associated with former California governor Arnold Schwarzenegger, who served for seven years after the end of Brown's mayoralty. In retirement, Brown continued to participate in fundraising for and advising other politicians.

=== Transportation company ===
In late 2012, Brown became the regulatory lawyer for Wingz, a ride-sharing service. In that capacity, he represented the company before the California Public Utilities Commission, which was creating new regulations to legalize the ability of transportation network companies to operate ridesharing services in California.

== In the media ==
As mayor, Brown was often portrayed mockingly but affectionately by political cartoonists and columnists as a vain emperor, presiding in a robe and crown over the kingdom of San Francisco. He enjoyed the attention this brought to his personal life, disarming friends and critics with humor that directed attention away from the policy agendas he was pursuing.

Brown's flamboyant style made him so well known as the consummate politician that when an actor playing a party politician in 1990's The Godfather Part III did not understand director Francis Ford Coppola's instruction to model his character after Brown, Coppola fired the actor and hired Brown himself to play the role. Brown later appeared in 2000's Just One Night as a judge. He also played himself in two Disney films, George of the Jungle and The Princess Diaries, and in the 2003 film Hulk as the mayor of San Francisco. He appeared as himself, alongside Geraldo Rivera, in an episode of Nash Bridges.

Brown was criticized in 1996 for his comments that 49ers backup quarterback Elvis Grbac was "an embarrassment to humankind." He was criticized in 1997 for responding to Golden State Warriors player Latrell Sprewell choking his coach P. J. Carlesimo by saying, "his boss may have needed choking."

In 1998, Brown contacted the Japanese television cooking competition Iron Chef, suggesting San Franciscan Chef Ron Siegel to battle one of the Iron Chefs. Brown appeared on the telecast himself.

Brown remained neutral in the 2008 presidential campaign. He has worked as a radio talk show host and a pundit on local and national political television shows and is seen as attempting to build credibility by abstaining from endorsing candidates for office. "I've never been high on endorsements," Brown said. "When you get one, all it does is keep the other guy from getting one. Really, what did getting John Kerry's endorsement do to help Barack Obama?"

== Personal life ==
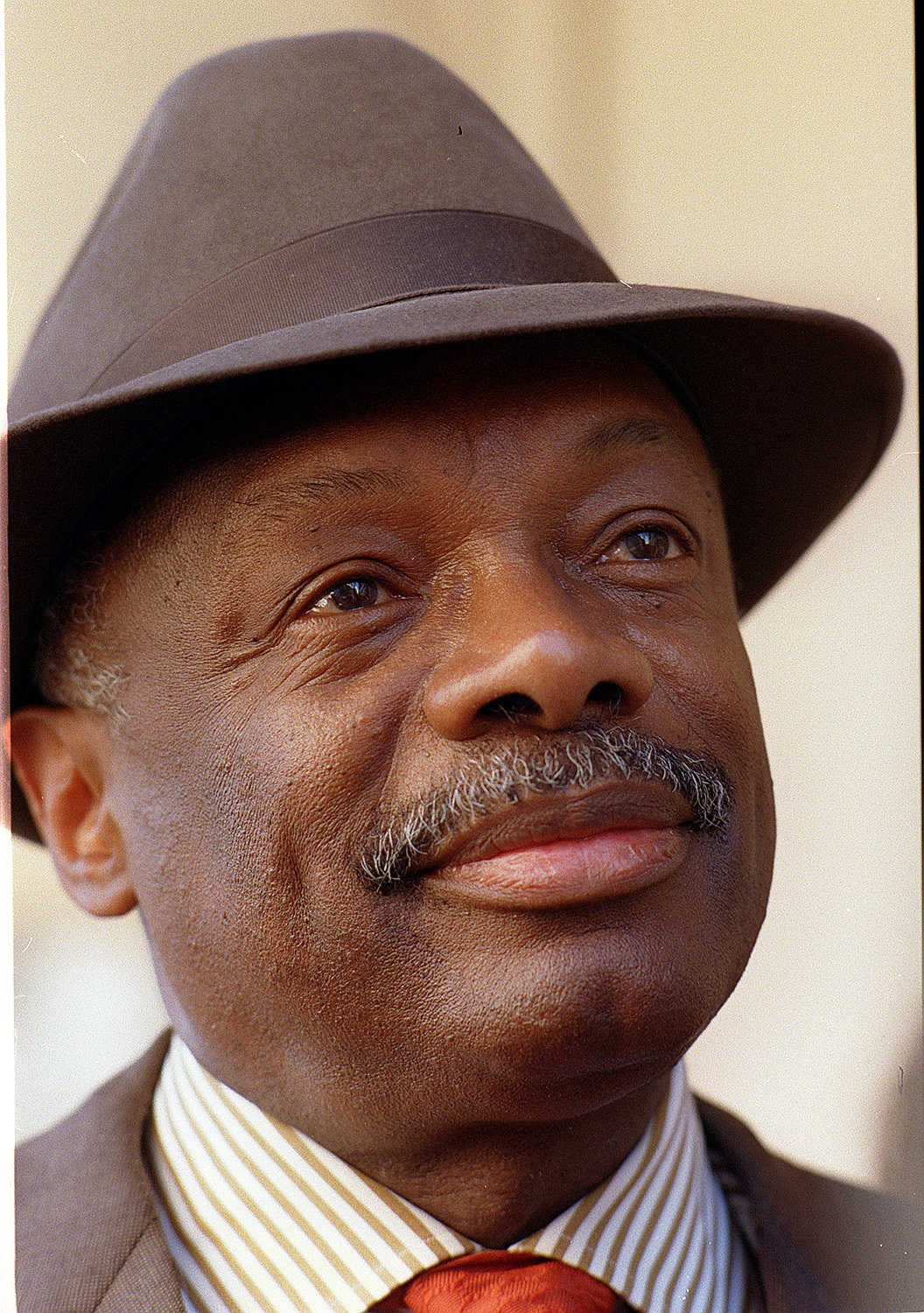
Brown sporting one of his many hats.

=== Family and relationships ===
In September 1958, Brown married Blanche Vitero, with whom he had three children. Brown and Vitero have been separated since 1981, but are not divorced. James Richardson, a reporter for The Sacramento Bee, said of Brown, "The measure of his flamboyance is he'll go to a party with his wife on one arm and his girlfriend on the other."

Brown shares three children with his wife Blanche: Susan Brown, Robin Brown, and Michael Brown, and also has a daughter, Sydney Brown, with philanthropic fundraiser Carolyn Carpeneti. He has four grandchildren (Besia Rose, Matea Friedel, Mateo Brown, and Lola Brown), a step-granddaughter (Tyler Santini), and one great-grandson (Robin Rose).

From 1994 to 1995, Brown dated Kamala Harris, who worked as an Alameda County deputy district attorney at the time. In 1994, Brown appointed Harris to two different commissions - the California Unemployment Insurance Appeals Board and the California Medical Assistance Commission. Their relationship gained renewed attention in early 2019 after she had become a U.S. senator and ran for president.

=== Retinitis pigmentosa ===
While serving as Assembly speaker, Brown was diagnosed with retinitis pigmentosa (RP), a disease that has no cure and would slowly destroy his eyesight. RP is a hereditary disease that causes a continual loss of peripheral vision and often leads to total blindness. Brown's two sisters were also diagnosed with RP. Brown remarked, "Having RP is a challenge. As Speaker of the Assembly it was very important that I recognize people in the halls of the legislature. But I couldn't see people unless they were right in front of me. I needed to have the security people give me notes to tell me who was in the room. Reading is also very difficult so I use larger print notes and memos. Living with RP means having to use more of your brain function—I listen more intently, I memorize vast amounts of information, and I have trained my computer to recognize numerous verbal commands."

=== Personal style ===
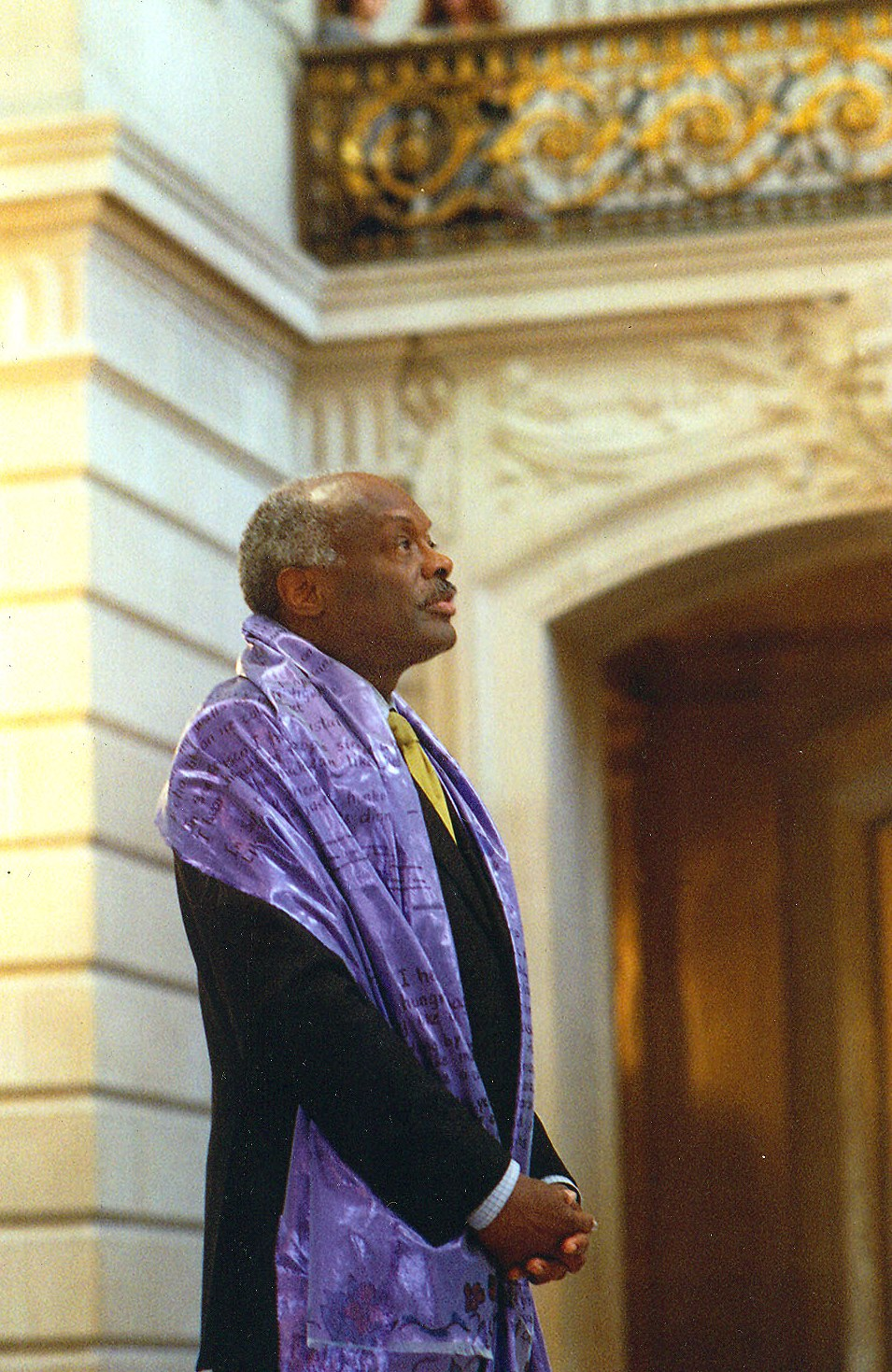
Mayor Willie Brown at an event in the San Francisco City Hall rotunda in the 1990s.

Brown has long expressed himself through personal style, which contributed to his visibility and was turned to political advantage. Even in high school he was fastidious about his appearance. In office, Brown became famous for British and Italian suits, sports cars, nightclubbing, and a collection of dressy hats. He was once called "The Best Dressed Man in San Francisco" by Esquire magazine.

In his 2008 autobiography Basic Brown, he described his taste for $6,000 Brioni suits and his search for the perfect chocolate Corvette. In one chapter, "The Power of Clothes: Don't Pull a Dukakis", Brown writes that men should have a navy blazer for each season: one with "a hint of green" for springtime, another with more autumnal threading for the fall. He adds, "You really shouldn't try to get through a public day wearing just one thing. ... Sometimes, I change clothes four times a day."

== Awards and honors ==
- 1990: Adam Clayton Powell Award of the Congressional Black Caucus
- 1996: Brown received the Golden Plate Award of the American Academy of Achievement
- 2014: Legacy Award of the National Newspaper Publishers Association
- 2018: Lifetime Achievement Award, Greater Los Angeles African American Chamber of Commerce
- 2018: NAACP's Spingarn Medal
- 2024: Inducted into the California Hall of Fame

== Filmography ==
- The Godfather Part III (1990)
- George of the Jungle (1997) as himself, Mayor of San Francisco
- Just One Night (2000)
- The Princess Diaries (2001) as himself, Mayor of San Francisco
- Hulk (2003)
- Pig Hunt (2008)
- America Is Still the Place (2015)
- I'm Charlie Walker (2021)

== Bibliography ==
- Brown Jr., Willie L.; Corkery, P. J. (2008). Basic Brown: My Life and Our Times (1st ed.). New York: Simon & Schuster. ISBN 978-0743290814. OCLC 892925831. OL 7948919M – via Internet Archive.
- Clucas, Richard A. (1994). The Speaker's Electoral Connection: Willie Brown and the California Assembly. Berkeley: University of California Press. ISBN 0877723613.
- Green, Robert Lee (1974). Willie L. Brown Jr: Daring Black Leader. Milwaukee: Franklin Publishers. OCLC 53358667.
- Holst, Arthur Matthew. "Brown, Willie." In African American National Biography vol. 2, edited by Henry Louis Gates Jr., and Evelyn Brooks Higginbotham. (Oxford University Press, 2008), pp. 12–13.
- Richardson, James (1993). Willie Brown: The Early Years. Washington D.C.: Alicia Patterson Foundation. OCLC 28525812.
- Richardson, James (1997). Willie Brown: A Biography. Berkeley: University of California Press. ISBN 0585249857.

California Assembly
Preceded by Edward M. Gaffney	Member of the California Assembly from the 18th district 1965–1974	Succeeded by Leo T. McCarthy
Preceded by John Miller	Member of the California Assembly from the 18th district 1974–1992	Succeeded by Dean Andal
Preceded by Barbara Lee	Member of the California Assembly from the 18th district 1992–1995	Succeeded by Carole Migden
Political offices
Preceded by Leo McCarthy	Speaker of the California Assembly; 1980–1995	Succeeded by Doris Allen
Preceded by Frank Jordan	Mayor of San Francisco; 1996–2004	Succeeded by Gavin Newsom
