= 1995 San Francisco mayoral election =

- November 7, 1995; December 12, 1995
- Turnout: 51.86% (first-round); 45.52% ▼6.34 pp (runoff)
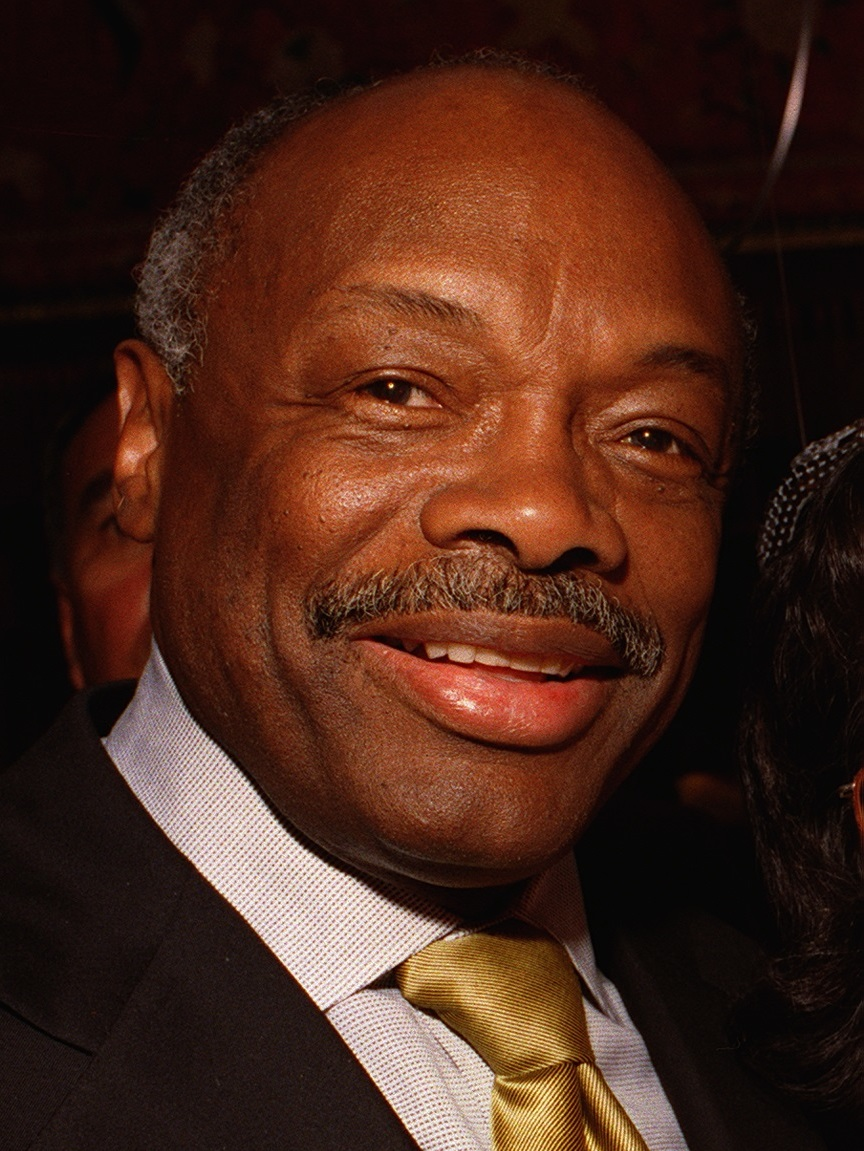

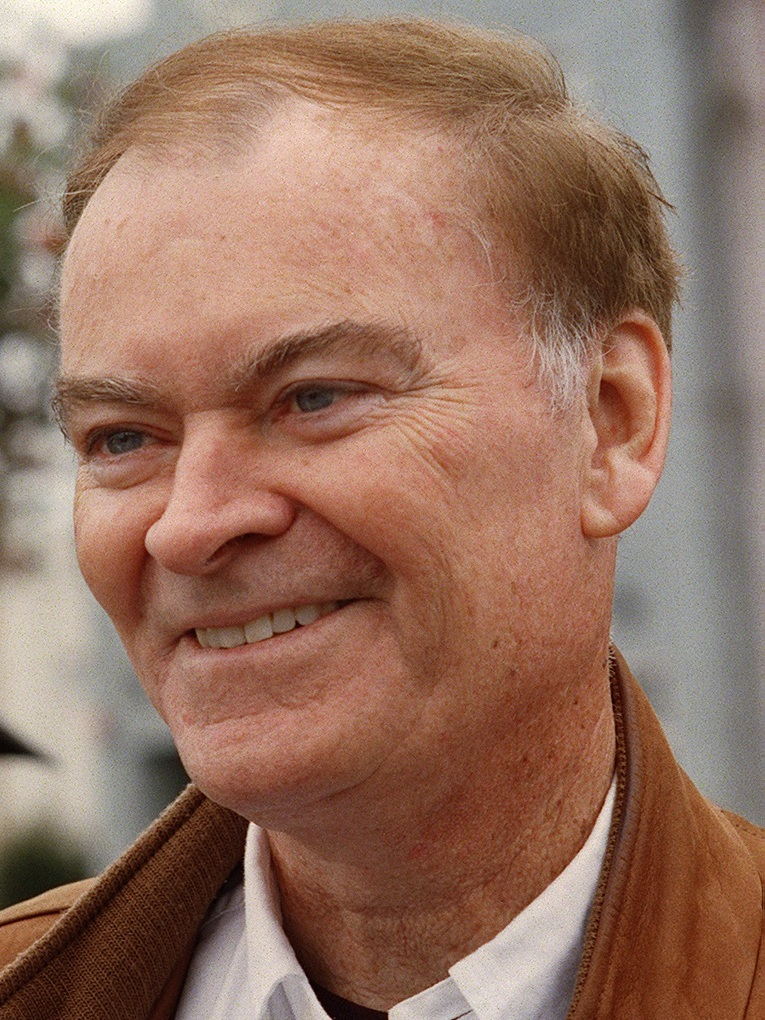

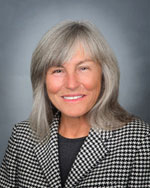
Candidate	Willie Brown	Frank Jordan
Party	Democratic	Democratic
First round vote	72,955	70,764
First round percentage	34.7%	33.66%
Runoff vote	107,500	82,173
Runoff percentage	56.68%	43.32%
Candidate	Roberta Achtenberg
Party	Democratic
First round vote	56,583
First round percentage	26.91%
Mayor before election
Frank Jordan
Democratic
Elected mayor
Willie Brown
Democratic

The 1995 San Francisco mayoral election was held on November 7, 1995, with a runoff election held on December 12, 1995. Former Speaker of the California State Assembly Willie Brown defeated incumbent mayor Frank Jordan in a runoff election to become the 41st Mayor of San Francisco.

== Results ==
San Francisco mayoral election, 1995
Candidate	Votes	%
Willie Brown	72,955	33.66
Frank Jordan (incumbent)	70,764	32.65
Roberta Achtenberg	56,583	26.11
Ben Hom	6,355	2.93
Angela Alioto	1,386	0.64
Joel Ventresca	1,279	0.59
Dan Larkosh	732	0.34
Ellis L. A. Keyes	195	0.09
Invalid or blank votes	6,486	2.99
Total votes	216,735	100.00
Turnout	{{{votes}}}	51.86%
Runoff election
Willie Brown	107,500	55.44
Frank Jordan (incumbent)	82,173	42.38
Invalid or blank votes	4,240	2.19
Total votes	193,913	100.00
Turnout	{{{votes}}}	45.52%
