= Frank Jordan =

American politician (born 1935)

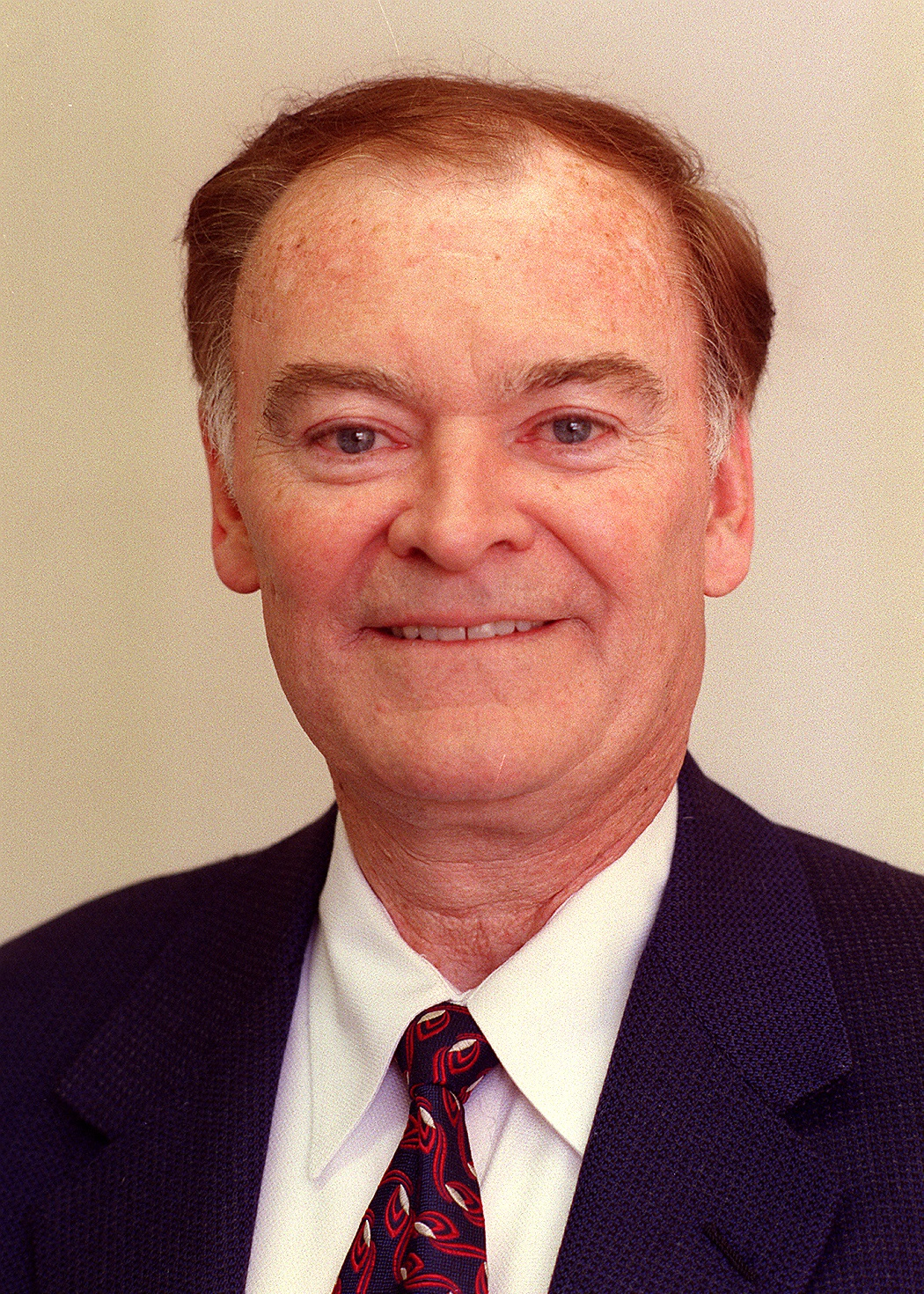

40th Mayor of San Francisco
- In office January 8, 1992 – January 8, 1996
- Preceded by: Art Agnos
- Succeeded by: Willie Brown

Personal details
- Born: Francis Michael Jordan; February 20, 1935 (age 91) San Francisco, California, U.S.
- Party: Democratic
- Spouse: Wendy Paskin
- Children: 3 sons
- Police career
- Department: San Francisco Police Department
- Service years: 1957–1990
- Rank: Chief of Police (1986–1990)

Francis Michael Jordan (born February 20, 1935) is an American politician and former police chief who served as the mayor of San Francisco from 1992 to 1996. He is a member of the Democratic Party.

== Early life and education ==
Jordan was born in San Francisco in 1935 and graduated from Sacred Heart Cathedral Preparatory High School in 1953. He studied political science and government at the University of San Francisco during his time on the police force and graduated in 1975.

== Police career and Chief of Police ==
Before becoming mayor, Jordan served as the Chief of the San Francisco Police Department from 1986 until 1990, at which point he resigned to run for mayor. He joined the force in 1957 and was named Chief of Police by then-Mayor Dianne Feinstein in 1986.

== Mayor of San Francisco ==
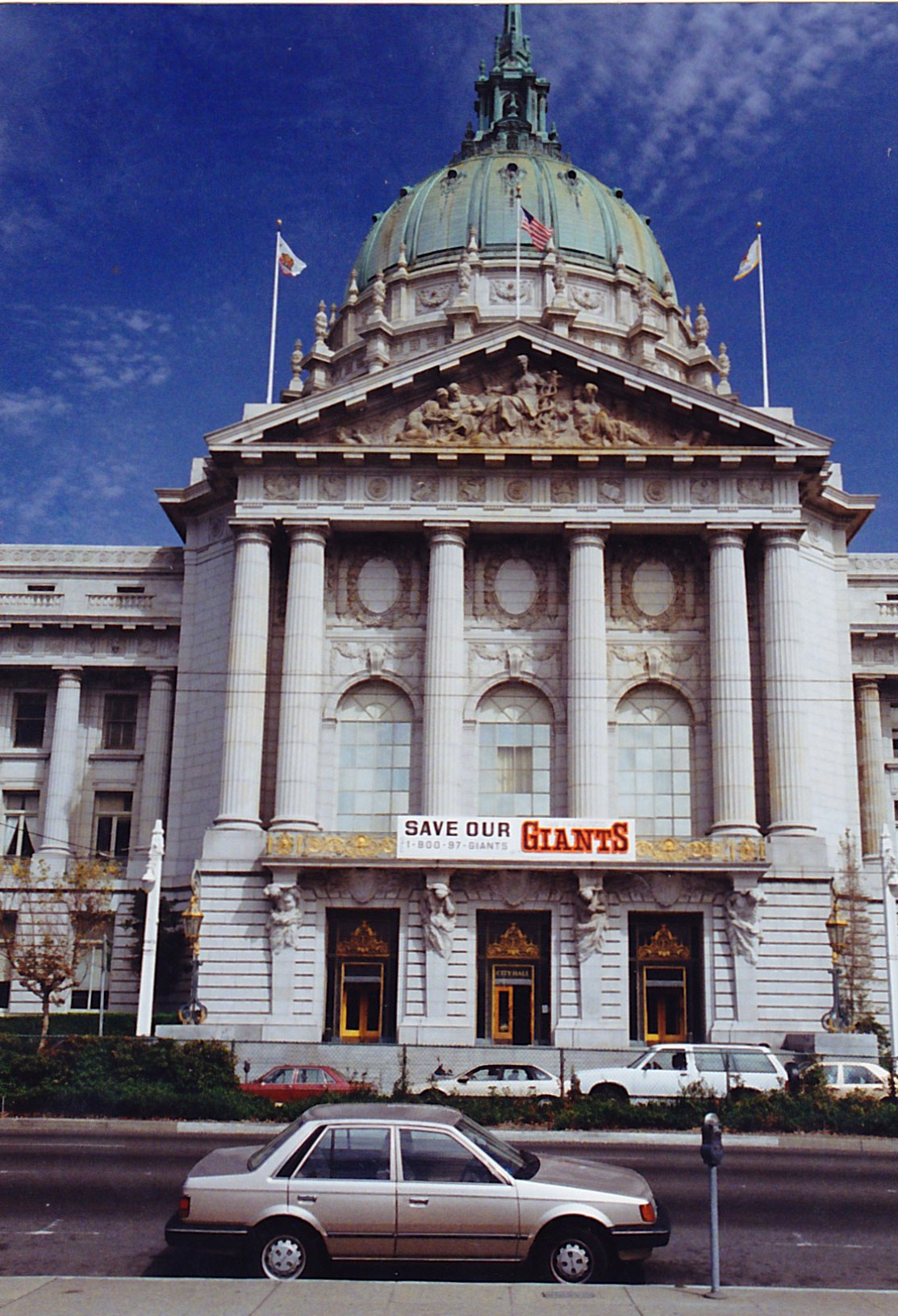
A "Save Our Giants" banner hanging from San Francisco City Hall

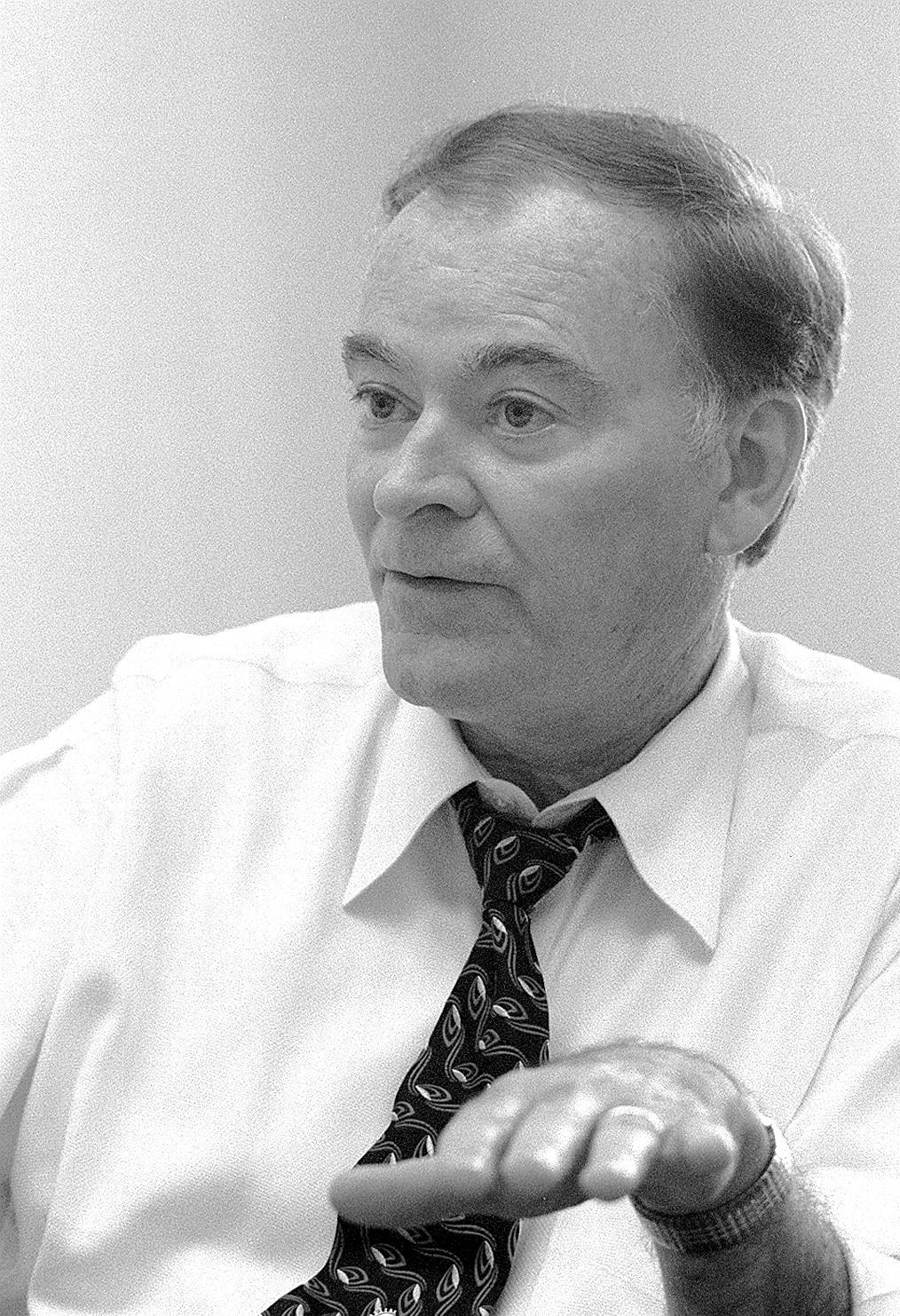
Frank Jordan in 1999

Jordan succeeded Art Agnos as the Mayor of San Francisco from 1992, until 1996. Jordan continued Agnos' campaign against the city's chapter of Food Not Bombs and introduced a controversial program called Matrix which aimed to deal with the city's homelessness problems. During his mayoral tenure Jordan played a role in converting the Presidio Army Base into part of the Golden Gate National Recreation Area, bringing Bay Area Rapid Transit to the San Francisco International Airport, keeping the San Francisco Giants in the city and balancing the city's budget. Jordan was challenged for mayor in the 1995 mayoral election by Willie Brown, who was termed out of the State Assembly. Brown, considered by many to be one of the most powerful African-American politicians in the country, had been defeated only once in a run for public office. Brown and Jordan advanced out of a crowded field to a run-off election, where Brown was victorious. In the 1999 mayoral election, Jordan attempted a comeback bid, but came in third behind Willie Brown and Tom Ammiano.

== Foundation executive ==
Since 2001 Jordan has served as special advisor to the president of the Gordon and Betty Moore Foundation and is the foundation's principal counselor on the impact of potential grants in the nine-county Bay Area. According to the foundation's 2007 annual report, in that year nearly $53 million in grants was devoted to the San Francisco Bay Area.

== Personal life ==
Jordan holds a degree in government and political science from the University of San Francisco, where he has served on the Business Advisory Council since 1989, and teaching credentials from the University of California.

Before 2017, Jordan and his wife, Wendy Paskin-Jordan, owned homes in the Pacific Heights area of San Francisco and in Santa Rosa, California. However, their Santa Rosa residence was destroyed in the October 2017 Northern California wildfires.

Political offices
Preceded by Art Agnos	Mayor of San Francisco; 1992–1996	Succeeded by Willie Brown, Jr.
Police appointments
Preceded by Donald M. Scott	Chief of San Francisco Police Department; 1986–1990	Succeeded by Corneilius P. Murphy
