= Art Agnos =

American politician (born 1938)

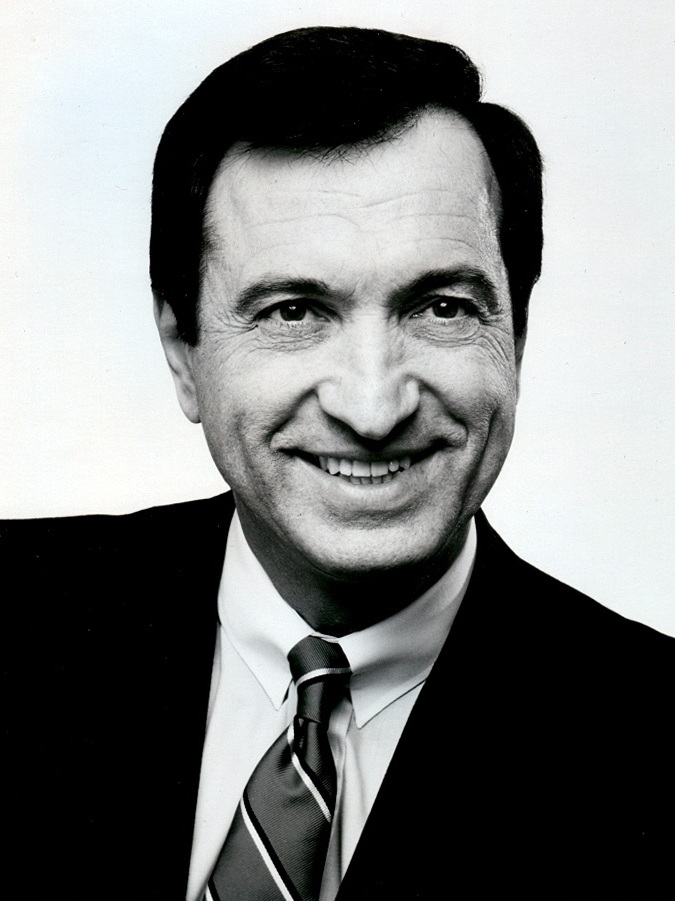
- Agnos in 1988

39th Mayor of San Francisco
- In office January 8, 1988 – January 8, 1992
- Preceded by: Dianne Feinstein
- Succeeded by: Frank Jordan

Member of the California State Assembly from the 16th district
- In office December 6, 1976 – January 8, 1988
- Preceded by: John Francis Foran
- Succeeded by: John Burton

Personal details
- Born: Arthouros Agnos; September 1, 1938 (age 87) Springfield, Massachusetts, U.S.
- Party: Democratic
- Spouse: Sherry Hankins
- Children: 2
- Education: Bates College (BA); Florida State University (MSW)

Arthur Christ Agnos (born Arthouros Agnos; September 1, 1938) is an American politician. He served as the 39th mayor of San Francisco, California from 1988 to 1992 and as the Regional Head of the United States Department of Housing and Urban Development from 1993 to 2001.

== Early life ==
Agnos was born Arthouros Agnos in Springfield, Massachusetts, to Greek immigrants, with roots in Pyrgos. He earned a Bachelor of Arts degree from Bates College and a Master of Social Work from Florida State University. He moved to San Francisco in 1966 and went to work at the San Francisco Housing Authority as a social worker with senior populations.

== Early political career ==
Agnos was asked by California State Assemblyman Leo McCarthy to join his staff in January 1968. McCarthy was elected Speaker of the Assembly in 1974 and Agnos became his chief of staff. During this period, Agnos helped obtain the first California state funding for community-based mental-health services serving the lesbian and gay community, helped pass nursing-home reform, and worked for preservation of farm land.

In 1976, Agnos was elected to the California State Assembly, defeating Harvey Milk in the Democratic primary in the 16th District, which at the time covered the eastern neighborhoods of San Francisco. He served as the chair of the Joint Legislative Audit Committee and as chair of the health subcommittee of the Assembly Ways and Means Committee. Agnos also served as co-chair of the Joint Committee on South East Asian Refugees.

Agnos authored legislation that received national attention for innovative approaches to challenges in health care, welfare, and civil rights, among other areas. He authored California's model welfare reform, GAIN, that matched work requirements with funding for job training, education, and child care. Agnos also authored much of California's response to the HIV/AIDS epidemic, working directly with President Reagan's Surgeon General, C. Everett Koop, M.D., and the president of the National Academy of Sciences, David Baltimore, Ph.D.

Although Agnos arranged for the nation's first Joint Legislative Session on the AIDS/HIV epidemic with Koop and Baltimore, the comprehensive approach to the epidemic failed to muster a majority of votes when the governor failed to support the measure.

Since then, nearly all aspects of Agnos' proposals have become law and policy in California. Agnos also authored laws that provide support for family caregivers, fair child-support payments with a calculation that remains known as the Agnos calculator, safeguards against brain damage in the boxing ring, and legislation to ban discrimination based on sexual orientation.

=== Attempted murder ===
On December 13, 1973, Agnos, who was then a member of the California Commission on Aging, was attending a meeting at the largely-Black public housing project in the San Francisco neighborhood of Potrero Hill, to discuss building a publicly-funded health clinic in the area. After the meeting concluded, Agnos was shot twice in the chest at point-blank range; his life was saved only by the downward trajectory of the bullets. By his own account, he lost a year of his life to recuperation.

The attack was one of the series of Zebra murders and attempted murders in the city, from October 1973 to April 1974. The 15 known killings and attempts were perpetrated by an offshoot group of the Nation of Islam, a black separatist organization, in which "points" were earned by killing a white person. Four of the killers were convicted of murders and sentenced to life imprisonment. Three had died by July 1, 2021.

== Mayor of San Francisco ==
In 1987, Agnos ran for mayor to replace Dianne Feinstein, who was term-limited. Agnos came from behind to defeat Supervisor John Molinari, garnering 70 percent of the vote. Agnos took San Francisco in a different direction, agreeing to a consent decree opposed by Feinstein that opened the way for hiring and promotion of African-Americans and women in the fire department. He changed the priorities for the Redevelopment Commission from creating economic and business opportunities to focus on housing, resulting in the largest increase in affordable housing in twenty years. He disbanded the police unit that had engaged in spying on demonstrations. He empowered the Commission on the Status of Women with subpoena powers and independence and named more minorities and lesbians and gay men to top city commissions and department directors than ever before. He was the first mayor to ride in the annual LGBT Freedom Parade. During his term, the city won top bond ratings, ended deficit spending, and endorsed comparable worth and domestic partners, including health insurance for city workers. Following the Loma Prieta earthquake in 1989, Agnos refused to move homeless people forced from shelters until new housing was available, which led to a nine-month presence in Civic Center, changing the earlier policy of simply moving homeless from one place to another. In 1991, Agnos lost his re-election bid to the former police chief who promised to put the city "back on track" and who was strongly supported by the firefighters and others opposed to Agnos's policy initiatives.

Agnos' liberalism also ran counter to other conservative interests. As mayor, Agnos and his family became the first to ride in the Lesbian Gay Freedom Day Parade, appointed minorities, lesbians and gays to high city posts, and ended the city's opposition to a court-ordered consent decree to hire and promote minorities and women in the fire department which a federal judge opined was "out of control" due to racism when Agnos took office. Agnos ended a police department policy seen as permitting spying on local political organizations and ended the Department's Tactical Squad that critics blamed for abusing citizens. Agnos also strengthened civilian oversight of the Police Department.

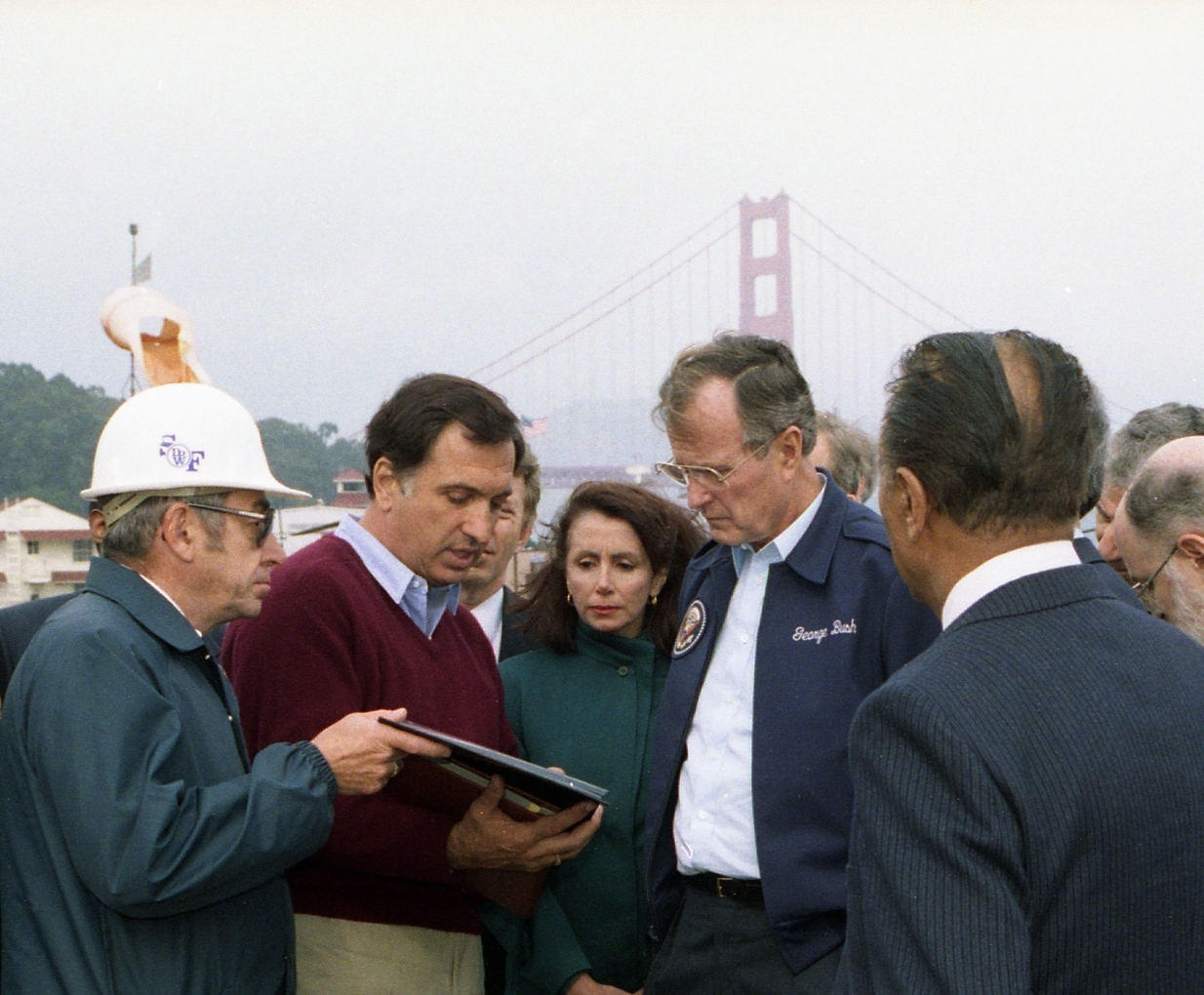
Agnos with Congresswoman Nancy Pelosi and President George H. W. Bush after the Loma Prieta Earthquake

Agnos is best known for leading the city through the recovery of the Loma Prieta earthquake, the worst since 1906, and the decision to tear down the Embarcadero Freeway (SR 480), a double-decker freeway along the city's Embarcadero that was a wall between the waterfront and the city. His decision was strongly opposed by the Chamber of Commerce and the Chinatown community, who found the freeway a convenience for business purposes, and nearly 25,000 signatures were collected to put a measure on the ballot to repeal the decision to tear down the freeway. Once Agnos obtained federal funding, that opposition melted away. A 6–5 vote at the city's Board of Supervisors paved the way to tear down the freeway, which led to the start of a decades-long effort to open up the San Francisco waterfront into what is widely considered one of the best outcomes from the earthquake. However, Agnos's 1991 opponent used the decision to play to Chinatown's sentiments and indicated he opposed tearing down the freeway. In 1991, Chinatown played a significant role in his failure to win re-election. Agnos lost in a 51.5%–48.5% election by a few thousand votes, almost the same as the Chinatown vote.

In recent years, Agnos's decision has been looked to by city leaders and elected officials in Seattle and Toronto, Canada, where Agnos' Embarcadero result is considered a potential model for replacing elevated freeways in urban areas. Under Agnos, the waterfront transit system gained an uninterrupted streetcar line with historic trolley cars running from Fisherman's Wharf in the north to Mission Bay in the south. Agnos added to the waterfront by laying plans for the city's first public access pier, Pier 7, to allow pedestrians to walk out into the Bay. Today, San Francisco has dedicated a new public pier, Pier 14, to honor Agnos for his leadership in opening the city's waterfront.

Agnos' San Francisco struggled with homelessness, a challenge that faced a number of cities in the late 1980s. Agnos convened a task force of providers, homeless advocates, city agency representatives and others to develop an approach that hoped to end the reliance on overnight shelters in favor of programs to help homeless individuals and families become self-reliant. The plan, Beyond Shelter, won national recognition and awards.

The 1989 earthquake resulted in the loss of more than 1,000 low-rent housing units, including units housing those recovering from homelessness. Agnos championed changes in earthquake recovery programs from the federal and state government and from the Red Cross that provided funds to build new facilities and housing to implement the Beyond Shelter program and to restore arts programs and facilities. In 1993, the results were named a Finalist in the Rudy Bruner Award for Urban Excellence.

During the nine months that it took to renovate and open the Beyond Shelter multiservice centers, Agnos allowed homeless individuals to camp in the park in front of City Hall, saying that the alternative was to drive them into neighborhoods and that, as long as they were in front of City Hall, city leaders would be confronted daily with the urgency of the crisis. Critics dubbed the result "Camp Agnos" and called on him to use police force to remove them, which Agnos refused to do.

Agnos remained committed to a program of expanding affordable, low-cost housing in San Francisco. The city increased funding to repair and rehabilitate public housing by 300 percent, changing the vacancy rate from ten percent to one percent. He increased other affordable housing production from 342 units when he took office to 2,240 units, winning San Francisco's first national recognition from the U.S. Department of Housing and Urban Development for Excellence in Rental Rehabilitation and a Special Achievement Award.

Agnos signed a law establishing domestic partner recognition for lesbian and gay couples that had been vetoed by his predecessor, which then became a target of repeal efforts. In 1989, voters narrowly repealed domestic partner recognition. Agnos moved forward with a Family Policy Task Force that recommended broad changes to San Francisco policy and law, including health insurance for domestic partners of city workers. In 1991, the city formally adopted domestic partner health insurance rights for the city's 20,000 employees, the largest employer to do so at that time. In 1991, San Francisco voters approved a new domestic partners recognition law for the city.

Agnos served as chair of the US Conference of Mayors AIDS Task Force, where he organized the lobbying effort that resulted in passage of the Ryan White Care bill. He implemented the policies he advocated as a state legislator, including a 98 percent increase in the city's AIDS budget. He created the Mayors Task Force on the AIDS/HIV Epidemic staffed by Dr. Don Francis, a national leader on AIDS/HIV and credited with leading the effort to eradicate smallpox worldwide.

During his tenure, Agnos also undertook major improvements to the city's infrastructure. As first lady of San Francisco, Agnos's wife Sherry co-chaired the bond campaigns for public school renovations and a new Main Library at Civic Center, and Agnos designated that the existing Main Library become the new home for the Asian Art Museum that had been in Golden Gate Park. Agnos ended the nation's longest stalled public works project at Yerba Buena to develop a cultural hub that includes the Museum of Modern Art, Yerba Buena Center, and Yerba Buena Gardens. Agnos also proposed a waterfront site for a new San Francisco Giants ballpark, but the proposal narrowly lost in November 1989 weeks after the Loma Prieta earthquake absorbed public attention. Later the Giants ballpark was sited at the location Agnos designated and built to the same overall design by the architects and developers he selected originally.

== Post-mayoral career ==
During the Clinton administration, Agnos served as regional director of the U.S. Department of Housing and Urban Development for California, Arizona, Nevada, and Hawaii. Agnos also served as acting FHA commissioner and acting assistant secretary for housing, as well as director of the Special Actions Office.

Agnos led HUD's effort to uplift San Francisco's Visitacion Valley, blighted by twin 20-story high-rises supported by HUD and which were unsafe for the residents and the community. Agnos created a partnership with the city, the residents, local community leaders, and HUD that led to the demolishing of Geneva Towers in 1998 and a new resident-led housing development of townhouses and apartments.

Agnos also crafted a HUD partnership for teacher housing in San Francisco and communities with excess land set aside for schools. Under the program, HUD financing supported construction and rental assistance for housing dedicated for teachers. San Jose, California, has a similar program now in effect.

Agnos worked with city leaders throughout the region to create the first funding for homeless coordination between neighboring cities to address concerns that services were not well matched with those in need.

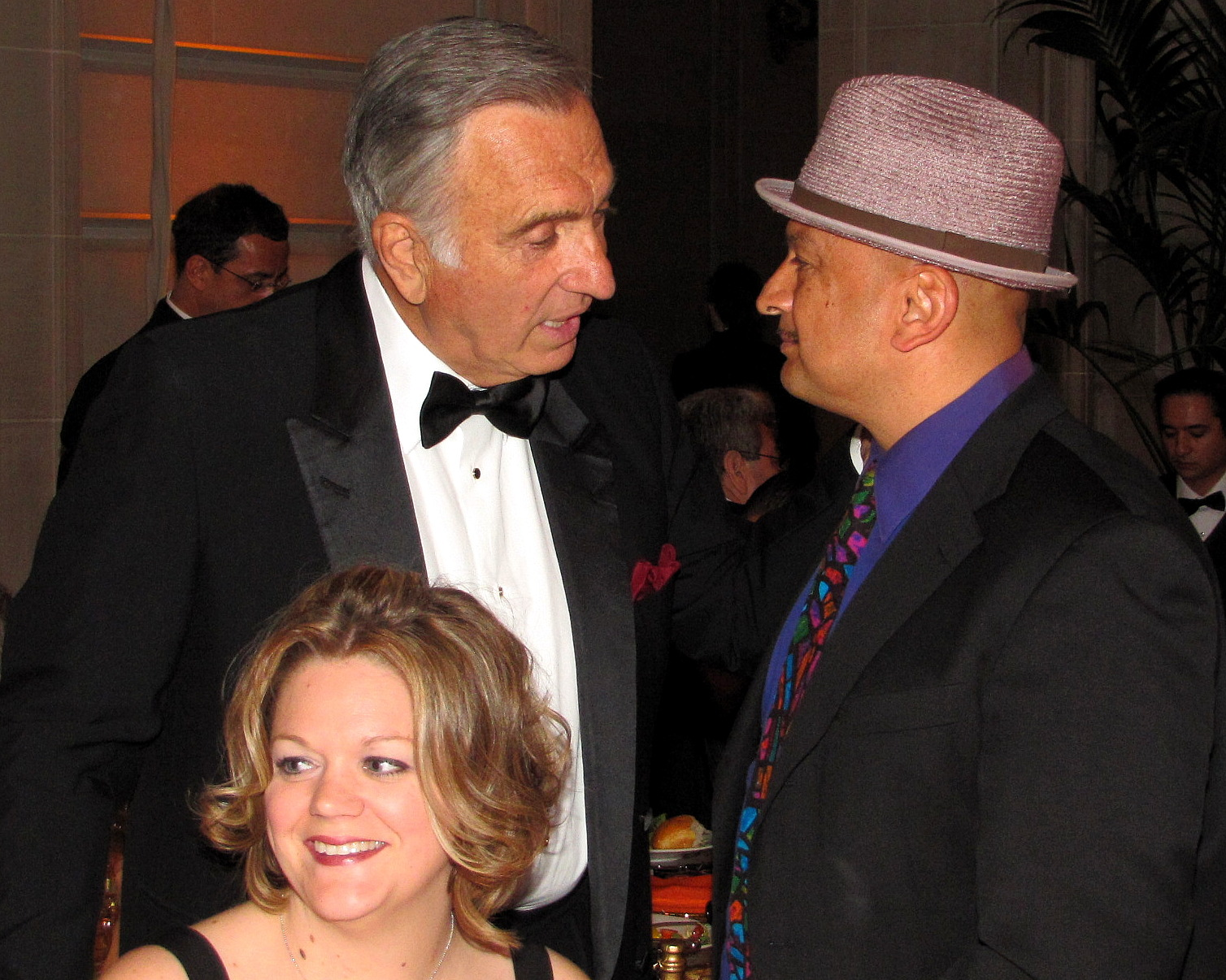
Former mayor Agnos in 2010

Agnos also led an effort to combat predatory lending aimed at minority homeowners and to repeal "racial covenants" barring non-whites from living or staying overnight in many California communities.

Agnos worked with his mentor former California Assembly Speaker and Lt. Governor Leo T. McCarthy to establish the Leo T. McCarthy Center for Public Service and the Common Good at the University of San Francisco. He has frequently been called upon by the US State Department, the National Democratic Institute, the Asia Foundation, and other international bodies to provide leadership development on democracy building, including in the Russian Far East, the Kurdish regions of Turkey, Zaire, Sierra Leone, Angola, Korea, and as one of the first officials to arrive in Bethlehem to offer disaster assistance after the Israeli army siege of the Church of the Nativity ended on May 10, 2002. He also is frequently sought as a speaker on disaster preparedness and recovery.

In 2007, Agnos was appointed as receiver for the troubled San Francisco Housing Authority. The Housing Authority sued to block the court order, and the matter went before the California Court of Appeals. The city still failed to act for two years, while appealing Agnos' appointment. By April 2009, the SF Chronicle reported that continued inaction while Agnos' appointment remained in court "seemed to jolt City Hall into action. Agnos never took control of the agency; instead, Fortner resigned under pressure from Newsom, who appointed Mirian Saez, director of operations at Treasure Island, to run the agency on an interim basis before hiring Alvarez. Under Saez and then Alvarez, the agency sold off properties to satisfy the judgments."

Agnos' most recent projects also include advising the founders of Open House, the first senior housing planned for elderly gay, lesbian, bisexual and transgender people in San Francisco as well as a project working with young families seeking to improve neighborhood schools in their neighborhood of Potrero Hill in San Francisco, and he has worked as a consultant with Minnesota-based Cargill and Arizona-based DMB Associates on their controversial plan to develop a bay salt pond in Redwood City.

Agnos has become involved with restricting the building of new housing in San Francisco. He strongly opposed the 8 Washington condominium project in 2013, in support of "No Wall on the Waterfront". Agnos also was a prominent advocate for Proposition B, a precedent-setting measure approved by a wide margin by voters in June 2014 that required developments along the waterfront to win voter approval if the plan called for a height that exceeded the height limits established in the Waterfront Land Use plan first approved by voters in 1990 and implemented in 1997. He is also involved with attempts to block the redevelopment of the San Francisco Flower Mart. In 2024, he supported legislation to restrict new housing development in San Francisco's Northern Waterfront.

== Personal life ==
The San Francisco Chronicle called Agnos a "longtime practical joker". Agnos is married to Sherry Hankins and has two sons.

California Assembly
Preceded by John Francis Foran	Member of the California State Assembly from the 16th district 1976–1988	Succeeded by John Burton
Political offices
Preceded by Dianne Feinstein	Mayor of San Francisco; 1988–1992	Succeeded by Frank Jordan
Preceded by Robert J. De Monte	HUD Regional Administrator, Region 9; 1993–2001	Succeeded by Richard Rainey
