= Garment of Shadows =

Novel by Laurie R. King

- First edition
- Author: Laurie R. King
- Language: English
- Series: Mary Russell
- Genre: Detective fiction
- Publisher: Bantam Books
- Publication date: 2012
- Publication place: United States
- Media type: Print (hardback)
- Pages: 288
- ISBN: 978-0-7490-1222-9
- LC Class: PS3561.I4813 G37 2012
- Preceded by: Pirate King
- Followed by: Dreaming Spies

Garment of Shadows is a mystery novel by the American author Laurie R. King. It was published in 2012 by Bantam Books.

The 12th in the Mary Russell series, the story features married detectives Mary Russell and Sherlock Holmes. The events of the novel follow those of Pirate King with their old friends, Ali and Mahmoud Hazr (O Jerusalem and Justice Hall).

At the end of 1924, Mary Russell has just finished work with Fflytte Films in Morocco but she is not where she should be when her husband, Sherlock Holmes, goes to meet her in Fez. In fact, when she awakens in a strange room she does not know where or who she is, having taken a great blow to the head.
