= Dreaming Spies =

2015 mystery novel by American author Laurie R. King

- Author: Laurie R. King
- Language: English
- Series: Mary Russell
- Genre: Detective fiction
- Publisher: Bantam Press
- Publication date: February 17, 2015
- Publication place: United States
- Media type: Print (hardback)
- ISBN: 978-0-345-53179-7
- Preceded by: Garment of Shadows
- Followed by: The Murder of Mary Russell

Dreaming Spies is a 2015 mystery novel by American author Laurie R. King. Thirteenth in the Mary Russell series, the story features married detectives Mary Russell and Sherlock Holmes. Although written thirteenth in sequence, the events in this book take place between those described in The Game and Locked Rooms.

The book was published by Bantam Press on February 17, 2015. The audiobook is narrated by Jenny Sterlin.

It is 1925, and Mary Russell and Sherlock Holmes arrive home to find a stone. A stone with a name, which they last saw in the Tokyo garden of the future emperor of Japan. It is the first indication that the investigation they did for him in 1924, might not be as complete as they had thought. In Japan, there were spies, in Oxford there are dreams. In both places, there is a small, dark-haired woman, and danger.
