= A Letter of Mary =

1997 novel by Laurie R. King

- First edition
- Author: Laurie R. King
- Language: English
- Series: Mary Russell
- Genre: Detective novel
- Publisher: St. Martin's Press
- Publication date: 1997
- Publication place: United States
- Media type: Print (hardback & paperback)
- ISBN: 0-312-14670-1
- OCLC: 34663436
- Dewey Decimal: 813/.54 20
- LC Class: PS3561.I4813 L47 1997
- Preceded by: A Monstrous Regiment of Women
- Followed by: The Moor

A Letter of Mary is the third in the Mary Russell mystery series of novels by Laurie R. King. This is the first case that Mary Russell and Sherlock Holmes work on together as husband and wife. The story features a cameo by Lord Peter Wimsey.

== Plot summary ==
In August 1923, Mary Russell and husband Sherlock Holmes receive an unexpected visit from Dorothy Ruskin, an elderly amateur archeologist from the Holy Land, who met the couple four and a half years earlier during the events from O Jerusalem (novel). As a gift, Ruskin presents Russell with an inlaid box containing a papyrus scroll, which seems to be a genuine first-century letter by Mary Magdalene. When she returns to London that evening, Ruskin is killed in a hit-and-run accident with only two witnesses.

When Holmes and Russell visit London to identify the body, they discover evidence of foul play. Before her murder, Ruskin had argued with a sponsor of the digs, Colonel Dennis Edwards. A letter from her sister Mrs. Erica Rogers, who cares for their aged mother, reveals that two Middle Eastern visitors were also looking for Ruskin after her visit home. Finally, Holmes and Russell find their Sussex home ransacked by three suspects who were looking for papers, perhaps for Mary’s papyrus scroll. When Russell translates Mary’s letter, she finds that Mary calls herself an apostle of Jesus, and contemplates the theological and historical implications.

Three distinct suspects and possibilities emerge: Colonel Edwards, who did not know he was sponsoring a woman’s project, could have been enraged to violence; the Middle Eastern visitors may have been from a Palestinian family with a grudge against Ruskin; and Rogers was resentful toward her sister, though according to Ruskin’s will, she does not benefit from Ruskin’s early death. To pursue each different line of investigation, the four split their forces: Mycroft Holmes looks into the Middle Eastern visitors, Holmes goes into Erica Rogers’s employ, while Inspector Lestrade directs the efforts of the police, and Russell finds work as Colonel Edwards’s secretary.

In Colonel Edwards’s employ, Russell grows to like the colonel but is repelled by his misogyny as well as Gerald, his lecherous son. She also finds strong evidence of the colonel's antagonism against Ruskin, but nothing more incriminating. After a week of investigations, Russell, Mycroft, and Lestrade have little to show, but Holmes has succeeded in finding parts of the car that killed Ruskin, salvaged from scraps sold by Jason Rogers, Erica Rogers’ grandson. Holmes also produces a letter from Ruskin to Rogers, implying that Erica Rogers is suffering from a mental illness. Building the case, Holmes then persuades Russell to use the hypnotization techniques practiced on her as a child after her family’s death on one of the witnesses to Ruskin’s murder. Russell’s efforts help unlock memories of that evening, and the witness identifies Jason Rogers as the perpetrator. However, when Erica Rogers is brought in, she discerns that the authorities have little solid evidence and no motive, and refuses to cooperate.

Frustrated, Holmes and Russell return home to brood over the case, searching for a hidden motive. Russell recalls that Ruskin had complimented Holmes’s hands and his ability to solve puzzles, bringing both of them to realize the box she left them with may have a hidden compartment. Holmes successfully opens it to reveal another will that Ruskin had drawn up leaving all her money to the archeological digs. Upon hearing of the changed will, Erica Rogers suffers a massive stroke and Jason Rogers commits suicide, while their third accomplice is brought to justice. Holmes deduces that Erica Rogers had masterminded the entire plot to keep most of their family's fortune from going to the archeological digs, and suspected her sister of lodging a will with Holmes, thus precipitating the ransacking of the Sussex home. In the epilogue, Russell states that Mary’s letter will not be published until after her death, and hopes that her heirs will find a world more accepting of the letter and its contents.
