= Locked room (disambiguation) =

A locked-room mystery is a type of crime featured in detective fiction.

Locked room may also refer to:

- The Locked Room, a 1972 mystery novel
- The Locked Room (1986), the third part of The New York Trilogy series of novels
- "The Locked Room" (Patience), a 2025 television episode
- "The Locked Room" (True Detective), a 2014 television episode
- Locked Rooms, a 2005 book by Laurie R. King
