= Laurie King =

Laurie King may refer to:

- Laurie R. King (born 1952), American author
- Laurie King (footballer) (1908–1992), Australian rules footballer
