= To Play the Fool =

Novel by Laurie R. King

- Author: Laurie R. King
- Language: English
- Series: Kate Martinelli series
- Publisher: St. Martin's Press
- Publication date: 1995
- Publication place: United States
- Media type: Print (hardback & paperback)
- Pages: 260
- ISBN: 978-0-312-11907-2
- OCLC: 34963280
- Preceded by: A Grave Talent
- Followed by: With Child

To Play the Fool is the second book in the Kate Martinelli series by Laurie R. King. Preceded by A Grave Talent and followed by the novel With Child, it describes the investigation into the murder of a homeless man.

== Plot summary ==
A homeless man is murdered and Kate must determine the culprit's identity. Everything seems to point to a man whom the homeless community regards as an important religious figure.

== Characters in To Play the Fool ==
- Kate Martinelli is a member of the San Francisco Police Department.
- Lee Cooper is Kate's lover.
- Al Hawkin is Kate's partner at work.

== Allusions/references to other works ==
The title is taken from William Shakespeare's Twelfth Night (Act 3, scene 1), in which Feste the jester is described as "wise enough to play the fool."
