= A Grave Talent =

1993 book by Laurie R. King

- First edition
- Author: Laurie R. King
- Language: English
- Series: Kate Martinelli series
- Genre: Mystery novel
- Published: 1993 (St. Martin's Press)
- Publication place: United States
- Media type: Print (hardback & paperback)
- Pages: 310 pp
- ISBN: 0-312-08804-3
- OCLC: 27034919
- Dewey Decimal: 813/.54 20
- LC Class: PS3561.I4813 G7 1993
- Followed by: To Play the Fool

A Grave Talent (1993) is the first book in Laurie R. King's Kate Martinelli series. Concerning the search for the murderer of several young girls, it won the 1994 Edgar Award for Best First Novel. It is followed by To Play the Fool.

== Plot summary ==
The strangulation of four children in the vicinity of San Francisco leads the police force to appoint inspectors Al Hawkin and Kate ("Casey") Martinelli to discover the criminal. Suspicion falls on renowned artist Vaun Adams, convicted of murdering a young girl years before.

When someone attempts to murder Vaun herself, the police are forced to conclude that someone else must be behind the murders, and they discover that Vaun's ex-boyfriend, maniacally egotistical Andy Lewis, must be the perpetrator.

Hawkin convinces a reluctant Kate to set the trap for Lewis in her home by letting Vaun recover there. He arrives and declares that he will kill Kate and her lover Lee and leave Vaun to take the blame. Lee alerts the police to his presence, but the sniper who kills Lewis does not do so in time to prevent him from shooting and permanently disabling her.

== Characters in A Grave Talent ==
- Kate Martinelli is a member of the San Francisco Police Department. She is extremely reserved.
- Lee Cooper is Kate's lover. A psychologist, she is nearly Kate's opposite in personality. At the end of the book, she is recovering from a bullet wound.
- Al Hawkin is Kate's partner at work. He falls in love with one of the witnesses in their case.
- Vaun Adams is a highly talented artist targeted by her psychopathic ex-boyfriend from high school. Instead of using more modern techniques, she prefers a realistic method and is thus criticized. Kate and Lee take her in while she is recovering from Lewis's first attempt to kill her.
- Andy Lewis murders several girls and disposes of the bodies near Vaun Adams's house in order to frame her for the murders. When this does not work, he attempts to kill Vaun but fails. He tries again after she has temporarily moved into Kate and Lee's home. Although a police sniper eventually kills him, he does shoot Lee.

== Allusions/references to other works ==
- Kate and Lee's dialogue at the beginning of the book references Dorothy L. Sayers's detective Lord Peter Wimsey.
- Lewis's pseudonym, Dodgson, is an allusion to Lewis Carroll's real name.

== Awards and nominations ==
A Grave Talent won the Edgar Award for Best First Novel in 1994.

== Release details ==
1993, USA, St. Martin's Press, ISBN 0-312-08804-3, Pub date 1993, Hardback
