= The Murder of Mary Russell =

2016 mystery novel by Laurie R. King

- First edition
- Author: Laurie R. King
- Language: English
- Series: Mary Russell
- Genre: Detective fiction
- Publisher: Bantam Books
- Publication place: United States
- Preceded by: Dreaming Spies
- Followed by: Island of the Mad

The Murder of Mary Russell is a 2016 mystery novel by American author Laurie R. King. Fourteenth in the Mary Russell series featuring married detectives Mary Russell and Sherlock Holmes, the novel focuses on the story of the couple's longtime housekeeper, Mrs. Hudson.
