= A Monstrous Regiment of Women =

1995 novel by Laurie R. King

- First edition
- Author: Laurie R. King
- Language: English
- Series: Mary Russell
- Genre: Detective novel
- Publisher: St. Martin's Press
- Publication date: Sep 1995
- Publication place: United States
- Media type: Print (hardback & paperback)
- Pages: 326
- ISBN: 0-312-13565-3
- Preceded by: The Beekeeper's Apprentice
- Followed by: A Letter of Mary

A Monstrous Regiment of Women is the second book in the Mary Russell series of mystery novels by Laurie R. King.

The title is taken from a 1558 polemic by John Knox, The First Blast of the Trumpet Against the Monstrous Regiment of Women, against the female sovereigns of his day, particularly Mary I of England and Mary, Queen of Scots.

== Plot summary ==
In the winter of 1920, Mary Russell is on the cusp of turning 21 and lives a double life of Oxford University theological scholar as well as a consulting detective and partner of Sherlock Holmes. After events in The Beekeeper's Apprentice, both Holmes and Russell are aware that their relationship and partnership has changed, perhaps romantically, but neither is eager to broach the subject.

A chance encounter unites Russell with Veronica Beaconsfield, an old Oxford acquaintance who is worried about her former fiancé, Miles Fitzwarren, a returned soldier and drug addict. Veronica introduces Russell to the well-financed New Temple in God and its leader, the enigmatic, charismatic Margery Childe, who preaches empowerment of women. Russell believes Margery to be a mystic and begins tutoring Margery in theology and reading Scripture, integrating into their lessons her own current academic work on feminism and Judaism. Russell also witnesses what she believes to be a true miracle, in which Margery is healed of serious physical wounds through prayer. Meanwhile, Holmes takes on Miles's rehabilitation partially as a favor to Russell.

When an attempt is made on Veronica's life, Holmes and Russell discover a mysterious pattern of deaths where fairly wealthy women have left large bequests to the Temple. Coming into her inheritance at age 21, Russell takes on the role of a young heiress to insinuate herself into the Temple's leadership. While learning more about the Temple's operations, Russell also fends off an attacker who threatens Margery.

En route back to Oxford, Russell is kidnapped by a man whom she identifies from descriptions of Margery's husband, Claude. He keeps Russell prisoner and injects her with regular doses of heroin. Against the effects of the drug and solitary confinement, Russell struggles to retain her identity and will to survive, and in the face of possible death, contemplates her love for Holmes. Nine days later, she is rescued by Holmes, who also helps her overcome her reliance on the drug.

Undeterred by her ordeal, Russell breaks into Margery's safe but finds no evidence indicating Margery's complicity in the deaths. The next morning, Holmes and Russell follow Margery, who has gone to confront Claude, disturbed by his actions concerning Mary. In the ensuing chase and fight, Margery is wounded, Claude is killed, and Holmes narrowly survives. The near-death experience pushes both Holmes and Russell to admit their passion for one another. In the ensuing trial, Margery is acquitted of blame, but voluntarily exiles herself from England. Veronica and a recovered Miles finally marry, as do Holmes and Russell.

== Timeframe ==
This book takes place from 26 December 1920 to early February in 1921. Locations include London, Oxford and Sussex. Mary turns 21 on January 2, 1921, and Holmes's age is 58.

== Characters ==
- Mary Russell
- Sherlock Holmes
- Veronica Beaconsfield
- Margery Childe
- Mycroft Holmes
- Inspector Lestrade

== Feminism and Religion ==
The book deals heavily with the intersection of feminism and religion; more specifically, their combination in the form of the character Margery Childe. When Mary first hears her speak, Margery is discussing a passage from 1 Corinthians in the Christian Bible:

"Women should keep silence in church; for they are not permitted to speak, but should be subordinate, as the law says...It is shameful for a woman to speak in church."

Margery's conclusion is that men are afraid of the questions women might ask concerning religion, the Bible, and God, and realize that women are not inferior. She points out that the Bible describes both men and women being created in God's image - not just males. She dissects the "Adam's rib" creation story, noting that humanity was not complete until woman was created. Mary, a theology scholar, mentions to Margery that in the original biblical manuscripts, there are numerous references to God in the feminine; using "She" and "Her" instead of "His and "Him". Mary has learned through her research that these references were removed as the works were translated into other languages, presumably so that God would appear as a wholly masculine being. In an author interview, Laurie R. King is noted to describe herself as a "...feminist-although that basically means I support the right of a woman to get paid for doing the same job as a man, not that I believe men to be inferior or superfluous."

== Holmes's Past ==
There is a mention of Holmes having fathered a son, and to Holmes having gone through a very rough period while his son fought a drug addiction. There are also references to a relationship with Irene Adler.

== Reception ==
In a paper examining the feminist narrative in a contemporary context, Lillian Doherty felt disappointed by the ending, believing Mary failed to "uphold the honour of the feminists" when she needed to be rescued by Holmes.
