= The God of the Hive =

2010 novel by Laurie R. King

- 2010 first edition (US)
- Author: Laurie R. King
- Language: English
- Series: Mary Russell
- Genre: Detective fiction
- Publisher: Bantam Books (US); Allison & Busby (UK)
- Publication date: 2010
- Publication place: United States
- Media type: Print (hardback)
- Pages: 354
- ISBN: 0-553-80554-1
- Preceded by: The Language of Bees
- Followed by: Pirate King

The God of the Hive is a 2010 mystery novel by American author Laurie R. King. Tenth in the Mary Russell series, the story features married detectives Mary Russell and Sherlock Holmes. The novel begins almost immediately after the close of King's preceding novel, The Language of Bees.

== Plot summary ==
Mary Russell and Sherlock Holmes are each on the trail, seeking to expose a ruthless villain and ensure the safety of Holmes' artist son, Damian Adler, and Adler's half-Chinese daughter, three-year-old Estelle. The search involves the British practitioners of a religious cult called The Children of Lights with roots in Shanghai, China.

The plot picks up in the summer of 1924 near an ancient circle of standing stones on Orkney Island, shortly after religious fanatic Thomas Brothers, who seeks to unleash psychic energies through human sacrifice, shot Holmes's artist son, Damian Adler. Holmes's search for medical help to save his son's life takes him to Holland, while Mary travels through Britain in an effort to keep Estelle safe from Brothers and his allies.

Brothers' shadowy connections have led to a conspiracy deeply entrenched in the highest echelons of government. Mycroft Holmes finds himself questioned and under suspicion and the family members are actively pursued by Scotland Yard. In the process a modern-day Robin Goodfellow emerges to lend aid to Mary and her kin.
