= Kate Martinelli =

Kate Martinelli is the fictional lesbian detective featured in novelist’s Laurie R. King mysteries. The books are set in San Francisco, where Martinelli serves as a police officer with her partner, Alonzo Hawkin. The first book in the series, A Grave Talent, won an Edgar Award in 1994 for Best First Mystery Novel.

== Books ==
- A Grave Talent (1993) ISBN 0-312-08804-3
- To Play the Fool (1995) ISBN 0-312-11907-0
- With Child (1996) ISBN 0-312-14077-0
- Night Work (2000) ISBN 0-553-10713-5
- The Art of Detection (2006) ISBN 0-553-80453-7
- Beginnings (2019) ISBN 9781732464728
