= Night Work (King novel) =

Novel by Laurie R. King

- Author: Laurie R. King
- Language: English
- Series: Kate Martinelli series
- Genre: Mystery novel
- Publisher: Bantam Books
- Publication date: 2000
- Publication place: United States
- Media type: Print (hardback & paperback)
- Preceded by: With Child
- Followed by: The Art of Detection

Night Work is the fourth book in the Kate Martinelli series by Laurie R. King. It is preceded by With Child and followed by The Art of Detection.
