= The Language of Bees =

Novel by Laurie R. King

- First edition (US)
- Author: Laurie R. King
- Language: English
- Series: Mary Russell
- Genre: Detective fiction
- Publisher: Bantam Books (US); Allison & Busby (UK)
- Publication date: 2009
- Publication place: United States
- Media type: Print (hardback)
- ISBN: 0-553-80454-5
- Preceded by: Locked Rooms
- Followed by: The God of the Hive

The Language of Bees is a 2009 mystery novel by American author Laurie R. King. Ninth in King's Mary Russell series, the story features detectives Mary Russell and her husband Sherlock Holmes. The events of the novel follow soon after those found in King's preceding novel, Locked Rooms.

== Plot summary ==
Russell and Holmes return to their home in Sussex, England, in 1924 after seven months abroad in India, Japan and California. The novel features a domestic mystery as a hive on Holmes's farm has been repeatedly swarming and a colony of bees is found to have disappeared. Action shifts, however, with the reappearance of Damian Adler, a talented young painter and emotionally disturbed veteran of World War I, first introduced in the second book in the series. Adler is Holmes' estranged son, born to Irene Adler in about 1895. The distraught Adler seeks the couple's help in locating his missing wife Yolanda and their daughter Estelle.

Russell and Holmes separate during the investigation and Russell searches out Damian's questionable past. The search involves the British practitioners of a religious cult called The Children of Lights with roots in Shanghai, China, and features locations ranging from Bohemian London to the wilds of Scotland. Russell experiences a harrowing trip by aeroplane. A series of bodies appears, some dead by suicide and others ritually sacrificed. While the climax of the novel, in an ancient circle of standing stones in Orkney, brings some plot resolution, the story continues in The God of the Hive (2010).
