= George Wittman =

San Francisco chief of police who was fired

George W. Wittman
- Wittman c. 1902
- Born: 1857
- Died: 1950 (aged 92–93)
- Police career
- Country: San Francisco Police Department
- Allegiance: United States
- Status: Dismissed
- Rank: Chief of Police

George W. Wittman (1857–1950) was a San Francisco Police officer and chief of police.

Wittman is the only San Francisco police chief ever fired outright. During the period before the 1906 San Francisco earthquake, business interests desired the removal of the Chinese from San Francisco's Chinatown because the property was valuable as the city was still centered on Portsmouth Square. The plan was to expropriate the land and move the Chinese to Hunters Point. At a rehearing on Wittman's firing in 1975, both historian Kevin Starr and city historian Gladys Hansen stated that Wittman was railroaded.

Hansen stated that the city wanted to move the Chinese and, "to make people believe the removal was for the betterment of the city and not a lucrative business deal, someone in high office had to be blamed for allowing vice to exist in Chinatown". Wittman took the fall (SF Examiner July 10, 1975).

== See also ==
- San Francisco Police Department
