= The Moor (novel) =

Book by Laurie R. King

- First edition
- Author: Laurie R. King
- Language: English
- Series: Mary Russell
- Genre: Detective fiction
- Publisher: St. Martin's Press
- Publication date: January 1998
- Publication place: United States
- Media type: Print (hardback & paperback)
- Pages: 307
- ISBN: 0-312-16934-5
- OCLC: 37666365
- Dewey Decimal: 813/.54 21
- LC Class: PS3561.I4813 M67 1998
- Preceded by: A Letter of Mary
- Followed by: O Jerusalem

The Moor is the fourth book in Mary Russell series by Laurie R. King.

Mary Russell and Sherlock Holmes investigate strange goings-on on Dartmoor. Reprising the setting and some of the plotlines of The Hound of the Baskervilles, Holmes and Russell come to the aid of the Reverend Sabine Baring-Gould.

For an excerpt of the first chapter, go to Laurie R. King's website.

== Timeline ==
The events in the book take place between September and November 1923.

== Plot ==
The book opens with Mary Russell receiving a telegram to come immediately to Devon and to bring her compass. Initially Mary is reluctant to abandon her academic studies in Oxford to assist Sherlock, but she finally complies. This tug and pull of the two individuals in their own professional lives erupts throughout the book to show each person's independence, yet reliance on each other.

Sherlock has been called in to solve a murder on Dartmoor. For Sherlock, it's familiar territory; it's where he solved the case of The Hound of the Baskervilles. This time round there are tales of a ghostly hound out on the moors, accompanying an equally ghostly carriage. And naturally, the story is populated with sinister local characters.

The moor is central to the story, brooding over it as the moor broods over the surrounding landscape. It also has Rev. Sabine Baring-Gould (who was a real person and a noted scholar) as a central character. He has a strong intellectual curiosity and is the driving force behind the investigation.

Laurie King uses many of the elements of The Hound of the Baskervilles. These elements are introduced deliberately on the part of the criminals and there are echoes of the original story. The way that Holmes reacts to the many mentions of the original case, with a mixture of pride and exasperation, allows for some very humorous moments.
