= Island of the Mad =

2018 novel by Laurie R. King

- First edition
- Author: Laurie R. King
- Language: English
- Series: Mary Russell
- Genre: Detective fiction
- Publisher: Bantam Books
- Publication date: June 12, 2018
- Publication place: United States
- Media type: Print (hardback)
- ISBN: 978-0-804-17796-2
- Preceded by: The Murder of Mary Russell
- Followed by: Riviera Gold

Island of the Mad is a 2018 mystery novel by American author Laurie R. King. Fifteenth in the Mary Russell series, the story features married detectives Mary Russell and Sherlock Holmes. The events of the novel follow shortly after that of The Murder of Mary Russell.

The book was published by Bantam Books on June 12, 2018. The audiobook published by Recorded Books is narrated by Jenny Sterlin.
