= Jesse B. Cook =

Jesse Brown Cook
- Jesse Brown Cook
- Born: Jesse Brown Cook; 1860; San Antonio, Texas, United States
- Died: 1938 (aged 77–78); Los Angeles, California, United States
- Resting place: Holy Cross Cemetery, Colma, California, United States
- Known for: Chief of Police after 1906 San Francisco earthquake; Sergeant of "Chinatown Squad"; Police Commissioner
- Notable work: Description of San Francisco's Chinatown in San Francisco Police and Peace Officers' Journal (June 1931)
- Police career
- Service: Police Officer
- Allegiance: United States
- Department: San Francisco Police Department
- Service years: Late 19th century – early 20th century
- Status: Retired (later Police Commissioner)
- Rank: Chief of Police; Sergeant
- Other work: Collector of police history materials now held at Bancroft Library

Jesse Brown Cook (1860–1938) was a San Francisco police officer, chief and a police commissioner. He held a position of authority in the San Francisco police department's Chinatown Squad, policing the local ethnic neighborhood. He was appointed as the Chief of Police in 1906, and left the position in the 1930s. From 1895 to 1936, he worked on a personal project to document history in San Francisco, resulting in a catalog of 12,000 media items entitled the Jesse Cook Scrapbooks.

Cook (seated, center) with the Chinatown Squad, 1904
