= The Art of Detection =

- Author: Laurie R. King
- Language: English
- Series: Kate Martinelli series
- Genre: Novel
- Publisher: Bantam Books
- Publication date: May 30, 2006
- Publication place: United States
- Media type: Print (Hardback & Paperback)
- Pages: 386 pp (Bantam Books hardback)
- ISBN: 0-553-80453-7
- OCLC: 62858090
- Dewey Decimal: 813/.54 22
- LC Class: PS3561.I4813 A89 2006
- Preceded by: Night Work

The Art of Detection is the fifth book in the Kate Martinelli series by Laurie R. King. It is preceded by Night Work. It features elements of the Sherlock Holmes character who appears in King's Mary Russell series.

== Plot summary ==
Philip Gilbert, the head of a group of Sherlock Holmes enthusiasts, is found dead in a national park's artillery battery. Because the autopsy report is slow-coming, inspector Kate Martinelli and her partner Al Hawkin treat the death as a murder case. She can discover little about the dead man aside from his unrelenting fascination with all things Holmes. One of his dinner group companions, Ian Nicholson, reveals that he had discovered a "lost" Holmes story, possibly by Sir Arthur Conan Doyle, about the murder of a gay soldier in 1920s San Francisco. Kate's interest is piqued when Ian mentions that Gilbert's body was discovered under the same circumstance as the soldier's in the story.

Eventually, Kate traces Gilbert's ex-wife and learns that it is likely Gilbert was gay, given that he had been with an actor several years before. She connects him with Nicholson, who used to be an actor and whose own ex-wife admits he is gay. Kate questions Nicholson, who admits that he hit Gilbert with a heavy bottle of wine after Gilbert announced they would have to break up temporarily following the publishing of the lost manuscript. He did not realize at the time that Gilbert actually died of complications following the attack, thereby downgrading the legal status from homicide to manslaughter. Finding Gilbert dead, Nicholson panics and dumps the body then sets up an elaborate alibi. After confessing his actions to Kate, Nicholson commits suicide by cop.

== Characters in The Art of Detection ==
- Kate Martinelli
- Lee Cooper
- Nora
- Al Hawkin
- Philip Gilbert
- Ian Nicholson
