= Pirate King (novel) =

Novel by Laurie R. King

- First edition (US)
- Author: Laurie R. King
- Cover artist: Joe Montgomery
- Language: English
- Series: Mary Russell
- Genre: Detective fiction
- Publisher: Bantam Books (US); Allison & Busby (UK)
- Publication date: 2011
- Publication place: United States
- Media type: Print (hardback)
- Pages: 304
- ISBN: 978-0-7490-4091-8
- LC Class: PS3561.I4813 P57 2011
- Preceded by: The God of the Hive
- Followed by: Garment of Shadows

Pirate King is a 2011 mystery novel by American author Laurie R. King. Eleventh in the Mary Russell series, the story features married detectives Mary Russell and Sherlock Holmes.

Sent to Lisbon and Morocco, where British studio Fflytte Films are creating a silent film version of The Pirates of Penzance, undercover Mary Russell investigates a series of crimes targeting the production and confronts a high-stakes situation when actual pirates orchestrate a hostage situation.
