= The Beekeeper's Apprentice =

First book in the Mary Russell series by Laurie R. King

- First edition
- Author: Laurie R. King
- Language: English
- Series: Mary Russell
- Genre: Detective fiction
- Publisher: St. Martin's Press
- Publication date: 1994
- Publication place: United States
- Media type: Print (hardback & paperback)
- Pages: 368
- ISBN: 0-312-10423-5
- OCLC: 35195813
- Followed by: A Monstrous Regiment of Women

The Beekeeper's Apprentice, Or On the Segregation of the Queen is the first book in the Mary Russell series by Laurie R. King. It was nominated for the Agatha best novel award and was deemed a Notable Young Adult book by the American Library Association.

In this novel, King presents the first meeting between fifteen-year-old Mary Russell, the young Jewish-American protagonist, and Sherlock Holmes. Their meeting leads to a collaboration between the two, though this first novel focuses primarily on the detective training that Holmes gives to Russell. The series that this novel begins currently stands at twenty novels, with the latest having been published in 2024.

== Plot ==
After losing her family in a tragic motor accident in California, fifteen-year-old Mary Russell goes to live with her aunt in Sussex, England. Wandering the Sussex Downs in April 1915, she literally runs across fifty-four-year-old Sherlock Holmes, who has retired from his London practice and keeps bees. The two become fast friends, Russell finding in Holmes a kindred spirit and steadfast teacher and Holmes finding in Russell a quick mind and a worthy apprentice in the art of detecting. By the time Russell enters Oxford University in the autumn of 1917, she is well-versed in Holmes's methods of disguise, tracking, and deduction.

At Oxford, Russell reads chemistry and theology, immersing herself in the Bodleian Library and participating on the side in the dramatic society and elaborate pranks. Between terms, Russell solves her first cases as Holmes's apprentice, catching a German spy disguised as a neighbor's butler and apprehending a thief who had burgled the local pub. In August 1918, Holmes is consulted on the kidnapping of Jessica Simpson, the American senator's daughter, and brings Russell, elevating her apprenticeship. The pair journey in disguise as gypsies and trace the missing girl into Wales, where Russell takes initiative in rescuing Jessica, who develops a bond with her. However, Jessica's kidnappers are merely hired hands, and they fail to find the mastermind behind the plot. Russell and Holmes emerge from the case with a stronger sense of partnership, having solidified their mutual trust of each other's instincts.

One afternoon in December, Russell returns to her lodgings to find Holmes, injured from a bomb and having defused another one set at Russell's door. A third fails to kill Dr. Watson. Their mysterious opponent stalks Russell and Holmes by savaging their cab and leaving a puzzling series of slashes on the cab seat. They deduce she is a formidable woman who knows Holmes's methods thoroughly and has infiltrated some of his secure boltholes in London. Faced with a powerful opponent, Holmes elects to frustrate her by leaving England entirely with Russell. The pair set off for Palestine for six weeks on a mission with two of Mycroft's spies (this interlude becomes the focus of King's later novel O Jerusalem).

Upon their return, Russell and Holmes embark on a charade of estrangement from each other, hoping that Holmes's vulnerability will draw their enemy in for the kill. However, playing the part takes a toll on both. They are also under heavy surveillance by the enemy and unable to converse frankly. In May, Russell discovers that the slashes on the cab seat spell MORIARTY in Roman numerals according to Base 8, and connects the case with her missing maths tutor, Patricia Donleavy, who had given her exercises in Base 8. At her lodgings, she finds Holmes, who informs her that their attacker is preparing to strike. The two make for Sussex to set a trap, only to find Donleavy already lying in wait for them. Donleavy reveals herself as the orchestrator of Jessica Simpson's kidnapping and the revenge-seeking daughter of Professor Moriarty, whom Holmes hurled to his death at the Reichenbach Falls. Holmes provokes her to attack him, and Russell intervenes, leading to a struggle in which Donleavy is killed and Russell is heavily injured by the same bullet.

During her long recovery, Russell sinks into depression due to the heavy emotional toll of the estrangement from Holmes as well as Donleavy's betrayal, as a figure of authority she had trusted. A letter from Jessica Simpson provides some catharsis, causing Russell to revive her partnership with Holmes.

== Reception ==
Feminist scholar Lillian Doherty calls The Beekeeper's Apprentice "vivid and highly entertaining", saying her strong identification with the character of Mary Russell produced a temporary enhancement of her own sense of competence.

== BBC Radio adaptation ==
In 2000 The Beekeeper's Apprentice was adapted as a 4-part BBC radio dramatization starring Monica Dolan as Russell, James Fox as Holmes and Sian Thomas as Donleavy. Shaun Prendergast, who wrote the adaptation also appeared as Watson.
