= With Child =

1996 novel by Laurie R. King

- Author: Laurie R. King
- Language: English
- Series: Kate Martinelli series
- Publisher: St. Martin's Press
- Publication date: Feb 1996
- Publication place: United States
- Media type: Print (Hardback & Paperback)
- Pages: 275
- ISBN: 0-312-14077-0
- OCLC: 36833772
- Preceded by: To Play the Fool
- Followed by: Night Work

With Child is the third novel in the Kate Martinelli series by Laurie R. King. In the book, a teenaged girl is kidnapped while she was supposed to be in Kate's care. With Child is preceded by To Play the Fool and followed by Night Work. The book was nominated for an Edgar Allan Poe Award.

== Plot summary ==
The stepchild of Kate's coworker Al Hawkin asks Kate to help her find her homeless friend Dio, who has mysteriously vanished. They become friends during the process, although Kate is wounded and decides to take a rest. She invites Jules on a trip to visit her lover Lee. On the way, Jules disappears. Kate realizes that Jules has been kidnapped by her biological father, recently freed from prison. The novel ends with Kate going undercover to the father's house and rescuing her.
