= Mary Russell (character) =

Sherlock Holmes character created in 1994

Mary Judith Russell
- First appearance: The Beekeeper's Apprentice (1994)
- Created by: Laurie R. King
- Portrayed by: Monica Dolan

In-universe information
- Gender: Female
- Title: Miss Russell
- Occupation: detective, theologian
- Family: Granddaughter (by marriage to Holmes) Estelle Adler; stepson Damien Adler.
- Spouse: Sherlock Holmes
- Relatives: Father Charles Russell; Mother Judith Klein; Younger brother, Levi (deceased); An anonymous aunt and her son; others simply referred to as "relatives".
- Nationality: British

Mary Russell is a fictional character and the protagonist of the Mary Russell & Sherlock Holmes mystery series by American author Laurie R. King. She first appears in the novel The Beekeeper's Apprentice.

Written over a period of over three decades, King's novels are portrayals of a succession of memoirs written and compiled apparently by an aged Mary Russell. A fictional note from the editor (and signed by King) tells readers of a mysterious occurrence wherein a collection of written accounts was anonymously delivered to the unsuspecting novelist; the note ends with a plea for information from anyone with information on the identity of Mary Russell.

The stories are set between 1915 and the late 1920s, mainly in Britain but extending to Palestine, North India, the United States, Japan, France, the Netherlands, Portugal, Morocco, Italy, and Romania. They begin in Sussex, England, when 15-year-old Mary Russell (born 2 January 1900) meets a man in his mid-50s who she realizes is Sherlock Holmes, the famous detective of Baker Street, now retired to the country and beekeeping as a hobby. Holmes remains throughout the series as a secondary main character, first as Russell's mentor and father figure, and later as her husband and detecting partner. Laurie R. King said of her choice of protagonist, "I did not write Sherlock Holmes stories, I wrote Mary Russell stories".

Most of the novels are first-person, with Locked Rooms, The Language of Bees and God of the Hive being exceptions, with long passages written in third-person. This technique also serves to underscore and solidify themes in the first two novels. The third, God of the Hive (2010) is primarily written with Mary’s first-person narrative, but included various third-person narratives of several characters.

Books 1, 2, and 5 cover seven years of Mary’s life from age 15 to 21, while later books in the series take place between ages 21 through 27. In Castle Shade, she is 25 years old.

In 2000, Monica Dolan starred as Russell in a 4-part BBC Radio drama of The Beekeeper's Apprentice, with James Fox playing Holmes.

== Appearances ==
Beekeeping for Beginners is a novella released in 2011 that introduces new fans to the series. Mary Russell Companion is a compendium released on May 1, 2014 that introduces new fans to the fictional character.

1. The Beekeeper's Apprentice opens in early April 1915, about eight months after the opening of the First World War, when young Mary Russell stumbles, literally, across retired detective Sherlock Holmes on the Sussex or South Downs. Russell impresses Holmes with her powers of deduction, and he begins to train her informally as his protégé. She takes on increasing responsibilities. The training becomes vitally important when Russell is caught up in an old enemy's vendetta against Holmes. The volume closes in August 1919.
2. A Monstrous Regiment of Women takes place from Christmas 1920 to February 1921. Russell becomes involved in a Christian feminist movement concerned with philanthropy and political activism. When three wealthy followers are found to have died under mysterious circumstances after willing their fortunes to the cause, Russell and Holmes are drawn into a deeper mystery. A sub-plot deals with the deepening relationship between Russell and Holmes. The title is a reference to the 16th century pamphlet The First Blast of the Trumpet Against the Monstruous Regiment of Women.
3. A Letter of Mary is set two years after the events of Monstrous Regiment and the Holmes-Russell marriage. It begins in August 1923 and concludes a month later. A first-century manuscript surfaces that would turn Christianity on its ear, and its discoverer, a friend of Russell and Holmes, turns up dead. While they investigate the death, they must also evade those who are looking for the manuscript.
4. The Moor closely follows its predecessor, from end September or early October 1923 until early November 1923. It takes the partnership out to Dartmoor, the location of the Conan Doyle mystery, The Hound of the Baskervilles. Another hound is stalking the night, and they must discover how and why. Russell meets Holmes' old acquaintance, the real-life Rev. Sabine Baring-Gould, the squire of Lew Trenchard, when he asks their help in ridding the Moor of the ghostly hound.
5. O Jerusalem returns to the close of 1918 and recounts in greater detail the couple's six-week sojourn to Palestine which was glossed over in The Beekeeper's Apprentice. Working with two of Mycroft's agents, Mahmoud and Ali Hazr, the partners seek out spies in post-World War I Palestine.
6. Justice Hall takes up immediately following the conclusion of The Moor, and covers events to Christmas 1923. Two friends reappear in England, their former lives now revealed. They are brought back to the life they left behind by a sudden succession to a dukedom. Russell and Holmes help search for one of the Duke's nephews, so he can pass on the coronet and return to his preferred life abroad. While there, the pair dig into the past to discover the truth behind the Duke's other nephew's mysterious wartime death.
7. The Game In the early days of 1924, Russell and Holmes are given an urgent task by his brother Mycroft: to find a British spy gone missing along India's northwest frontier, where men are dying and trouble is brewing. The spy is one whom Holmes knows from his travels in India long ago, under the name Sigurson - Kimball O'Hara, known to the world by the name Rudyard Kipling called him, Kim.
8. Locked Rooms Setting sail from their adventures in India during the spring of 1924, Mary Russell and Sherlock Holmes first visit Japan and then turn their faces toward San Francisco. The time has come to close up the house and business interests she inherited on the death of her family, ten years before. But disturbing dreams and painful memories make the visit more difficult than she expected, and Holmes suspects that there are dark secrets in his wife's past that even she is not aware of. A young Dashiell Hammett makes an extended cameo appearance.
9. The Language of Bees Mary Russell and Sherlock Holmes return home to the Sussex coast in August 1924 and find an entire colony of Holmes' bees has disappeared, but soon have a bigger mystery to solve. They are enlisted to find the missing wife and child of Damian Adler, whom they crossed paths with earlier when he was accused of murder. As their investigation brings the couple into contact with many different types of madness, Russell begins to believe that Holmes may be protecting the killer they are after.
10. The God of the Hive The adventure picks up directly from the previous book's cliff-hanger ending, as Russell, Holmes, and their companions have been forced to split up in an attempt to make their way back to London, and safety. However, the world has become a dangerous and uncertain place in their absence, with deadly conspiracy so deeply entrenched in the highest echelons of government that even Mycroft is prevented from rendering assistance. New foes threaten the company at all sides, yet in the process a modern-day Robin Goodfellow emerges to lend aid to Mary and her kin.
11. Pirate King Set in the autumn of 1924, a few months after the previous four books. Mary Russell is now 24, and her husband, the retired consulting detective, is in his early 60s, but retains excellent general health, both physically and mentally. Mary Russell is persuaded ("inveigled" may be a more apt word) by her brother-in-law Mycroft into infiltrating an English silent-film company suspected of having criminal sidelines. In an undercover role, she - assisted by Holmes, of course - joins the film crew in Portugal on its latest grand project, a silent-film version of Gilbert and Sullivan's "Pirates of Penzance"- but with real pirates.
12. Garment of Shadows At the end of 1924, Mary Russell and her husband Sherlock Holmes are separated by a shocking circumstance in a perilous part of the world, each racing against time to prevent an explosive catastrophe that could clothe them both in shrouds. In a strange room in Morocco, Mary Russell is trying to solve a pressing mystery: Who am I? She has awakened with shadows in her mind, blood on her hands, and soldiers pounding at the door. Meanwhile, Holmes is pulled by two old friends and a distant relation into the growing war between France, Spain, and the Rif Revolt led by Emir Abd el-Krim - who may be a North African Robin Hood, or simply a power-mad chieftain. The shadows of war are drawing over the ancient city of Fez and as Holmes searches for Russell, and Russell searches for herself, each tries to crack deadly parallel puzzles before it's too late for them, for Africa, and for the peace of Europe.
13. Dreaming Spies Takes place between the events of The Game and Locked Rooms. After a lengthy case in India (The Game) Mary Russell and Sherlock Holmes are on the steamer Thomas Carlyle, bound for Japan. Though they’re not the vacationing types, Russell is looking forward to a change of focus—not to mention the chance of traveling to a place Holmes has not visited before. Aboard the ship, intrigue stirs almost immediately. Between an aristocrat Holmes suspects of being a blackmailer and the lithe young Japanese woman who befriends Russell, the couple have plenty to keep their minds occupied. From the Imperial Palace in Tokyo to Oxford’s venerable Bodleian Library, Russell and Holmes race to solve a mystery with enormous implications of international extortion, espionage, and shocking secrets that, if revealed, could spark revolution—and topple an empire.
14. The Murder of Mary Russell Focuses on Mrs Hudson's story and how her past comes back to haunt Russell and Holmes.
15. Mary Russell's War, and other stories of suspense is a collection of short stories set at various times.
16. Island of the Mad Set in June 1925, directly after The Murder of Mary Russell, and takes Russell and Holmes to Venice tracking a missing woman.
17. Riviera Gold Set in the summer of 1925, Russell and Holmes happen arrive at the Côte d'Azur and find themselves pulled between the young and the old, hot sun and cool jazz, new friendships and old loyalties.
18. Castle Shade Set in 1925, Russell and Holmes come to the aid of Queen Marie of Roumania, granddaughter to Queen Victoria.
19. The Lantern's Dance Set in 1925, Russell and Holmes look forward to spending time with the famous artist Damian Adler, and his family in the French countryside.
20. Knave of Diamonds Set in 1925, Russell reunites with her long-lost paternal uncle, Jake, and his connection with the theft of Irish Crown Jewels.

== Biography ==
=== Early life ===
The daughter of a British Jewish mother and an American millionaire father, Russell spent time in Boston and San Francisco as well as England while growing up. Her mother raised her in the Jewish tradition and she continues to consider herself a Jew as an adult. When she is fourteen, Russell's parents and younger brother are killed in an automobile accident outside San Francisco in which she herself is seriously injured. Russell blames herself for the accident and undergoes psychoanalysis during her recovery, continuing to have nightmares for years afterward. After she recovers, Russell returns to her mother's farm in Sussex under the guardianship of her much-hated and penurious maternal aunt, who intends to live well off Russell's fortune until Mary reaches her majority. It is here where, as well as meeting Holmes, Russell prepares for, and eventually passes, the entrance exams to Oxford University, where she reads chemistry and theology.

=== Relationships ===
In addition to Holmes, who acts a mentor and father substitute early in their relationship and eventually becomes her husband, Russell becomes close to other characters from the Holmes canon: she considers Mrs. Hudson, who has accompanied Holmes to Sussex as his housekeeper, to be a mother figure, and she refers to Dr. Watson as "Uncle John" and Mycroft Holmes as "Brother Mycroft." She is also close to her farm manager Patrick and tends to make friends easily when she wants to.

Russell also encounters a number of historical figures and fictional characters (who are treated as "real" within the novels) over the course of her adventures. In addition to meetings with Rudyard Kipling's Kim, Dashiell Hammett, and Sabine Baring-Gould as described above, she has met T. E. Lawrence, J. R. R. Tolkien and Edmund Allenby. She and Holmes are also implied to be friends with fellow fictional detective Peter Wimsey, who makes a cameo appearance in A Letter of Mary.

=== Skills and physical attributes ===
Russell has a keen mind and is an ardent feminist. She is a serious scholar in theology and works on a book-length manuscript, which is published. She reads and speaks many modern and classical languages, including Ancient Greek and Latin (learned for her theology degree), Hebrew, French, German, Spanish, Arabic, and Hindi. She studies the Japanese language and culture in preparation for a trip.

Under Holmes's tutelage she has developed a variety of unlikely talents. She has extremely accurate aim with firearms, throwing knives, and even rocks. She can play the tin whistle, juggle, do sleight-of-hand, pick locks, and hypnotize others. She can ride, drive, and is well schooled in martial arts - particularly in the art of falling without being hurt. She has exceptional balance and strong climbing skills. She is an adequate, but not gifted, cook, although she is skilled at making Turkish coffee. She is well read and spends a great deal of time out of doors in the course of her investigations, but she is not a naturalist.

Like her husband, Russell is tall (5"11") and slim, with blonde hair and blue eyes. She is not a naturally tidy person and is easily disheveled - a disadvantage for someone who is frequently sleuthing in wet, mucky, or dirty locales, then forced to make a drawing room appearance. She is quite unconventional - not a surprise for a young woman who married an older famous eccentric. She prefers trousers and functional clothes, although often dons the traditional tweed skirts and sensible shoes of a female British naturalist.

She only rarely accepts the title "Mrs. Holmes" and goes by her given name "Mary Russell", which she uses with the title "Miss" (i.e., "Miss Russell"). She wears a gold band on her right hand. This makes her status ambiguous - people she meets may think she is wearing a ring for sentimental reasons, or perhaps that she is married but from another culture, but most likely that she is one of the many women widowed during World War I. She wears her hair long, until it is cropped for a disguise in The Game.

She is very nearsighted, which can be an irritation on a case. She is often concerned that her somewhat delicate wire frame glasses will crack (though she does not carry a spare pair) and is frequently hampered when they fog up or are spattered with rain. She is able to cope with the uglier side of her profession but is shaken by violence, death, and corpses. She enjoys hot baths, sleeping late, and reading. She dislikes the harshness of electric lights.

== Inspiration ==
Laurie R. King has described Russell as "what Sherlock Holmes would look like if Holmes, the Victorian detective, were (a) a woman, (b) of the Twentieth century, and (c) interested in theology". King has a graduate degree in Old Testament theology that has doubtless informed Russell's own theological pursuits.
