= The Game (King novel) =

2004 novel by Laurie R. King

- First edition (US)
- Author: Laurie R. King
- Language: English
- Series: Mary Russell
- Genre: Detective fiction
- Publisher: Bantam Books (US); Allison & Busby (UK)
- Publication date: 2004
- Publication place: United States
- Media type: Print (hardback & paperback)
- Pages: 400
- ISBN: 0-553-80194-5
- OCLC: 52948593
- Dewey Decimal: 813/.54 22
- LC Class: PS3561.I4813 G36 2004
- Preceded by: Justice Hall
- Followed by: Locked Rooms

The Game is the seventh book in the Mary Russell series by Laurie R. King, which focuses on the adventures of Russell and her partner and, later, husband, an aging Sherlock Holmes.

The author's website includes an excerpt from the first chapter.

== Timeline ==
The events in the book take place between January and March 1924, starting a few weeks after the events of Justice Hall.

== Plot ==
Mary Russell and Sherlock Holmes are visited by Sherlock's gravely ill brother, Mycroft, who has an intriguing case for them. Mycroft, who has connections in the highest levels of the government, has just received a strange package: An oilskin-wrapped packet containing the papers of a missing English spy named Kimball O'Hara.

Mary quickly realises that this is the same Kimball who served as the inspiration for the famous Rudyard Kipling novel, an orphaned English boy turned loose in India, whose cunning he used to spy for the Crown. But now, he has inexplicably gone missing. Mycroft fears that he may have been taken hostage or even killed. When Russell learns of that Holmes knew Kim thirty years before, she knows the die is cast: she will accompany her husband to India to search for the missing operative.

En route, they encounter the insufferable Tom Goodheart—a wealthy young American who has embraced Communism—traveling with his mother and sister to visit his maharaja friend, Jumalpandra ("Jimmy"), an impossibly rich and charming ruler of the (fictional) Indian state of Khanpur. Even before they arrive, danger shows its face in everything from a suspicious passenger on board their steamer to an "accident" that very nearly claims their lives.

With some local intelligence supplied by Geoffrey Nesbit, an English agent taught by Kim, and accompanied by Bindra, a resourceful orphan, the couple travel incognito as native magicians. Ultimately, their journey intersects with the paths of the Goodhearts, Jimmy, and the enigmatic Kim. While in India, Russell learns that it is often impossible to tell friend from foe, and that some games must be played out until their deadly end.
