= Justice Hall (novel) =

2002 book by Laurie R. King

- First edition
- Author: Laurie R. King
- Language: English
- Series: Mary Russell
- Genre: Detective fiction
- Publisher: Bantam Books
- Publication date: 2002
- Publication place: United States
- Media type: Print (hardback & paperback)
- Pages: 352
- ISBN: 0553381717
- Preceded by: O Jerusalem
- Followed by: The Game

Justice Hall is the sixth book in the Mary Russell series by Laurie R. King.

In this installment, Mary Russell has accepted her tumultuous relationship with her now-husband, Sherlock Holmes and is looking forward to some time alone. However, fate intervenes, and they reunite with their old friends, Ali Hazr and his brother, Mahmoud, now released from their disguise and known as Alistair and Marsh (characters from the previous book O Jerusalem). King blends the original Holmesian myth and a complex modern plot to create another delightful mystery "as intelligent as it is engagingly devious."

For an excerpt of the first chapter, go to Laurie R. King's website.

== Timeline ==
The events in the book take place between November 5 and December 4 of 1923.

== Plot ==
Mary Russell and husband Sherlock Holmes receive a surprise visitor late at night: a much-changed Ali Hazr, one of their Palestinian companions during the events of O Jerusalem (novel) five years ago. Ali asks their help for his brother Mahmoud, and reveals their true aristocratic identities: Mahmoud is actually Lord Maurice "Marsh" Hughenfort, the Seventh Duke of Beauville, and Ali is his cousin, Alistair John Hughenfort.

Ali, Holmes, and Russell travel to Justice Hall, the family seat in Berkshire. After the death of his older brother Henry, Mahmoud (now Marsh) is determined to do his duty as the new duke, remaining in England and abandoning his nomadic life in Palestine. Marsh’s sister Phillida and husband Sidney Darling have been running the estate, and quietly resent Marsh’s return. To free Marsh from Justice Hall, Russell and Holmes investigate the line of succession, focusing on the former heir Gabriel, Henry’s son, who was executed during the war. Russell meets Iris Sutherland, Marsh’s wife, and deduces that Gabriel is in fact their son. Stricken by guilt and doubt over his son’s death, Marsh cannot leave his family in good conscience.

The current heir Thomas, son of Marsh’s brother Lionel, has grown up in France and has never met his Hughenfort family. Marsh also suspects that Lionel did not father Thomas, given Lionel’s “flamboyant” disinterest in women. During a weekend bird shoot, Marsh is injured in what appears an accident, but which Russell et al. believe to be a murder attempt. The Hughenforts sans Marsh meet Thomas and his mother in London, and Ali, Iris, Russell, and Holmes decide that Thomas does not resemble a Hughenfort. Russell and Holmes then follow Thomas and his mother back to Lyon, and discover that Sidney Darling had coached them to ensure continued control over the estate.

In London, Russell and Holmes interview the chaplain in Gabriel Hughenfort’s regiment and find that Gabriel was executed for refusing an order that would have meant the certain death of his men. Before Gabriel’s execution, an unnamed staff major visited him and convinced him to stay quiet to save the family name from shame. Given the chance to play the martyr, Gabriel falls for it and goes quietly to his execution at dawn. The chaplain also passes on Gabriel’s diary, which recounted his courtship with Hélène, a VAD driver with green eyes. Holmes’s records indicate that the staff major could be either Sidney Darling or Ivo Hughenfort, a cousin of Ali’s. Meanwhile, Russell and Iris sail across the Atlantic to Toronto, Canada to find the green-eyed VAD driver, who turns out to be Philippa Helen O’Meary, Gabriel’s lawfully wedded wife, and the mother of their five-year-old son Gabe.

Russell and Iris bring the Canadians to England to meet Marsh and Ali. The family agree unanimously that Gabe is undoubtedly Gabriel’s son and will be the seventh Duke of Beauville. During a fancy-dress ball, Marsh reveals the new Duke, while the others keep an eye on Darling and Ivo Hughenfort. The villain proves to be Ivo, who attempts to kidnap the young Duke and is foiled by Iris, Marsh, Ali, Russell, and Holmes. With the line of succession settled, Marsh reprises his persona as Mahmoud and departs with Ali. In the epilogue, Russell notes that Ivo Hughenfort, while awaiting trial, accidentally drowns in Justice Pond, and no foul play is suspected.

== Reception ==
"Justice Hall opens on a deliciously dark and dreary night. Holmes and Russell have just returned to their snug seaside cottage after yet another hair-raising case, when a pounding at the door interrupts their fireside stupor. The frantic visitor is Ali [Hazr, from O Jerusalem]. Except that Ali turns out to have been masquerading all those years ago in the desert. (Washington Post)

From the opening knock on their door by a wounded visitor to the satisfying denouement, King has again crafted a sterling story." (Publishers Weekly)
