= Locked Rooms =

2005 novel by Laurie R. King

- First edition (US)
- Author: Laurie R. King
- Language: English
- Series: Mary Russell
- Genre: Detective fiction
- Publisher: Bantam Books (US); Allison & Busby (UK)
- Publication date: 2005
- Publication place: United States
- Media type: Print (hardback & paperback)
- ISBN: 0-553-80197-X
- Preceded by: The Game
- Followed by: The Language of Bees

Locked Rooms is the eighth book in the Mary Russell series by Laurie R. King. It was published in 2005. Unlike King's previous Mary Russell novels, Locked Rooms is split into 5 separate "books". The books alternate between the familiar Mary Russell first-person narrative and a third-person narrator following Sherlock Holmes. The events of the novel follow directly that of The Game.

Mary Russell and Sherlock Holmes sail to San Francisco to close up the house and businesses that Mary inherited after her family's death. Throughout her adolescence and adulthood, Mary has blamed herself for the family's fatal automobile accident. A puzzling codicil to the Russells' will, a break-in at the family house, and a failed attempt on Mary's life quickly draw Holmes and eventually Mary into an investigation of the real cause of her parents' death. Holmes and Russell team up with a former Pinkerton agent Dashiell Hammett, several residents of Chinatown, and a cast of irregulars to solve the mystery that has plagued Mary for ten years.

== Plot summary ==
On their way back to Britain from India, Holmes and Russell stop at Russell's childhood home in San Francisco. As they approach San Francisco, Russell becomes more and more distracted. Holmes concludes from this, and her recurring dreams of falling objects, a faceless man, and locked rooms, that she is repressing some unpleasant memory. Russell denies this and tries to track down the psychiatrist who helped her recover from the trauma she suffered when she precipitated the car accident that killed her family. On the way, she meets a Chinese man, Long, who was the son of her parents' good friends. Long saves her from a murder attempt before introducing himself and saying that his own parents were killed shortly after her own parents died. When Russell finally tracks down the name of her psychiatrist, she learns that she was murdered after Russell departed for England several years ago.

Holmes determines from the fact that there was a recent break-in at Russell's house, Russell's anxiety and distraction, the murder of the psychiatrist, and the most recent attempt on Russell's life, that there is something serious amiss. He hires Dashiell Hammett to join his investigation. They conclude that Russell was present during the 1906 San Francisco earthquake, despite her denial of this fact, and it was this experience that produced the dream about falling objects. He learns from an interview with a survivor of the earthquake that Russell was very frightened by a man with several bandages on his face looking for her father — he had covered up his face because he had been burned while fighting a fire, and this made him appear faceless.

Both Russell and Hammett visit the site of the Russell family car accident. Russell then takes a vacation to her family's summer home with her friends Flo and Donny. During the vacation, she recovers her wits enough to realize that somebody is trying to murder her and all the people that could possibly be connected with the car accident that killed her parents, from Long's parents to her psychiatrist. She visits the garage that collected the remainder of her parents' car and learns that the brake rod was cut and she is not to blame for their deaths; they were murdered.

Russell returns to her city house, fully recovered and determined to find out who was behind all the murders. Using fengshui, which Long's family was very interested in, they dig up the garden and find a box with a confession, written by Russell's father, and several valuable items in it. In the letter, he says that he helped a man get away with murder of a policeman, looting, and arson to cover up the evidence during the 1906 earthquake. The man in question was the one posing as a rescuer with the bandaged face. The letter concludes with the statement that Mr. Russell is going to disclose this information in order to free his conscience, and adds that he warned the person responsible of his intentions. The letter was written only days before the family members' deaths.

Holmes had previously set up Irregulars in the form of street kids to spy on Hammett's house in case of an attempt on Hammett's life. They report on a break-in involving the two suspects, the burnt man and his "sister". They end up on a chase that takes them to Chinatown, where one of Long's friends calls on the crowd to prevent them from getting away. Russell confronts the two before they are arrested, and finally unlocks the last "room" — a memory she had of seeing the man near her parents' car the day they died.
