= Laurie R. King =

American author (born 1952)

- Born: September 19, 1952 (age 73); Oakland, California, U.S.
- Education: University of California, Santa Cruz (BA); Graduate Theological Union (MA)
- Occupation: Writer
- Spouse: Noel Quinton King (1977–2009; his death)
- Children: 2
- Writing career
- Pen name: Leigh Richards
- Period: 1993 to Present
- Genre: Detective fiction
- Notable awards: Creasey Memorial (1995); Edgar (1994); Lambda (2007); Macavity (2002); Nero (1996); Agatha (2015)
- Website: laurierking.com

Laurie R. King (born September 19, 1952) is an American author best known for her detective fiction.

== Life and career ==
Born in Oakland, California, King earned a degree in comparative religion from the University of California, Santa Cruz in 1977 and a masters in theology from the Graduate Theological Union in 1984, where her thesis was on "Feminine Aspects of Yahweh". She later received an honorary doctorate from the Church Divinity School of the Pacific in Berkeley, California.

Among King's books are the Mary Russell series of historical mysteries, featuring Sherlock Holmes as her mentor and later partner, and a series featuring Kate Martinelli, a lesbian police officer in San Francisco. Using the pseudonym "Leigh Richards", she has published a science fiction novel, Califia's Daughters (2004). Across those genres, she explores several humanist themes including the effects of war on soldiers as they attempt to find their place when returning home. This is seen in several of the Mary Russell novels and has been described in a comparison of the detectives in Keeping Watch (2003) and Touchstone (2007).

She lives in Watsonville, California, in the hills above Monterey Bay, southeast of Santa Cruz. From 1977 until his death in early 2009, she was married to the historian Noel Quinton King. They are the parents of two children.

== Awards ==
King's first book, A Grave Talent (1993), received the 1994 Edgar Award for Best First Novel and a 1995 John Creasey Memorial Award. This was followed by the 1996 Nero Award for A Monstrous Regiment of Women, the 2002 Macavity Award for Best Novel for Folly, the 2007 Lambda Award for Best Lesbian Mystery for The Art of Detection, and the 2015 Agatha Award for Best Historical Novel for Dreaming Spies. She has also been nominated for two Anthonys, a Barry, two additional Edgars, another Macavity, an Orange Prize, and four RT Reviewers' Choice Awards. In 2022, she won the Edgar Award's 'Grand Master' for her work.

She was inducted into membership of The Baker Street Irregulars in 2010.

== Works ==
=== Kate Martinelli mysteries ===
- A Grave Talent (1993) ISBN 0-312-08804-3
- To Play the Fool (1995) ISBN 0-312-11907-0
- With Child (1996) ISBN 0-312-14077-0
- Night Work (2000) ISBN 0-553-10713-5
- The Art of Detection (2006) ISBN 0-553-80453-7 (Lambda Literary Award 2006)
- Beginnings (2019) ISBN 9781732464728

=== Mary Russell and Sherlock Holmes mysteries ===
- The Beekeeper's Apprentice (1994) ISBN 0-312-10423-5
- A Monstrous Regiment of Women (1995) ISBN 0-312-13565-3
- A Letter of Mary (1997) ISBN 0-312-14670-1
- The Moor (1998) ISBN 0-312-16934-5
- O Jerusalem (1999) ISBN 0-553-11093-4
  (although written fifth in sequence, the events in this book take place during the latter part of those described in The Beekeeper's Apprentice)
- Justice Hall (2002) ISBN 0-553-11113-2
- The Game (2004) ISBN 0-553-80194-5
- Locked Rooms (2005) ISBN 0-553-80197-X
- The Language of Bees (2009) ISBN 0-553-80454-5
- The God of the Hive (2010) ISBN 0-553-80554-1
- Beekeeping for Beginners (an ebook novella) (2011) ISBN 978-0-7490-4059-8
  (This short story describes the early events of The Beekeeper's Apprentice from the point of view of Sherlock Holmes. The novella is included in Garment of Shadows ISBN 978-0-7490-1377-6 and in Mary Russell's War And Other Stories of Suspense (2016) ISBN 978-1-4642-0733-4)
- Pirate King (2011) ISBN 0-553-80798-6
- Garment of Shadows (2012) ISBN 978-0-7490-1377-6
- Dreaming Spies (2015) ISBN 978-0-3455-3179-7
  (although written thirteenth in sequence, the events in this book take place between those described in The Game and Locked Rooms)
- The Marriage of Mary Russell (March 15, 2016. The short story is included in Mary Russell's War And Other Stories of Suspense (2016) ISBN 978-1-4642-0733-4.)
- The Murder of Mary Russell (April 5, 2016) ISBN 978-0804177900
- Mary Russell's War And Other Stories of Suspense (2016) ISBN 978-1-4642-0733-4
  contains 10 short stories.
- Island of the Mad (2018) ISBN 978-0-804-17796-2
- Riviera Gold (2020) ISBN 978-0-525-62083-9
- Castle Shade (2021) ISBN 978-0525620860
- The Lantern's Dance (2024) ISBN 978-0-593-49659-6
- Knave of Diamonds (2025) ISBN 978-0-593-87398-4

=== Harris Stuyvesant and Bennett Grey series ===
(Historical novels of suspense, featuring FBI agent Harris Stuyvesant and injured British soldier Bennett Grey)

- Touchstone (2007) ISBN 978-0-553-80355-6
- The Bones of Paris (2013) ISBN 978-0-7490-1587-9

=== Non-series books ===
- A Darker Place [UK title: The Birth of a New Moon] (1999) ISBN 978-0-553-57824-9
- Folly (2001) ISBN 978-0-553-38151-1
- Keeping Watch (2003) ISBN 978-0-553-38252-5
- Califia's Daughters (as Leigh Richards) (2004) - science fiction. ISBN 978-0-553-58667-1
- Lockdown (2017) ISBN 978-0-804-17793-1
- Back to the Garden (2022) ISBN 978-0-593-49656-5
