= O Jerusalem (novel) =

1999 novel by Laurie R. King

- First edition
- Author: Laurie R. King
- Language: English
- Series: Mary Russell
- Genre: Detective fiction
- Publisher: Bantam Books
- Publication date: 1999
- Publication place: United States
- Media type: Print (hardback & paperback)
- ISBN: 0-553-11093-4
- OCLC: 40595330
- Dewey Decimal: 813/.54 21
- LC Class: PS3561.I4813 O15 1999
- Preceded by: The Moor
- Followed by: Justice Hall

O Jerusalem is the fifth book in the Mary Russell series by Laurie R. King.

Set during the voyage of Mary Russell and Sherlock Holmes to the Holy Land, the action of this novel takes place chronologically during the action of The Beekeeper's Apprentice. In Palestine Mary and Sherlock meet up with Mahmoud and Ali Hazr, two apparently Bedouin guides, to counter a plot against the British in Jerusalem under General Edmund Allenby.

== Brief character overview ==
Mary Russell: She is nineteen, and currently on a break from studying theology at Oxford University. During the escapade, she is dressed as a young Bedouin man and must learn the Arabic language on the go. She keeps throwing knives in her boots and has excellent aim.

Sherlock Holmes: The aging detective has recently had his back badly hurt in The Beekeeper's Apprentice. He visited Palestine previously, and so already has experience with the customs and language, to a certain degree.

Mahmoud Hazr: He works as a traveling scribe, which covers up that he and Ali are British spies. He has a scar on his face from being previously tortured. He is taciturn and is described as being as steady as a rock.

Ali Hazr-: He is Mahmoud's younger brother, and dresses very flamboyantly. He uses a large unwieldy knife for everything, including carving small wooden figures. He has excellent night vision, and is said to have, “Eyes like a cat.” He is highly distrustful of Holmes and Russell when they first come.

Joshua: He is a spymaster, whom the Hazrs report to. He collects reports from a small shack outside of Beersheva. He was in France fighting in the trenches for six months during World War I and works for the British Empire.
