= History of the San Francisco Police Department =

The San Francisco Police Department began operations on August 13, 1849, during the California Gold Rush in San Francisco, California, under the command of Captain Malachi Fallon.

The police department was created –along the Chilean consulate in San Francisco– following the attack of The Hounds gang on the Little Chile neighbourhood (Spanish: Chilecito).

== History ==
At the time of founding on August 13, 1849, Chief Malachi Fallon had a force of one deputy captain, three sergeants, and thirty officers.

In 1851, Albert Bernard de Russailh wrote about the nascent San Francisco police force:

As for the police, I have only one thing to say. The police force is largely made up of ex-bandits, and naturally the members are interested above all in saving their old friends from punishment. Policemen here are quite as much to be feared as the robbers; if they know you have money, they will be the first to knock you on the head. You pay them well to watch over your house, and they set it on fire. In short, I think that all the people concerned with justice or the police are in league with the criminals. The city is in a hopeless chaos, and many years must pass before order can be established. In a country where so many races are mingled, a severe and inflexible justice is desirable, which would govern with an iron hand.

On October 28, 1853, the Board of Aldermen passed Ordinance No. 466, which provided for the reorganization of the police department. Sections one and two provided as follows:

The People of the City of San Francisco do ordain as follows:

Sec. 1. The Police Department of the City of San Francisco, shall be composed of a day and night police, consisting of 56 men (including a Captain and assistant Captain), each to be recommended by at least ten tax-paying citizens.

Sec. 2. There shall be one Captain and one assistant Captain of Police, who shall be elected in joint convention of the Board of Aldermen and assistant Aldermen. The remainder of the force, viz., 54 men, shall be appointed as follows: By the Mayor, 2; by the City Marshal, 2; by the City Recorder, 2; and by the Aldermen and assistant Aldermen, 3 each.

In July 1856, the "Consolidation Act" went into effect. This act abolished the office of City Marshal and created in its stead the office of Chief of Police. The first Chief of Police elected in 1856 was James F. Curtis a former member of the San Francisco Committee of Vigilance.

In early August 1975, the SFPD went on strike over a pay dispute, violating a California law prohibiting police from striking. The city quickly obtained a court order declaring the strike illegal and enjoining the SFPD back to work. The court messenger delivering the order was met with violence and the SFPD continued to strike. Only managers and African-American officers remained on duty, with 45 officers and three fire trucks responsible for a city population of 700,000. Supervisor Dianne Feinstein pleaded Mayor Joseph Alioto to ask Governor Jerry Brown to call out the National Guard to patrol the streets, but Alioto refused. When enraged civilians confronted SFPD officers at the picket lines, the officers arrested them. The strike was joined by the city's firefighters. The ACLU obtained a court order prohibiting strikers from carrying their service revolvers. Again, the SFPD ignored the court order. On August 20, a bomb detonated at the Mayor's home with a sign reading "Don't Threaten Us" left on his lawn. On August 21, Mayor Alioto advised the San Francisco Board of Supervisors that they should concede to the strikers' demands. The Supervisors unanimously refused. Mayor Alioto immediately then declared a state of emergency, assumed legislative powers, and granted the strikers' demands. City Supervisors and taxpayers sued but the court found that a contract obtained through an illegal strike is still legally enforceable.

In 1997, the San Francisco International Airport Police merged with SFPD, becoming the SFPD Airport Bureau.

On September 8, 2011, ground was broken for San Francisco's new Public Safety Building (PSB) in Mission Bay. A replacement facility for the San Francisco Police Department (SFPD) Headquarters and Southern District Police Station located at 850 Bryant, the PSB also contained a fire station to serve the burgeoning neighborhood. The building was completed in 2015.

The first African American police officer on SFPD in the 19th-century was Edward Dennis, the son of George Washington Dennis. In 2014, the San Francisco Police academy graduated its first publicly reported transgender police officer, Mikayla Connell.

== List of key events in the history of the SFPD ==
=== 1850–1875 ===
- 1851 and 1856: The San Francisco Vigilance Movement usurped local and state authority during the post-Gold Rush period.
- 1861: Confederate privateer, the schooner J. M. Chapman captured in San Francisco bay by federal agents and San Francisco Police
- January 1866: Author Mark Twain blasts the SFPD and Chief Martin Burke for corruption in a series of letters to the editor, including one to the Virginia City Territorial Enterprise, now lost but parts of which were reprinted elsewhere, published January 23, 1866.

=== 1875–1900 ===
- From 1875 to 1888: Hunt for Charles Bolles, known as "Black Bart", a notorious stagecoach robber at the time. He was eventually caught by a Wells Fargo detective James B. Hume. He disappeared shortly after he was released from prison in 1888.
- April 26, 1877: Substitute Officer Charles J. Coots killed by gunfire.
- 1877: The "July Days" rioting of 1877 that broke out as an indirect result of an earlier demonstration in solidarity with striking miners in Pittsburgh, Pennsylvania, where at least forty strikers had been killed by state militia. City fathers established a committee of safety to supplement the police force, handing out axe handles that gave the group the moniker, the "pick-handle" brigade.
- Early 1880s: Chinatown Squad established.
- February 16, 1884, Officer John Nicholson killed by stabbing.
- 1886: C. W. Armanger requested a seven-point star for police badges, to represent the seven seals in the Book of Revelation of the new testament for virtue, divinity, prudence, fortitude, honor, glory, and praise of God. The first SF policeman to wear the star was Isaiah W. Lees. It was worn on the left breast.
- November 1886: Police defend old Jail on Broadway in North Beach from vigilantes bent on lynching prisoners.
- December 17, 1886: Officer Edwin J. Osgood killed by stabbing.
- September 11, 1891: Officer Alexander G. Grant killed by gunfire.
- April 13, 1895: Theodore Durrant was arrested for murdering both Minnie Williams and Blanche Lamont in Emanuel Church in Noe Valley San Francisco. Hanged in 1898.
- September 15, 1895: Detective Daniel Coffee commits suicide by gun at home.
- November 9, 1895, a troop of twenty officers from the southern district, under the command of Captain John Spillane, march down sixth street late at night, burn the shanties at Dumpville, evict the scavengers from the site which is quickly filled to be used as part of the huge southern Pacific railroad yards along Channel Street.
- March 23, 1896, Lieutenant William L. Burke killed by gunfire.

=== 1900–1925 ===
- May 3, 1901: The San Francisco Call reports; Chief William P. Sullivan issues order against officers dyeing hair and whiskers, claiming the effort detracts from the officer's duties.
- 1901: Carman's strikes. Employers' Association hired toughs and Mayor James D. Phelan's police attack strikers. City police ride with scabs. Police beat strikers but make no arrests. Police behavior during this strike is a major factor in the fall Mayoral election which brought Eugene Schmitz, his patron Abe Ruef, and the Union Labor Party to power. 5 dead, 300 injured.
- January 21, 1902, Officer Eugene C. Robinson killed by gunfire.
- April 18, 1906, Officer Max Fenner killed by natural disaster.
- April 16, 1906; The first Hall of Justice on Kearney Street opposite Portsmouth Square was damaged in the earthquake and fire.
- 1906:Hall of Justice, opposite Portsmouth Square on Kearney Street, rebuilt after earthquake.
- September 6, 1906, Officer James S. Cook killed by gunfire.
- November 16, 1906, Officer George P. O'Connell killed by gunfire.
- September 3, 1907, Officer Edward T. McCartney killed by gunfire.
- 1907: First police car inaugurated. Among the first police departments to use fingerprints as a means of identification.
- 1907: San Francisco Streetcar Strike: Disagreements between the union and the management of United Railroads Company from 1902 to 1907 contribute greatly to this strike. Strike ends in failure as workers abandoned the strike.
- December 1, 1908: San Francisco Chief of Police William J. Biggy went overboard from a police launch during a nighttime crossing of San Francisco Bay after a visit with judge in Tiburon, California. Biggy had been accused of failing to stop the killing, or suicide in jail, of ex-convict and alleged Ruef bagman Morris Haas, shooter of special prosecutor Francis J. Heney. Biggy's body was found two weeks later. The Coroner's Jury returned a verdict of accidental death although some people believed his death was suicide. The case remains unsolved.
- 1909: Establishment of SFPD motorcycle squad for "stopping scorchers (bicyclists) and reckless vehicle drivers" and countries first fingerprint bureau.
- 1912: Warned by Chinese Consul General Li Yung Yow that "efforts to bring a truce among warring highbinder factions" had been futile, police chief David A. White issues orders that the regular Chinatown squad be expanded ... and all officers be instructed to "shoot to kill" at the first indication of trouble."
- 1913: Three women protective officers join the force. San Francisco among first departments to hire women.
- May 4, 1913: Officer Byron C. Wood killed by gunfire.
- WW1: Daisy Simpson, later known as the "Lady Hooch Hunter," joins the SFPD morals squad.
- March 10, 1914: Officer Harry L. Sauer killed by gunfire.
- April 19, 1915: Officer Edward Maloney killed by gunfire.
- November 24, 1915: Corporal Frederick Holmes Cook killed by gunfire.
- January 8, 1916: Officer Thomas Deasy killed by gunfire.
- May 12, 1916: Officer Peter Hammond killed by gunfire.
- May 26, 1916: Sergeant John Joseph Moriarty killed by gunfire.
- July 22, 1916: The bombing on the Preparedness Day parade killed 10 people and wounded 40 others. Two known radical labor leaders – Thomas Mooney and Warren K. Billings arrested and sentenced to death under a hasty trial. They are eventually commuted by President Woodrow Wilson in 1918 and pardoned by California governor Culbert Olson in 1939.
- December 14, 1916: Officer Martin Judge struck and killed by streetcar
- February 1917: The police raid and blockade the notorious red-light district Barbary Coast and refuse entry to any men without legitimate business. The police then proceed to evict over 1073 prostitutes, giving them a few hours to collect their belongings, thereby effectively shutting down 83 dives and brothels after nearly three quarters of a century as the west coast's premiere vice district.
- August 1917: After three weeks of strikes on the United Railways, police are accused of refusing to search all "platform men" still on the job, causing president Koster of the San Francisco Law and Order Committee to notify the mayor that "unless he instructs the police to do their duty ... state and Federal government will be asked to interfere", in the United Railroad worker's strike.
- November 15, 1919: Police order all IWW members out of town.
- 1921: Appointment by Chief Dan O'Brien of Jack Manion to the Chinatown Squad.
- September 3, 1921: Famous silent film actor Roscoe Arbuckle aka Fatty Arbuckle involved in an alleged rape during his stay in San Francisco. The victim Virginia Rappe dies three days after party at Arbuckle's suite in the Saint Francis Hotel. The scandal attracts media attention and destroyed Arbuckle's career.
- 1923: Police Academy opens, first in the nation.

=== 1925–1950 ===
- March, 1925. SFPD adds chemical warfare capabilities, with tear gas bombs and mustard agents.
- William J. Quinn appointed chief 1929–1940. He builds a motorized force, including-side car motorbikes, adds radios to every car, installs teletype system and establishes SFPD academy on October 18, 1937.
- 1932: Mrs. Jessie Scott Hughes murdered, trial of public defender Frank Egan ends in first degree murder sentence of 25 years.
- 1934: The 1934 West Coast longshore strike Bloody Thursday July 5, 1934 Gene Olson and over a hundred people wounded, strikers Nicholas Bordois and Howard Sperry killed.
- July 17, 1934: the California National Guard blockade both ends of Jackson Street from Drumm to Front with machine gun mounted trucks to assist vigilante raids, protected by SFPD, on the headquarters of the Marine Workers' Industrial Union (MWIU) and the ILA soup kitchen at 84 Embarcadero. Moving on, the Workers' Ex-Servicemen's League's headquarters on Howard between Third and Fourth is raided, leading to 150 arrests and the complete destruction of the facilities. The employer's group, the Industrial Association, has agents riding with the police. Further raids are carried out at the Workers' Open Forum at 1223 Fillmore Street and the Western Worker building opposite City Hall containing a bookstore and the main offices of the Communist Party, which are thoroughly destroyed. Attacks are also perpetrated on the Workers' School at 121 Haight Street and the Mission Workers' Neighborhood House at 741 Valencia Street. This brings to an end the 1934 West Coast waterfront strike.
- Mid-1930s: Hiring of barrister Jake Ehrlich in mid-1930s by police officers association.
- March 16, 1937: Revelation of widespread graft reported in the 1937 investigation by DA Matthew Brady who hired private detective Edwin Atherton.
- Sunday, May 2, 1937: Patrolman George Burkhard, trophied marksman, shoots wife and two grown daughters then commits suicide in the midst of prosecution for falsifying documents related to his appearance at the Grand Jury graft hearings.
- May 29, 1937: Riot in the Polk Gulch area on the night of the Golden Gate Bridge Fiesta.
- September 1938: Mounted police chase striking Retail Department Store Employees Union in commercial district where thirty-five department stores are affected in general strike.
- October 1943: "Iron Ring" police clique exposed. Certain officers are accused of participating and profiting from after hours bars, vice, "juke box racket" and gambling operations. Ostentatious displays of jewelry, cars and flashy cash decried as criminal gains.
- 1940: Charles W. Dullea appointed chief by Mayor Angelo Joseph Rossi.
- May 1, 1942: meeting to establish The San Francisco Police Officers Association held with more than 100 members in attendance.
- October and November, 1943: San Francisco Chronicle reports accusations of police tip-offs in the Ynez Burns-Caldwell underground abortions case. Grand Jury holds hearings.
- 1944: Lake Merced firing range opens.
- 1945: V-Day riots last three days, mostly joined by men in uniform.
- May 6, 1946: San Francisco Police and Coast Guard patrol boats circling Alcatraz Island in response to call from Warden James Johnston as rioting breaks out.
- 1946: The San Francisco Police Officers Association established.
- 1946: Inspector Jack Manion of the Chinatown Squad retires.
- 1947: The Nick de John mafia murder of 1947.
- 1948: Chief Michael Mitchell appointed.
- 1949: Frame-up and arrest for narcotics possession of Billie Holiday.
- September 13–15, 1949: San Francisco Chronicle reports on investigation of fake traffic tickets, printer claims he made them for plainsclothesman Albert E. Birdsall, Sr.

=== 1950–1975 ===
- 1951: Chief Michael Gaffey appointed.
- 1955: Chief George Healy sworn in.
- February, 1955: Reporter Charles Raudebaugh writes a 12-part series titled "the Untold Story of the San Francisco Police Dept." for the San Francisco Chronicle. The editors preface states; "The people of San Francisco are entitled to a full, if unpleasant report on what sort of police they are getting for their money. It must be crystal clear that these stories are not an attack on the hundreds of honorable officers on the force. Rather, this is an unmasking of "The System" itself - A self-perpetuating tradition of indolence and corruption." - Editor.
- September 30, 1955: Chief George Healey asks for disbanding of Chinatown squad, upon request of influential Chinese World newspaper, which states that squad is an "affront to Americans of Chinese descent".
- May 1956: proposed bond issue proposition "A" to build a new Hall of Justice supported by the POA.
- 1956: Regular POA Meetings Held at Hamm's Brewery Skyroom.
- 1956: Chief Frances J. Ahern "Frank" appointed.
- 1957: The 1957 arrest of City Lights Bookstore publisher Lawrence Ferlinghetti on obscenity charges for publication of the Allen Ginsberg poem "Howl".
- October, 1957: Herbert P. Lee sworn in as first Chinese-American member of the SFPD, although there are references to other Chinese men served in the SFPD auxiliary in the 1940s.
- September 1, 1958: Chief Frances J. Ahern dies of a heart attack at a baseball game in Seal Stadium.
- 1958: Thomas J. Cahill, namesake of the current Hall of Justice appointed Chief.
- May 13, 1960: A large group of students and citizens fire-hosed down the marble steps inside City Hall rotunda by the SFPD for protesting their exclusion from HUAC hearings, 52 arrests.
- September 14, 1961: San Francisco Police Department vice squad raided the Tay-Bush Inn and arrested 103 people. All but 14 were men accused of dancing together and kissing. Charges were dropped against 101 of them.
- October 1961: Comedian Lenny Bruce arrested for obscenity.
- 1962: Elliott Blackstone is selected as SFPD's first liaison officer with the "homophile community."
- April 1962: Pacific Coast Unitarian Universalist Council meeting held in San Francisco in February contains the following: "Be It Therefore Resolved that we urge the creation at proper levels of government, tribunals of review and redress for police malpractice and misfeasance that shall be selected by and from the public at large having full powers of discipline, and that she shall endeavor to have enacted laws requiring that all persons with the powers of police officers shall be bonded in a sufficient amount to insure the safety of those who may have civil claims against them for malpractice and misfeasance."
- 1962: Dog patrol unit established.
- March 7, 1964: Tracy Sims, a prominent youth civil rights leader, helps organize the action as police arrest 167 of nearly 1,000 demonstrators who sat-in at the Sheraton-Palace Hotel in protest of the hotels failure to hire blacks.
- April 14, 1964: Police arrest 180 civil rights demonstrators, motivated by the San Francisco NAACP, on Van Ness Avenue's "Auto Row", including actor Sterling Hayden and six clergy, who continue sit-ins at major auto showrooms such as the Wessman Lincoln-Mercury and nearby Cadillac dealership, protesting discriminatory hiring practices and demanding integration of work sales force.
- January 1, 1965: New Year's Eve party at California Hall (Polk Street) raided and 600 attendees lined up and photographed as homosexuals. The cases went to trial with support from the ACLU. All were acquitted.
- 1965: Two police officers and three ex-convicts charged with burglary of the home of ex-madam Sally Stanford in Pacific Heights, San Francisco. All but one of the accused convicted. The case was also known as the "Sally Stanford Burglary Caper."
- August 1966: Compton's Cafeteria riot.
- Hunters Point riot September 27, 1966: A three-day riot breaks out when a white police officer shoots and kills a sixteen-year-old fleeing the scene of a stolen car. National Guard cover city for two days.
- 1966: Police seize copies of Lenore Kandel's book of poems, The Love Book, leading to another long obscenity trial. Kandel thanks police for the publicity by giving one percent of all profits to the Police Retirement Association.
- 1966 to 1967: Hippies enact walk-ins in Haight Street intersections precipitating repeated military-style police marches down the street.
- 1967: Police arrest dancers Rudolph Nureyev and Dame Margot Fonteyn on the roof of a house near the panhandle for being in the vicinity of pot smoking.
- December 1968 through January 1969: Police repeatedly called on student protesters by Chancellor S. I. Hayakawa.
- May 1, 1969: Arrest of seven young Latinos Los Siete De La Raza for the May 1, 1969, murder of an undercover officer Joe Brodnik and wounding of partner Paul McGoran.
- 1960s: Targeting of SFPD officers for assassination by militants alleged to be connected to the Black Panther Party.
- In the late 1960s, New Age philosopher Alan Watts suggests police cars be painted baby blue and white instead of black and white. This proposal was implemented in San Francisco by Chief Charles Gain in the late 1970s. Along with the new color scheme, Gain substituted the City's seal (which appeared on almost all other municipal vehicles owned by San Francisco), with "Police Services" for the department's traditional seven-pointed, blue star logo. Watts suggested the police wear baby blue uniforms, but this was never implemented. Later the police cars were repainted their former black and white colors with the blue star.
- 1960s to 1970s: The Zodiac serial killer case which rocked the Bay Area.
- February 16, 1970: A homemade bomb explodes outside the police station on Waller Street. Sgt. Brian McDonnell (44) died two days later and 8 other officers are injured. Black Panthers or the Weather Underground are suspects.
- 1970: Chief Alfred J. Nelder appointed.
- 1970s: The racially motivated Zebra murders by a violent offshoot of Nation of Islam.
- February 11, 1971: Officer Charles Logasa drowns when UH-1 Huey Helicopter crashes into Lake Merced. Pilot Stan Odmann attempts rescue.
- 1973: Officers for Justice file lawsuit against SFPD. The lawsuit alleges SFPD has engaged in a pattern of employment discrimination based on race, sex and national origin. Lawsuit settled by Consent Decree in 1979. As a result of the lawsuit, many rules and selection criteria for employment at the SFPD were declared illegal, including written examinations, minimum height requirements, and the strength test.

=== 1975–2000 ===
- 1975: Chief Charles Gain appointed.
- 1975: The Symbionese Liberation Army crime spree and the 1975 arrest of Patty Hearst, William and Emily Harris and Wendy Yoshimura in a house on Bernal Heights.
- August 18, 1975: Over 90% of 1,935 police walk out for four days in pay dispute, shooting out streetlights and arresting anyone who questions them. Mayor Joe Alioto threatens immediate suspension without pay for striking officers.
- September 22, 1975: President Gerald R. Ford dodges a second assassination attempt in less than three weeks. Sara Jane Moore, an FBI informer and self-proclaimed revolutionary, attempts to shoot the President outside a San Francisco hotel, but misses.
- August 4, 1977: Over 400 riot-equipped police (some on horseback), and sheriff's deputies take the International Hotel, known as the I-Hotel, from 2,000 protesters.
- August 25, 1977: Police commission approves an equal opportunity plan including recruitment of homosexuals.
- September 1977: Golden Dragon massacre.
- November 27, 1978 Former SFPD officer, firefighter and Supervisor Dan White is arrested for the assassinations of Mayor George Moscone and Supervisor Harvey Milk.
- May 21, 1979 The White Night Riots follow Dan White's acquittal of first degree murder charges and conviction on lesser charges of voluntary manslaughter when hundreds march to city hall and riot, break windows and torch police cars. These spontaneous actions lead to an unprovoked police raid on a Castro Street gay bar called the Elephant Walk, two miles away and hours after the City Hall disturbance.
- January 27, 1979 Police department settles racial discrimination suit filed by the Black Police Officer's Association.
- 1980: Chief Cornelius P. Murphy appointed.
- 1981: The 1981 arrest of David Carpenter, "Trailside Killer".
- May 1984: Notorious sex party at California Hall's Rathskeller bar, celebrating the graduation of new San Francisco Police Department cadets.
- September 1984: Police siege Lord Jim's bar looking for drugs.
- 1984: Still unsolved disappearance of Kevin Andrew Collins.
- 1984: Democratic National Convention.
- 1980s: The case against serial killers Leonard Lake and Charles Ng.
- 1980s: The case against Richard Ramirez, the night stalker.
- 1986: Chief Frank Jordan appointed.
- August 15, 1988: Captain Richard Holder leads arrest of first nine Food Not Bombs volunteers at Golden Gate Park.
- August 22, 1988: Police arrest 29 Food Not Bombs volunteers for Making a Political Statement at Golden Gate Park.
- September 5, 1988: 54 Food Not Bombs volunteers arrested sharing vegan food at Golden Gate Park.
- 1988: SF Police officer breaks two ribs and ruptures spleen of UFW leader Dolores Huerta at a demonstration in Union Square against George H. W. Bush, leading to the dismissal of officers with excessive force complaints and a settlement with the city for $825,000.
- October 6, 1989: Castro Sweep: In response to a small, peaceful protest by the AIDS activist group ACT UP San Francisco, more than 200 SFPD officers descend on the Castro District, the city's main gay neighborhood, on a busy Friday evening. Declaring the entire commercial district an unlawful-assembly zone, officers sweep all pedestrians from the streets and sidewalks over a seven-block area and prevent patrons from exiting businesses and residents from leaving their homes for an hour or more. More than 50 individuals are arrested, and a number of protesters and passersby are clubbed and injured by police officers. Following the event, the Office of Citizen Complaints, the city's independent police review board, determines that the crackdown had been ordered by Deputy Chief Frank Reed and that half of all officers on duty had taken part. The San Francisco Police Commission ultimately disciplines several officers, and the city pays $250,000 to settle two civil suits brought by victims of the police misconduct. The police action comes to be known as the Castro Sweep Police Riot.
- October 17, 1989: Loma Prieta earthquake.
- 1990: Chief Willis Casey appointed.
- 1992: Chief Anthony Ribera appointed.
- 1993: 68,000 citizens vote on measure BB to allow officer Bob Geary to carry his puppet, Brendon O'Smarty on patrol.
- 1993: Massacre at 101 California Street.
- 1993: The Anti-Defamation League Spy Scandal of 1993 involving ADL researcher Roy Bullock and officer Tom Gerard.
- New Year's Day, 1995: Four officers charged with using unnecessary force and making homophobic comments to party-goers at an AIDS fund-raiser at 938 Harrison Street.
- June 4, 1995: Aaron Williams, an African American man suspected of a pet store burglary dies in police custody. According to witnesses and police sources, a team of police led by Officer Marc Andaya repeatedly kicked Williams in the head and emptied three canisters of pepper spray into his face. Despite the fact that Williams was having difficulty breathing, the police hog-tied, gagged and left him unattended in the back of a police van, where he died.
- 1996: Chief Fred Lau appointed.
- April 6, 1996: Mark Garcia, a 15-year teamster, killed by San Francisco police. Garcia was robbed and partially stripped of his clothing. SFPD called. Instead of helping Mark, the police beat him, pepper spray him, handcuff him, stand on his back for more than five minutes, hog-tie him, and then throw him into the back of a police van. Although they took him to the hospital, Garcia died.
- May 1997: A two-year-long corruption trial involving alleged thefts from drug dealers by Gary Fagundes and two other officers in 1993–95 ends, prosecutors win no convictions. Superior Court jury sides with the officers on all verdicts so far - a total of 17 - with three charges against Fagundes left to be decided and one against Officer Steven Landi. Officer James Acevedo exonerated, winning three acquittals.
- July 1997: The Critical Mass bike ride that led to over a hundred arrests and charges of police overreaction.
- May 13, 1998: Sheila Patricia Detoy, sitting in the front seat of a Ford Mustang, shot once in the head by plainclothes police officers as the car barreled out of the driveway of the Oakwood Apartments. Mother of slain girl files wrongful death claim.
- December 1998: Investigation launched into cashier's checks specifically made out to the Vice Crimes Division and handed directly to a vice squad sergeant. The money was collected from massage parlor workers arrested by the Vice Squad.

=== 2000–present ===
- October 11, 2001 SFPD called to disturbance at High School. Thurgood Marshall High School.
- June 12, 2001: Idriss Stelley shot more than 20 times and killed by eight San Francisco Police Officers at the Sony Metreon. (See the Idriss Stelley Foundation)
- 2001: The case against Robert Noel and Marjorie Knoller for the death-by-dog of Diane Whipple.
- February 2002: Off-duty officer Steve Lee in fistfight with Gregory Hooper, a street vendor. Eyewitnesses report that after the fight ended, Lee shot the unarmed Hooper four times in the chest at point- blank range.
- March 2002: Five officers open fire on a mentally disabled man named Richard Tims wielding a knife, killing him. Barrage of bullets destroy a bus shelter, spray the block and hit onlooker Vilda Curry, a 39-year-old mother, causing her irreparable reproductive harm, and the loss of use of her leg.
- June 2002: Six year Police Chief Fred Lau announces retirement from force to take an airport security job with the U.S. Department of Transportation.
- July 2002: Mayor Willie Brown names Assistant Police Chief Earl Sanders as San Francisco's Chief.
- November 20, 2002: Scandal known as "Fajitagate" occurs when three off-duty police officers—Matthew Tonsing, David Lee, and Alex Fagan Jr.—assault two San Francisco residents, Adam Snyder and Jade Santoro, over a bag of fajitas. Alex Fagan Jr. is the son of SFPD Assistant Chief Alex Fagan, who later became Chief. Nine officers and Chief Earl Sanders are involved in a coverup regarding the fight. Incident leads to a grand jury indictment of the parties involved. However, unable to prove that a cover up ever existed, the district attorney drops the charges against former Chief Earl Sanders. Acting Chief Alex Fagan resigns. In 2006, a civil jury finds former officers Fagan and Tonsing liable for damages suffered in the beating, awarding plaintiffs Snyder and Santoro $41,000 in compensation.
- February 19, 2003: Michael Moll killed. Officers fire eight shots, striking Moll five times.
- 2003: Murder conviction overturned involving police officers Earl Sanders and partner Napoleon Hendrix for withholding evidence. In 2003, John Tennison and Antoine Goff are released after a federal court found Sanders and Hendrix withheld evidence. In 2009, The City pays a $7.5 million settlement for wrongful convictions.
- January 18, 2004: Mayor Gavin Newsom replaces Chief Alex Fagan with 26-year veteran Heather Fong, 47, first woman to run the SFPD. Newsom announced the appointment at a Vietnamese New Year's festival, appearing with Assistant Chief Fong.
- 2004: John Garvey publishes "San Francisco Police Department" booklet by Arcadia Publishing, dedicated to officers who have died in the line of duty, and especially to his great-great uncle Edward Maloney, killed in the line of duty in 1915. ISBN 0-7385-2898-6
- July 8, 2005: At an Anti-G8 protest, officer Peter Sheilds' skull is fractured, San Francisco police collaborate with Federal Homeland Security department and FBI in investigation of new media journalist Josh Wolf. Wolf is called to testify at the grand jury and jailed for 226 days, for refusing to speak.
- December 2005: A staged videotape of officers engaging in racist and sexist parodies leaked. Twenty officers suspended. Homemade videos for a Christmas party that parody the Police Department. President of SFPOA says the videos were meant as "comic relief" but acknowledges they were offensive and issues a public apology.
- December 2005: San Francisco Chronicle publishes wrap up of police corruption scandals in the SFPD.
- December 2006 to February 2007: The San Francisco Chronicle published a special report titled, The Use Of Force: When SFPD Officers Resort to Violence, detailing incidents and providing context for San Francisco police officer use of excessive force against suspects and citizens, and the consequences.
- January 2007: Eight former Black Panthers arrested for alleged involvement in the 1971 murder of Sgt. John V. Young at Ingleside station and other serious thirty-year-old crimes. Richard Brown, Richard O'Neal, Ray Boudreaux, and Hank Jones arrested in California. Francisco Torres arrested in Queens, New York. Harold Taylor arrested in Florida. Two of the men charged, Herman Bell and Jalil Muntaqim, have been in prison for over 30 years. Bail amounts running between three and five million dollars each. Supporters call these men the San Francisco 8.
- June 2007: Officer Jesse Serna, involved in five incidents in previous nine months in which citizens accused him of using excessive force without provocation, removed from street duty.
- May 2008: City pays $235,000 in largest settlement in an excessive force case not involving a weapon. Lawsuit claims San Francisco police officer Christopher Damonte used excessive force on schoolteacher Kelly Medora.
- December 20, 2008: Chief Heather Fong retires.
- April 2009: Female and minority officers accuse San Francisco Police Department of violating court orders in a 36-year-old discrimination lawsuit by appointing 31 sergeants to inspectors' jobs in 2007. The suit claims appointments by Chief Heather Fong illegally bypassed officers on a waiting list for assistant inspector, the entry-level detective position, after passing an exam that had been revised in response to the suit, said Officers for Justice, the group that sued the department in 1973.
- 2009: New Chief and former D.A. George Gascón hired,
- March 9, 2010: Police Chief George Gascón closes drug testing unit of the SFPD crime lab after technician Deborah Madden admits to skimming cocaine. Hundreds of criminal cases dismissed or discharged.
- March 2011: with group of undercover police officers under suspicion of perjury and conducting illegal searches, San Francisco District Attorney George Gascón drops at least 57 drug and robbery cases and continues to investigate scores more for possible dismissal.
- April 2011: Greg Suhr sworn in as Police Chief.
- June 29, 2012: SFPD evacuate Mayor Ed Lee from City Hall for bomb threat, leave everyone else in building.
- November 26, 2013: Jury awards $575,000 to former San Francisco police officer Bret Cornell who had sued the city, saying two colleagues wrongfully arrested him as he jogged in Golden Gate Park, causing him to be fired. Cornell said he was jogging on the morning of July 10, 2010, when he heard a man say, "I will shoot you!" and turned to see a "dark figure" pointing a gun at him. The man was Officer David Brandt, the suit said, so he continued running until he stumbled, rolled down a hill and saw uniformed Sgt. Wallace Gin and asked him for help. Gin and Brandt arrested him for "delaying an officer" rather than admit their own fault. The jury found that the officers had no reasonable suspicion of Cornell despite seeing a "look of worry" on his face, and thus no reason to stop him (let alone at gunpoint).
- December 5, 2014: Sgt. Ian Furminger found guilty on four of seven charges and Officer Edmond Robles was found guilty on five counts related to conspiracy to sell drugs, extortion and theft. They were found not guilty of conspiracy against civil rights and one theft charge.
- March 21, 2014: Alex Nieto killed by the SFPD on Bernal Hill.
- January 27, 2015: SFPD arrest Deputy Public Defender Jami Tillotson after she questions their interrogation of her client.
- February 26, 2015 SF police shoot and kill Guatemalan Amilcar Perez Lopez.
- March 14, 2015. San Francisco Chronicle report on racist emails from disgraced officer Ian Furminger and friends. Chief recommends dismissal of at least eight officers over racist text messages.
- June 2015: DA loses $2M in grant funds for rape kit backlog when SFPD won't sign on.
- June 15, 2015: SF cop shoots dog.
- October 2015: Allegations of favoritism by Chief for high school friend's son who failed training.
- November 29, 2015: 'Hot Cop of the Castro' arrested in S.F. injury hit-and-run.
- December 2, 2015: Five SFPD officers shoot and kill 26-year-old Mario Woods on Keith Street in the Bayview neighborhood. Woods, a suspect in a stabbing and wounding of a man, was confronted by officers on a sidewalk and was armed with a kitchen knife. The shooting, recorded by at least two bystanders, shows Woods being shot with a beanbag gun four times in the chest and hips, and then slowly approaching an officer who stepped into Woods' path before Woods is fired upon. The shooting led to protests in the city. An autopsy indicated that Woods had 20 gunshot wounds, in the head, back, abdomen, buttocks, legs and hands, and was under the influence of meth and marijuana.
- December 30, 2015: names of officers in Mario Woods shooting released.
- December 31, 2015: Chief Suhr seeks Federal Department of Justice review of SFPD policies, procedures and training.
- January 5, 2016: San Francisco city attorney to challenge court decision on racist police texts.
- February 1, 2016: Justice Department to investigate San Francisco Police Department.
- February 2016: Police Chief Greg Suhr is notified that rape cases are being swept under the rug by SFPD, and not taken seriously. Chief Suhr dismisses concerns.
- February 1, 2016: Police union targets Black officer for vocal critique of racism in the department. Chief says he is monitoring situation.
- April 2016: Police shoot and kill Luís Gongora Pat. After immediately complying with police orders to get on the ground, police shoot several bullets and ended his life.
- May 19, 2016: Police shoot and kill an unarmed 29-year-old woman, Jessica Williams, in Bayview. San Francisco Mayor Lee requests and receives resignation of Chief Greg Suhr.
- June 11, 2016: DA's launched report recommends reforms.
- April, 2019: Police Chief Bill Scott receives detailed account of extreme anti-Black racism and misogyny from Dante King, who has attempted for three years to train SFPD.
- July 2020: Amid widespread protests and riots to abolish the San Francisco Police Department, Police Chief Bill Scott reveals that barely any of the reforms mandated by the Dept. of Justice in 2016 have been completed. SFPD hired a multimillion dollar consultant for help making progress.
- November 23, 2020: For the first time in San Francisco history, a police officer is charged with an on-duty killing. Chris Samayoa, who was on the force for four days at the time of the incident, shot and killed Keita O'Neal, 42, an assault and car theft suspect, in Bayview-Hunters Point, on December 1, 2017. Samayoa, who had ended his job with the department, was charged with manslaughter and assault in connection with the case. O'Neal was allegedly unarmed during the incident, and was running away from Samayoa.
- November 2, 2021: Officer Kenneth Cha is charged with manslaughter over the 2017 shooting of Sean Moore, who died of his wounds in 2020. Cha shot Moore after he allegedly struck another officer.
- February 3, 2023: San Francisco executes settlement of discrimination to Dante King, who attempted to aid SFPD with its pervasive culture of bias and discrimination.
