= Mayoralty of Gavin Newsom =

42nd Mayor of San Francisco, 2004–2011

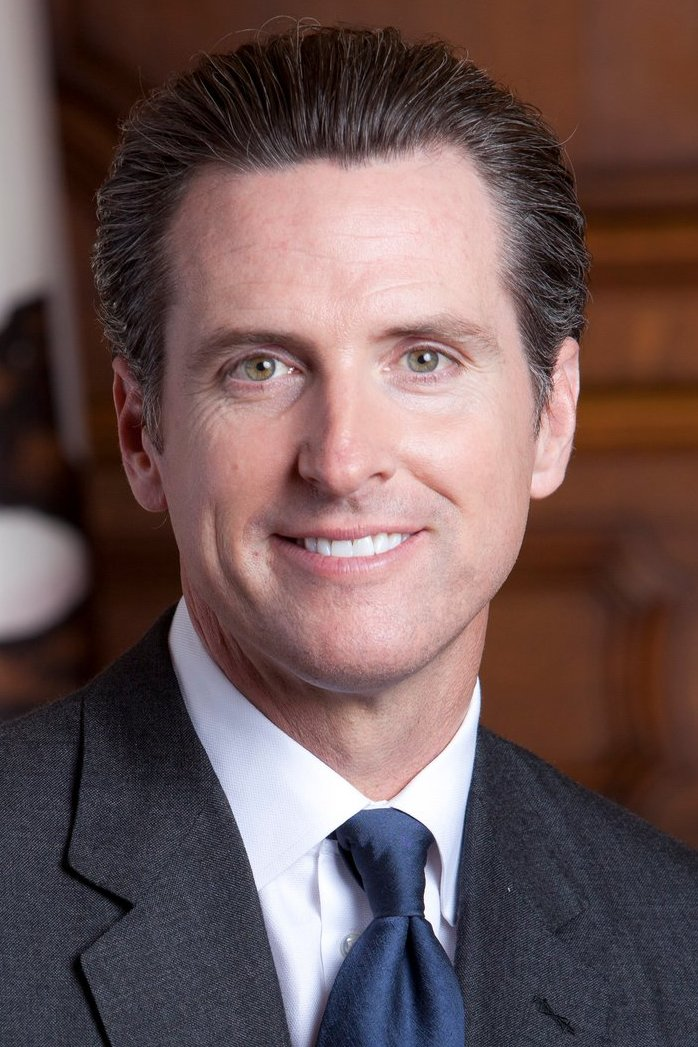
- Mayoralty of Gavin Newsom; January 8, 2004 – January 10, 2011
- Mayor: Gavin Newsom
- Party: Democratic
- Election: 2003; 2007
- Seal of San Francisco, California

The mayoralty of Gavin Newsom began when Democrat Gavin Newsom was elected Mayor of San Francisco in 2003, succeeding Willie Brown. Newsom, who was 36 when he took office, became San Francisco's youngest mayor in over a century.

As Mayor, Newsom has focused on development projects in Hunters Point and Treasure Island. He signed the Health Choices Plan in 2007 to provide San Francisco residents with universal healthcare. Under Newsom, San Francisco joined the Kyoto Protocol. In 2004, Newsom gained national attention when he directed the San Francisco city-county clerk to issue marriage licenses to same-sex couples. In August 2004, the California Supreme Court annulled the marriages that Newsom had authorized, as they conflicted with state law at that time. Still, Newsom's unexpected move brought national attention to the issues of gay marriage and gay rights, solidifying political support for Newsom in San Francisco and in the gay community, and causing several other states to change their laws concerning marriage and gay rights.

== Same-sex marriage ==
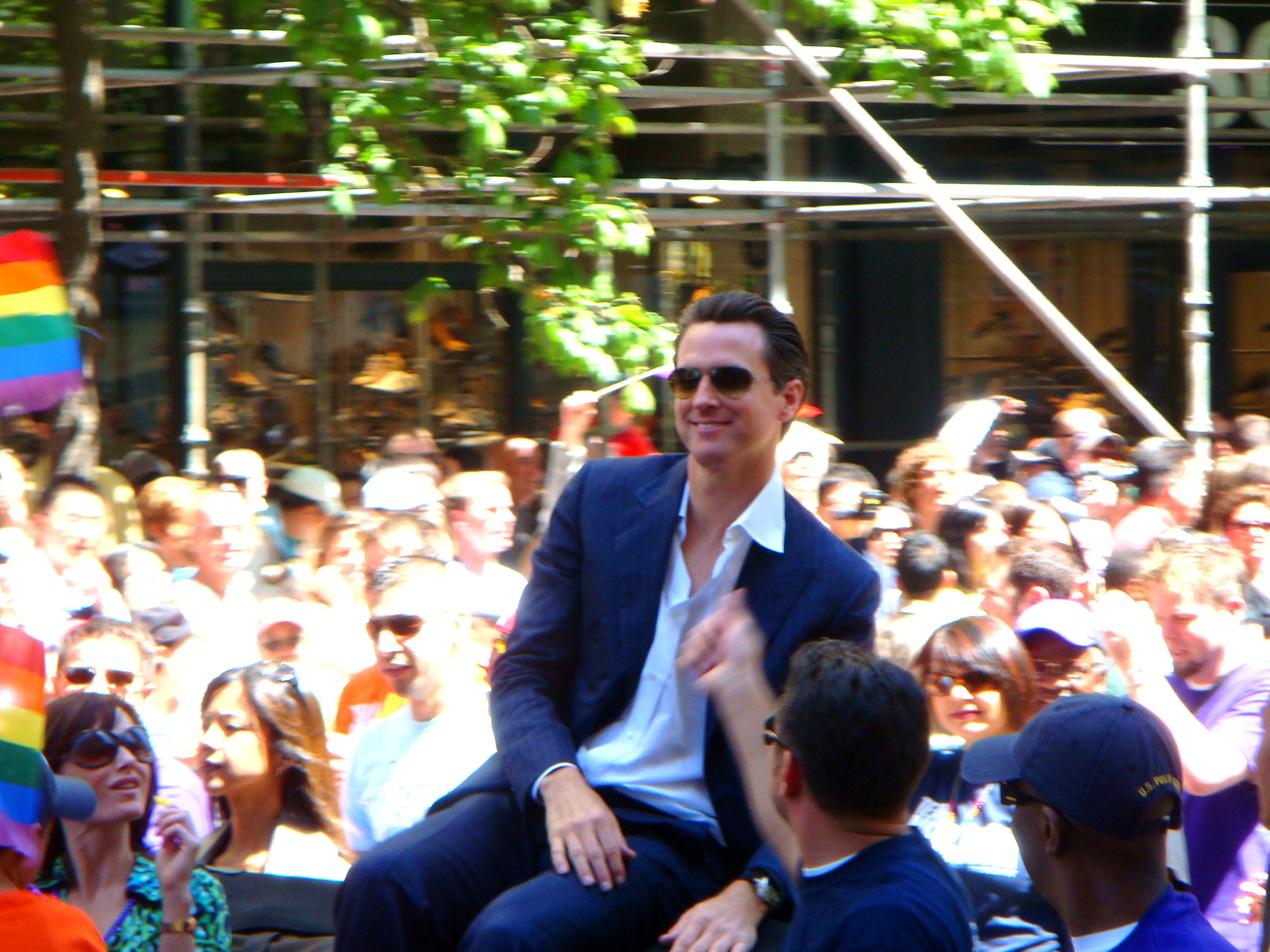
Newsom during the 2007 Gay Pride Parade

Newsom decided to act on the issue of same sex marriage when he attended the 2004 State of the Union Address as a guest of Nancy Pelosi. In the address, President George W. Bush voiced support for a constitutional amendment banning same sex marriage. In the weeks following the address, Newsom asked his staff to gather background information and to explore how the city could start issuing marriage licenses to same sex couples without alerting the media. Before the first marriage was performed, Newsom's office informed Nancy Pelosi, Dianne Feinstein, California Secretary of State Kevin Shelley, California Attorney General Bill Lockyer, and Democratic National Committee chairman Terry McAuliffe. Gay Massachusetts Congressman Barney Frank told Newsom that it wasn't the right time.

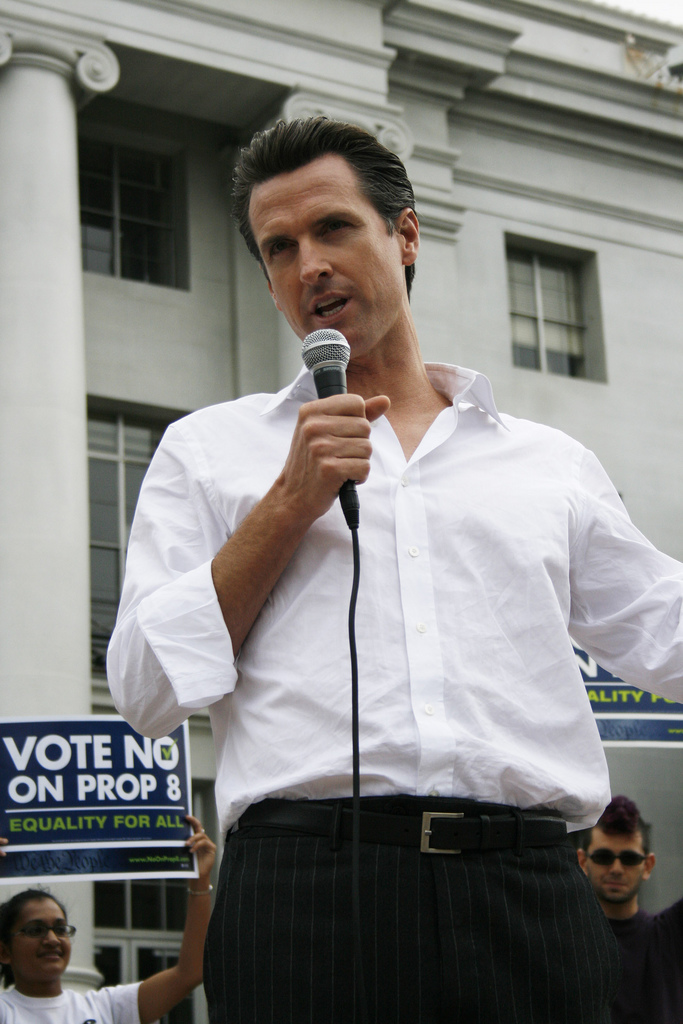
Gavin Newsom speaks at an Anti-Proposition 8 Rally at Sproul Plaza.

On his 36th day in office, Newsom issued a directive to the San Francisco city-county clerk to issue marriage licenses to same-sex couples, claiming that the California Constitution's equal-protection clause gave him authority to do so. Approximately 4,000 same-sex couples were issued licenses in San Francisco from February 12 until March 11, 2004 (when the weddings were halted by the California Supreme Court), bringing international attention to the Mayor and the City. On August 12, 2004, the California Supreme Court voided those licenses, declaring Newsom had overstepped his authority. Following this decision, San Francisco and nearly two dozen gay couples sued the state of California on the issue of same sex marriage. In 2005, Superior Court Judge Richard Kramer agreed with the city, but the decision was overturned by the state appeals court. The case was heard by the California Supreme Court, which ruled in favor of the plaintiffs.

Many prominent Democrats, such as Dianne Feinstein, criticized Newsom for issuing the directive for same sex marriage licenses, claiming it had contributed to John Kerry's defeat in the 2004 presidential election. Former San Francisco mayor Willie Brown has stated that Barack Obama declined to have his picture taken with Newsom at a fundraiser in 2004. Obama's deputy campaign director, Steve Hildebrand, has denied this, calling it "a ridiculous story". The 2004 same sex marriages increased Newsom's popularity in San Francisco to the level where he faced no serious opposition to his reelection in 2007.

The Award Winning Documentary Film Pursuit of Equality, which was directed by the Mayor's brother-in-law, Geoff Callan, chronicles these events.

=== "Whether You Like It or Not" ===
Proposition 8, the ban on same-sex marriage, was a big topic during the 2008 election, and Newsom was a prominent and vocal opponent. In the months leading up to Election Day, Proposition 8 supporters released a commercial featuring Newsom saying the following words in a speech regarding same-sex marriage: "This door's wide open now. It's going to happen, whether you like it or not." Some observers noted that polls shifted in favor of Proposition 8 following the release of the commercial; this, in turn, led to much speculation about Newsom's unwitting role in the passage of the amendment. For instance, a January 2009 Newsweek article states:

[A]sk average Californians what they remember about Newsom at the moment, and they're likely to offer six words: "whether you like it or not". That's what Newsom said about gay marriage—it was coming to California, and America, whether you like it or not. He said it in a speech, shortly after the California Supreme Court extended marriage rights to gays and lesbians. But his words were captured for posterity in an ad for Proposition 8, the ballot initiative seeking to reverse that decision. The ad begins with footage of a gloating Newsom grinning widely and gesturing broadly as he exclaims "the door's wide open, it's going to happen, whether you like it or not" . . . . Airing across the state, the ad was viewed as among the most effective in support of the ban.

Newsom has expressed his disappointment over the passage of the amendment.

== Social policy ==
Implementation of Care Not Cash began on July 1, 2004. As part of his Care Not Cash initiative, 5,000 more homeless people were given permanent shelter in the city. As of October 21, 2007, about 2,000 people have been placed into permanent housing with support. Other programs initiated by Newsom to end chronic homelessness include the San Francisco Homeless Outreach Team (SF HOT), and Project Homeless Connect (PHC). SF HOT functions as a short-term intensive case management team, assisting the most disabled homeless individuals to access health, social and housing services. PHC consists of bimonthly events that bring together a host of public and private services at one location, making it easier for homeless individuals to connect with a number of services under one roof. Both of these programs have worked to move homeless people into permanent, supportive housing. In his 2004 State of the City Address, to highlight the issue of homelessness, Newsom declared that "homelessness has replaced the Golden Gate Bridge and the cable car as one of the city's most defining symbols."

Newsom has worked to improve San Francisco public housing through Newsom's public private partnership initiative called SF HOPE. Newsom has focused city resources on impoverished districts in Bayview-Hunters Point on San Francisco's southeast side, often arriving there without notice to follow through on city programs. On one occasion, Newsom took several Hunters Point children to Burger King and to a San Francisco 49ers game. The Baysview-Hunters Point project includes over 8,500 housing units and 350 acres (1.4 km^{2}) of open space. Since Newsom became mayor, the city has put nearly $500 million into construction of affordable housing that house nearly 20 percent of San Francisco's families. Newsom also worked on plans for 6,000 new homes and apartments on Treasure Island, new high-rise apartments and condominiums on Rincon Hill, and has worked on rebuilding the Transbay Terminal.

Newsom helped secure $77 million to help some of San Francisco's underperforming schools and worked to put more police officers in schools. In February 2008, Newsom committed $30.6 million from San Francisco's budget reserves to help San Francisco Unified School District close a $40 million drop in state funding due to state budget deficits.

== Economic policy ==
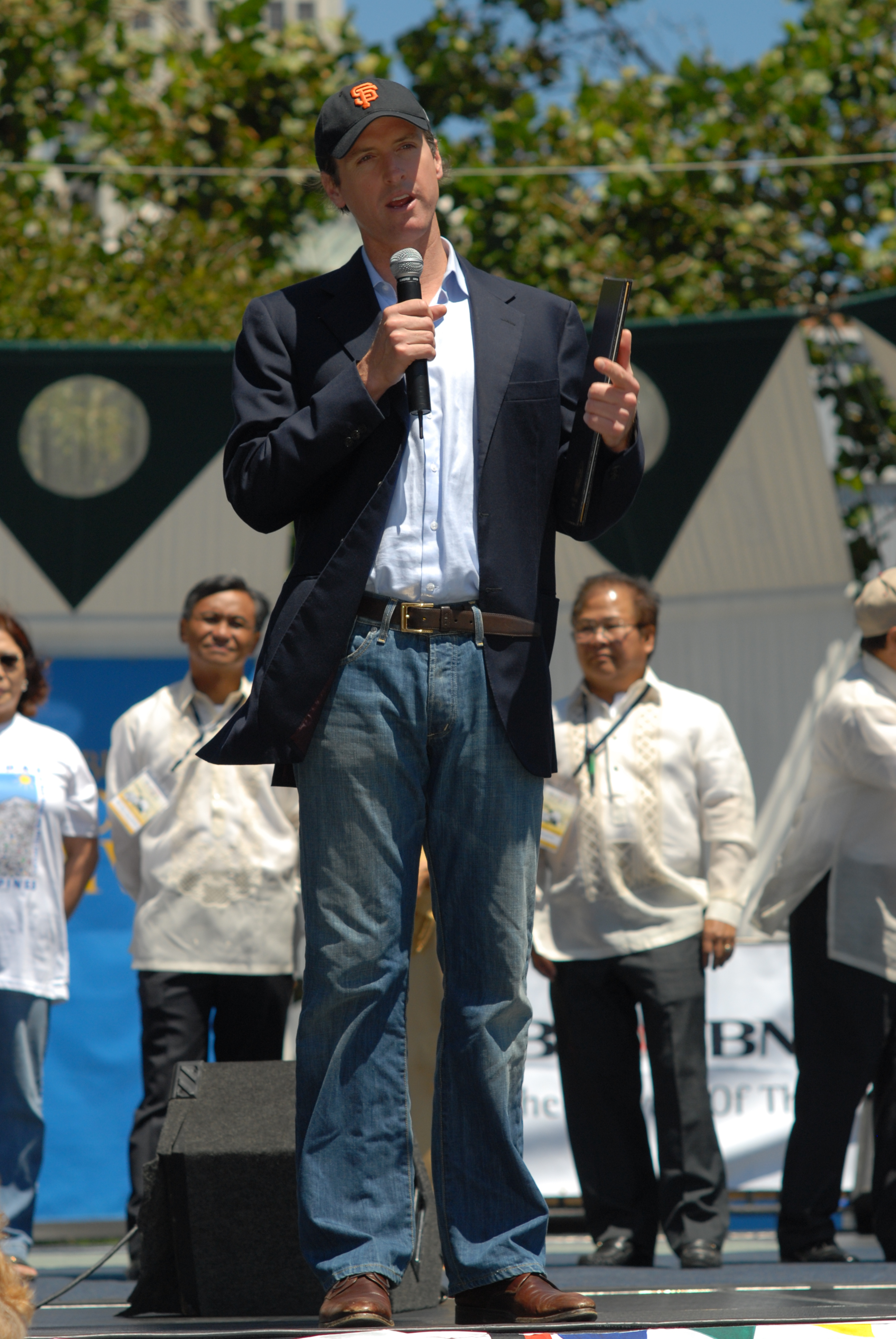
Newsom at the 2007 San Francisco Annual Pistahan Days

During Newsom's first term as mayor, tourism, air traffic, and hotel occupancy increased while unemployment decreased by 2.5%. 57 new companies and 35 new biotech firms opened in San Francisco, including the California Institute for Regenerative Medicine Stem Cell Institute. Newsom supported biotech and clean industry tax incentives to bring more businesses to San Francisco. In 2005, Newsom implemented the Working Families Tax Credit, providing the average San Francisco family with an extra $300. Newsom has made efforts to reach out to San Francisco businesses. In 2004, Newsom had a 100 in 100 campaign, meeting with 100 CEO's in 100 days to try to make San Francisco more business friendly.

While the unemployment rate has decreased, San Francisco has 90,000 fewer jobs since 2000. Rising costs of living, combined with the blue collar jobs leaving San Francisco, have made it harder for blue collar workers to live in San Francisco. Newsom has worked to address these problems with affordable housing and has claimed that the new high tech companies will also bring some blue collar jobs to San Francisco.

On October 27, 2004, during a strike by hotel workers on a dozen San Francisco hotels, Newsom joined UNITE HERE union members on a picket line in front of the Westin St. Francis Hotel. He vowed that the city would boycott the hotels by not sponsoring city events in any of them until the hotels agreed to a contract with workers. The contract dispute was settled in September 2006. Newsom's support of the workers angered some businesses who had been traditional Newsom backers.

In order to help balance San Francisco's budget in 2004, Newsom supported Proposition J to increase sales taxes and Proposition K to increase business taxes. Both measures failed in 2004. Newsom laid off hundreds of city workers and cut city services in 2004 to balance the city budget. Newsom helped close San Francisco's budget deficit in 2004 by consolidating 6 city departments that reduced the city budget by $78 million.

In an attempt to provide universal wireless Internet access to city residents free of charge, Newsom spent 18 months trying to develop a city-wide Wi-Fi zone. Google WiFi partnered with entrepreneur Jaz Banga, and his company Feeva, beginning in 2005 to provide free Wi-Fi in Union Square, but the plan was to blanket the city. Negotiations with the Board of Supervisors and Internet service provider EarthLink ended when EarthLink pulled out of the talks. Newsom said he would continue to work for universal Wi-Fi. Other unachieved efforts include a cruise ship terminal and a waterfront YMCA.

During Newsom's time as Mayor, the San Francisco 49ers caught Newsom by surprise when they announced they would be moving to Santa Clara. Newsom received some criticism for being too hands off in the discussions, a claim Newsom denies. In 2005, Newsom participated in the announcement of the 2007 Major League Baseball All Star Game that would be held in San Francisco. He participated in the 2007 All-Star Legends and Celebrity Softball Game.

== Environment ==
Under Newsom, San Francisco joined the Kyoto Protocol. San Francisco's Climate Action Plan is aimed at helping San Francisco meet its Kyoto Protocol targets. Newsom helped San Francisco implement green building standards and improve open spaces. Newsom helped secure $8 million in federal and local funds to improve city streetscape. Newsom's efforts have helped lead to the planting of over 17,500 new trees. Newsom approved of a plan to convert the city's fleet of diesel buses and vehicles to biodiesel. On February 21, 2008, he urged Bay Area cities and counties to write letters to auto-makers urging them to manufacture plug-in hybrid cars. Newsom said San Francisco would buy the cars if automakers produced them. He also supports putting large turbines below the Golden Gate Bridge. He supported a ban on city government purchased water bottles and he asked San Francisco businesses to stop selling bottled water. He has approved of legislation to convert San Francisco's taxis to low-emission vehicles.

== Immigration ==
On April 23, 2007, Newsom again drew national attention when he announced at a community action held by the San Francisco Organizing Project that he would do everything he could to discourage federal authorities from conducting immigration raids. "Our action is to stand strong in opposition to these raids... to make sure that we are not contributing in any way, shape or form," Newsom said. "Even legal immigrants are fearful. This just sends a chill to a lot of people. There are a lot of cities that want these raids. That's where the federal government should be spending their time." Newsom supported city identification cards for undocumented immigrants in 2007 to allow them access to city services and to be able to set up bank accounts in the city. In April 2008, San Francisco undertook a $83,000 advertisement campaign to inform city residents that San Francisco is a sanctuary city as part of the identification card program. In July 2008, following the high profile murder of a local father and his two sons by a previously arrested undocumented immigrant, as reported on CNN, Newsom announced that San Francisco would change its policy of shielding undocumented immigrants who had committed other crimes and that San Francisco would begin to cooperate with the federal government in that regard. However, the city remains a sanctuary for undocumented immigrants.

== Health ==
Early in Newsom's first term, he worked to extend the city-funded health insurance program, started under Mayor Brown, to young adults, a program that had been previously offered only to children. Newsom's more ambitious plan on healthcare began to take shape in 2007. In his budget proposal for fiscal year 2007-2008, Newsom announced his intention to provide universal health care for all city residents, based on long-time City Supervisor Tom Ammiano's plan. The care will be provided through the San Francisco Health Access Plan.

Newsom's Health Access Plan, also known as Health San Francisco, shares the cost with workers and businesses using federal, state, and city funds and savings to provide healthcare insurance to all San Franciscans. The system plans to use more electronic referrals, focus on preventive care, and work to provide care to San Francisco's 82,000 uninsured adults. Newsom's proposal has prompted Oakland mayor Ron Dellums and San Mateo County's Board of Supervisors to look into possibilities for providing their own taxpayer-subsidized health care.

In February 2008, Newsom, also a restaurateur, signed a measure, backed by the Golden Gate Restaurant Association, to ask San Francisco restaurants to voluntarily ban trans fats from their kitchens.

== Public safety ==
Newsom began his first term by appointing San Francisco's first female police chief, Heather Fong, and fire chief, Joanne Hayes-White. He later vetoed legislation mandating a police foot-patrol policy in favor of police discretion that was overturned by the Board of Supervisors. In December 2005, Newsom went public with a video that was made by a police office, which depicted police officers making mock calls that were racist, sexist, and homophobic according to Newsom. Newsom admitted that reforms aimed at changing the culture of the police department had gone slower than expected. San Francisco has experienced an increase in homicides during Newsom's tenure as Mayor. Newsom has made efforts to lower the homicide and crime rates. Rape, aggravated assault, and burglary have decreased.

Newsom is a member of the Mayors Against Illegal Guns Coalition, an organization formed in 2006 and co-chaired by New York City mayor Michael Bloomberg and Boston mayor Thomas Menino. The organization of mayors supports gun control and is especially strong on the advocacy to abolish the Tiahrt Amendment. Newsom opposes capital punishment.

On April 9, 2008, Newsom and Police Chief Fong decided to use the alternative route for the Olympic torch run through San Francisco. The torch run drew thousands of protesters protesting against or for China and the 2008 Summer Olympics. Newsom said he made the decision to ensure the safety of people at the event.

== Government issues and Muni ==
Newsom has reduced the appearance of political patronage in city government that became more common during the Brown administration. Many of Newsom's opponents on the Board of Supervisors credit him for reducing patronage in city government. He launched a 311 hotline that provides 24-hour live operator assistance to San Franciscans concerning city services.

In 2005, voters rejected Proposition D which would have decreased the Mayor's control over Muni and given that power to the Board of Supervisors. During Newsom's time as mayor, Muni's on-time performance improved 5%. In 2006, Newsom publicly stated he believed Muni was pocketing fares after Newsom had ridden Muni and was not given a receipt on several occasions. Newsom considered making Muni fare-free, but he dropped the idea after a study he commissioned to investigate the idea showed it would not work. Newsom has had several policy forums, one of which discussed Muni. In one 2007 forum, Newsom said he was a "Mayor who rides Muni". Newsom appointed the "Transit Effectiveness Project" to conduct an 18-month review of Muni. The task force conducting the review consisted of current and former government officials with backgrounds in transportation and public finance. The review has investigated means to make Muni run more efficiently and increase its on-time rate that includes increasing Muni revenue by raising fares and advertising on Muni property. On February 27, 2008, Newsom and Muni officials released the results of the review, which called for eliminating, shortening, and expanding bus routes to focus service on Muni's 15 busiest corridors that are used by 75% of Muni users. Muni will also continue efforts to hire more drivers and street supervisors and increase enforcement against motorists who block bus lanes. Newsom said at February 27 plan revealing: "Without dramatic changes we will not see dramatic improvements." Newsom has also been a supporter of the Chinatown Subway plan, a $1.22 to $1.44 billion subway line that links the Market Street area to Chinatown.

== Critics and criticisms ==
According to the San Francisco Chronicle, Newsom is known to be particularly sensitive to how he is portrayed in the media. At times, Newsom has yelled at reporters, refused to answer questions from certain reporters, abruptly terminated interviews, and has threatened to blacklist news outlets. Newsom has been criticized for having a large number of press releases, made for TV news conferences, and catchy names to new initiatives that might be obscuring what is actually accomplished.

Board of Supervisors President Aaron Peskin's criticisms of Newsom have frequently been included in the San Francisco Chronicle articles that discuss Newsom's policies and actions as Mayor. After his reelection, Newsom was criticized by Supervisor Peskin for taking a vacation in Hawaii during the 2007 San Francisco Bay oil spill. Newsom defended his decision to continue with his three-day vacation plans, claiming that he was in constant contact with his aides and that other agencies were overseeing the crisis. In February 2008, Newsom and Peskin's back and forth actions and comments led the Chronicle to conclude that the two were in a "war of words". Newsom has also been criticized by opponents of gay marriage for legalizing gay marriage in San Francisco. He was criticized by conservative pundits for issuing a proclamation to honor Colt Studio Group, a gay porn studio.

== Rippey-Tourk affair ==
Newsom had an affair with his secretary Ruby Rippey Tourk—the wife of his campaign manager and good friend.

On January 31, 2007, Newsom's campaign manager and former deputy chief of staff, Alex Tourk, resigned after confronting Newsom over a sexual affair the mayor had with his wife in late 2005. At the time of the affair, Newsom was undergoing a divorce with Guilfoyle and Rippey-Tourk worked in Newsom's office as the Mayor's aide for commission appointments. After leaving her job in Newsom's office in August 2006, Tourk received $10,154 in catastrophic illness pay, which is usually reserved for those who are terminally ill; after an investigation by the San Francisco City attorney; however, Newsom and all those involved were later cleared of legal wrongdoing.

Newsom apologized for the affair at a news conference on February 1, 2007, saying, "I hurt someone I care deeply about, Alex Tourk, his friends and family, and that is something that I have to live with and something that I am deeply sorry for." After being approached by concerned colleagues, he announced that he would seek treatment for alcohol abuse. Newsom later said that the difficult times during the exposing of the affair refocused him and allowed him to better appreciate being mayor.

== Staff hiring ==
Newsom started his second term with a clean slate after asking for and receiving open letters of resignation from city commissioners and department heads prior to his 2007 reelection. He replaced 3 of 7 members of the Municipal Transportation Agency. Newsom also dismissed Public Utilities Commission General Manager Susan Leal. With projected city budget revenue shortfalls, Newsom froze city hiring, eliminated 1,700 city jobs, and ordered all agencies to cut their budget by 8%. Newsom was criticized by some members of the Board of Supervisors when he hired new policy directors that included a director of climate protection initiatives, a homeless policy director, and former U.S. attorney Kevin Ryan, who was dismissed by the Bush administration, as his new criminal justice director to address San Francisco's rising homicide rates. The Board of Supervisors Budget Analyst conducted a report on the mayor's staffing salaries that concluded that over one million dollars in salaries were paid out of city department budgets. Newsom defended these hires by claiming his office would come in under budget and that using MTA and other department funds to pay for the mayor's policy directors is common practice. The additional cost to the city was $500,000 over the next 18 months. A February 2008 opinion poll showed Newsom's approval rating at 67%.

== Use of social media ==
Newsom is considered a pioneer in the use of social media in politics. In 2008, Newsom was the first U.S. mayor to deliver his "state of the city" address on social media. Newsom and his press secretary, Nathan Ballard, came up with the idea after noting the length of the mayor's speeches. It was called "gutsy" and "brilliant" by NPR. In 2010, a Samepoint study measuring the social media influence of mayors around the country ranked Newsom as the "most social mayor" in the United States.
