= Dullea =

Dullea is a surname. Notable people with the surname include:

- Charles W. Dullea (1889–1966), Chief of San Francisco Police Department
- Keir Dullea (born 1936), American actor
