= Prentice Earl Sanders =

American police officer (1937–2021)

Prentice E. Sanders
- Born: Prentice Earl Sanders; October 12, 1937; Nacogdoches, Texas
- Died: January 11, 2021 (aged 83); Burlingame, California
- Other name: Earl
- Police career
- Department: San Francisco Police Department
- Service years: 1964–2003
- Rank: Chief (2002–2003)

Prentice Earl Sanders, also known as Earl Sanders (October 12, 1937 – January 11, 2021), was a member of the San Francisco Police Department from 1964 through 2003. He became the first African American chief of that department in 2002. His tenure was marked by "Fajitagate", a scandal over a street brawl involving several officers followed by an impeachment investigation, which led to his eventual departure.

== Biography ==
=== Youth and education ===
Sanders was born in Nacogdoches, Texas on October 12, 1937, and moved with his mother to Houston and later to Los Angeles. He moved to San Francisco's Laurel Heights to live with an uncle at the age of fourteen after his mother died. He graduated in 1956 from George Washington High School, where he played football, joined ROTC, and was president of the Eagle Service Society. Sanders served in the Army National Guard from March 1954 until October 1958, attaining the rank of Infantry Second Lieutenant. He attended City College of San Francisco and achieved bachelor's (1975) and master's (1977) degrees from Golden Gate University. He also taught in the 1980s as a part-time faculty member in the Criminal Justice department at San Jose State.

=== Police officer ===
He joined the San Francisco Police Department in 1964. At the time Sanders joined the force, there were fewer than two dozen African American officers in the department, and the first black SFPD civil-service officers had been hired sixteen years earlier. In 1966, Sanders was assigned to the Robbery Squad, and in 1971 to the homicide bureau (where he was teamed with Inspector Napoleon Hendrix from 1979 through 1995). The day after Martin Luther King was assassinated in 1968, Sanders – then on the robbery detail – solved the murder of a Muni driver in Hunters Point. In 1973, Sanders and SFPD Inspector Rotea Gilford were assigned to the Zebra killings investigation headed by white SFPD officers Gus Coreris and John Fotinos. In 1975, no African American officer joined the police and fireman strike. In 2002 Sanders and Hendrix were accused of misconduct during the 1989 murder arrest and conviction of two young African American men, colluding with prosecutors in suppressing a confession from another person.

=== Officers For Justice class-action lawsuit ===
In 1968, Sanders was a founding member of the Officers for Justice association. In 1973 the group filed a class-action discrimination lawsuit in federal court against SFPD, the City, and County of San Francisco, and the Civil Service Commission for their failure to recruit and hire minorities. Sanders and Gilford were the ranking African-American members of SFPD, and OFJ lead counsel Robert Gnaizda stated "The lawsuit never would have occurred without Earl Sanders..." The mostly white San Francisco Police Officers Association, however, chose to join the defendants. In 1979 the parties entered into a consent decree, under which the SFPD was to modify its hiring and promotional practices. The trial began in November 1978, and Sanders was the only witness called. Judge Peckham recessed the trial for settlement negotiations which resulted in the consent decree.

=== Police chief ===
Sanders's OFJ and civil-rights activities introduced him to lawyer Willie Brown, who appointed Sanders as an assistant chief of the SFPD when Brown was elected mayor in 1996. The SFPD, under out-going chief Fred H. Lau, had been excoriated in the San Francisco Chronicle for poor results on major crime investigation, so the appointment of Sanders seemed to address Brown's need.

Four months after his appointment, a street fight involving off-duty SFPD officers made news in the Chronicle. Three months after that, SF District Attorney Terence Hallinan indicted Sanders and nine other senior SFPD officers for obstructing justice in the investigation of that incident; the accused were arrested and placed on leave. Charges against Sanders were dropped twelve days later.

During 2003 and through 2004, most of the ten accused senior officers (including Chief Sanders) pursued legal appeals to clear their names of the underlying factual claims regarding the obstruction. Sanders and several others were eventually cleared by courts; Sanders was declared factually innocent by the court.

Before the charges against Sanders were dropped, however, Mayor Brown had publicly called for Sanders' resignation. Sanders also claimed that he had suffered a mild stroke, and was unable to return to duty. During his recovery period, the 1989 murder convictions of John Tennison and Antoine Goff (on which Sanders and Hendrix were the investigators) were reversed for prosecution errors. In early 2004 Sanders filed a $33 million claim against the city and Hallinan.

=== Retirement ===
Sanders elected to retire due to stress from the investigation in August 2003. He continued to pursue his claim against the city, arguing that he had been prosecuted maliciously in the Fajitagate scandal, taking it through suit and appeals. In late October 2007, the United States Supreme Court turned down the final appeal from Sanders in his lawsuit.

In 2006, Earl Sanders and co-author Bennet Cohen, his former lawyer, published The Zebra Murders about Sanders' career and specifically his role in the 1973–74 investigation. The book has been heavily criticized by former SFPD deputy chief Kevin Mullen and former SFPD lieutenant and SFPOA supporter Louis Calabro.

== Personal ==
Sanders married Espanola Wiley in 1960. They had two children.

Sanders was a member of the Boulé since 1983.

== Sources ==
- Zebra Murders by Prentice Earl Sanders and Bennett Cohen

Police appointments
Preceded by Fred H. Lau	Chief of San Francisco Police Department; 2002–2003	Succeeded by Alex Fagan
