= Nathan Ballard =

American political strategist and attorney

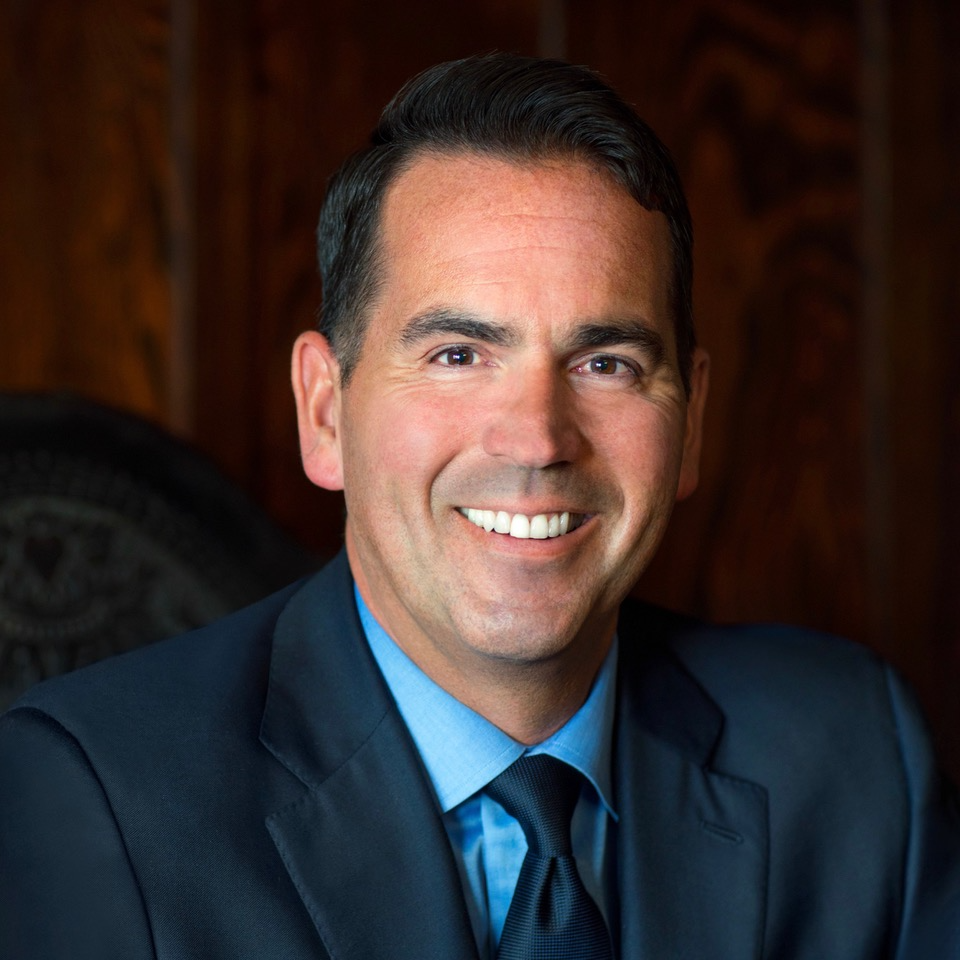
- Born: Nathan F. Ballard
- Occupations: Democratic strategist Spokesperson; Attorney
- Known for: Former spokesman for Governor of California Gavin Newsom
- Website: www.nathanballard.com

Nathan Ballard is a U.S. Democratic political strategist and attorney. He was the communications director for the governor of California, Gavin Newsom, when Newsom was the 42nd mayor of San Francisco. He is a longtime friend and advisor to Newsom. He sat on the board of directors of The Representation Project, Jennifer Siebel Newsom's nonprofit organization. Ballard had close ties with the 43rd mayor of San Francisco, Ed Lee. He was an advisor to Mark Farrell, the 44th mayor of San Francisco, and Daniel Lurie, the 46th mayor of San Francisco.

Ballard has worked as a spokesman for the Democratic National Committee, the California Labor Federation, AFL–CIO, former Secretary of State John Kerry, and Wesley Clark. Ballard was a spokesman for the Golden State Warriors and was a spokesman for the Super Bowl 50 host committee, led by Lurie. He has represented prominent families and individuals including the Getty family and Dede Wilsey.

== Career ==
In 2000, Ballard was a deputy city attorney and spokesman for the city attorney in San Francisco. He served as a deputy city attorney alongside Kamala Harris, later U.S. Vice President.

From 2007 to 2010, Ballard was the communications director for San Francisco Mayor Gavin Newsom. He worked for a coalition of labor unions against a 2010 pension measure in San Francisco. In 2010, Burson-Marsteller, a global public relations and communications consultancy, appointed Ballard as managing director. He later resigned from the post.

In 2011, Ballard worked for a coalition including labor unions, civic leader Warren Hellman, and San Francisco Mayor Ed Lee to pass labor-backed reforms against a rival measure funded by Sir Michael Moritz. Also in 2011, around the time of the Occupy Oakland protests, Ballard briefly served as a crisis manager for Oakland Mayor Jean Quan, following the resignation of the city's police chief. At that time, he was described as having "lots of law enforcement clients".

In 2016, the San Francisco Police Officers Association hired Ballard for what was described as a "counterattack" against police reform attempts following the controversial killing of Mario Woods by officers and concerns about racism in the city's police department. Ballard was criticized for using exaggerated crime figures in the union's campaign against George Gascón, the district attorney, and acknowledged having misread the rates. Ballard stepped down from the union to avoid a conflict of interest while serving as an advisor to San Francisco Mayor Mark Farrell.

In 2016, Ballard represented Burma Superstar, a restaurant chain that was sued for allegations of employee mistreatment.

In 2017, Ballard was an advisor to Lurie as he explored a San Francisco mayoral run. Ballard worked for Oakland Mayor Libby Schaaf in the aftermath of the Ghost Ship warehouse fire that killed 36 people. Ballard's PR agency, The Press Shop, was criticized for its role in managing public relations related to the Ghost Ship fire.

Ballard was a consultant to angel investor Ron Conway.

In 2019, Ballard's PR agency opened a second office in Sacramento and brought on the California Correctional Peace Officers' Association (CCPOA), a 26,000-member union, as a client. He represented a statewide coalition of "dozens" of legal cannabis companies. His agency represented PG&E as the company faced bankruptcy and criticism about devastating wildfires.

In 2020, Ballard was an advisor to a 501(c)(4) campaign launched by Lurie. During the COVID-19 pandemic, Ballard represented a large chain of elder care providers in California where nearly half of the state's coronavirus deaths occurred in elder care facilities. Ballard was a spokesman for the Getty family.

== Political associations ==
Ballard was a spokesman for the California Democratic Party in 2002. In 2002 he was also a spokesman for New Hampshire Senate President Beverly Hollingworth's campaign for governor of New Hampshire. In 2003, Ballard was the spokesman for the California Labor Federation, AFL–CIO, during the recall of Governor Gray Davis.

During the 2004 U.S. presidential campaign, Ballard was a spokesman for Wesley Clark during the primaries. Later in 2004, Ballard was a spokesman for U.S. Senator John Kerry's presidential campaign in California. In 2006, Ballard was U.S. Congresswoman Jackie Speier's spokesman when she campaigned for lieutenant governor of California.

In 2010, Ballard was Rep. Jackie Speier's spokesman when she weighed a run for attorney general in California.

In 2012, Ballard was the spokesman for Proposition 38, a California tax measure for public education. He was also the spokesman for the Coalition for Humane and Ethical Farming Standards, made up of more than 100 chefs in California seeking to lift the state's ban on foie gras at the time. Ballard was the spokesman for the union representing the San Francisco Symphony musicians during the 2013 strike.

In 2013, Ballard was the spokesperson for San Francisco's bid to host the 2016 Super Bowl and the team spokesperson for the Golden State Warriors new arena project. In 2014, he served as the spokesman for the Koret Foundation during its dispute with the founder's widow. Ballard was also a spokesman for the San Francisco Bay Area's bid for the 2024 Olympic and Paralympic Games. He was also the spokesman for Dede Wilsey during her campaign to remain the head of the Fine Arts Museums of San Francisco.

In 2018, Ballard was a spokesman for Anthony Levandowski, a central figure in a legal battle between Waymo and Uber that was called the "tech trial of the century." Levandowski later pled guilty to stealing trade secrets from Google. Ballard was allied with U.S. Senator Dianne Feinstein.

In 2021, the California Correctional Peace Officers' Association, Ballard's client, gave $1.75 million to a campaign against the recall of Newsom, making the union its largest contributor. In 2024, after CCPOA donated $2.9 million to Newsom's campaigns, Ballard denied criticism that the union had "outsized" influence on the governor.

== Personal life ==
Ballard was profiled in San Francisco's "The Power Issue." He was recognized as one of San Francisco's "preeminent media whisperers" with "a junkyard dog persona." In 2019, he was recognized as a "gamechanger" by University of California College of the Law, San Francisco. He has four children and lives in Mill Valley, California.

In December 2020, Ballard was charged with domestic violence in Napa County. In August, 2021, he pled no contest to two misdemeanors in a settlement deal with prosectors.
