= Francis J. Ahern =

San Francisco Police Chief

Francis J. Ahern (1899–1958) was the San Francisco Police Chief from January 1956 to September 1958.

Appointed by mayor George Christopher's police commission, Ahern, with the rank of patrolman, was elevated to chief over every captain, lieutenant and sergeant on the force. Ahern's rank was deceptive, as he had been passed over for promotion time and time again because, it was said, he wouldn't go along with corrupt police leadership. He was actually head of both the homicide and rackets details with the title of Inspector, which was not a civil service title. He also spent time as an investigator for Estes Kefauver's anti-crime Kefauver hearings.

Christopher was intent on cleaning up the police force and had given an ultimatum to the previous mayor's chief, George Healy. After an embarrassing gambling raid by federal agents next door to the old Hall of Justice on Kearney Street of which Healy claimed no prior knowledge, the newly appointed police commission accepted Healy's resignation and Ahern was tapped for the top job.

Ahern's first move was to transfer every district captain; then he moved every twenty lieutenants to new assignments. Next, he transferred one hundred of the department's 200+ sergeants. Then he began the reform of the traffic bureau. Police were expected to close gambling and vice operations in their districts and the old excuse of not knowing was no longer accepted. At some point, Ahern's zealousness caused the mayor and the department some embarrassment when he tried to close down Bridge clubs. Mayor Christopher pulled him off of this effort.

In September 1958, Ahern died of a heart attack at a Baseball game at Seals Stadium. His funeral was held in the rotunda of City Hall. A half block alley on the north side of the San Francisco Hall of Justice that opens onto Sixth Street is named for Francis Ahern.
