= Livermore Sanitarium =

Former sanitarium (1895–1965)

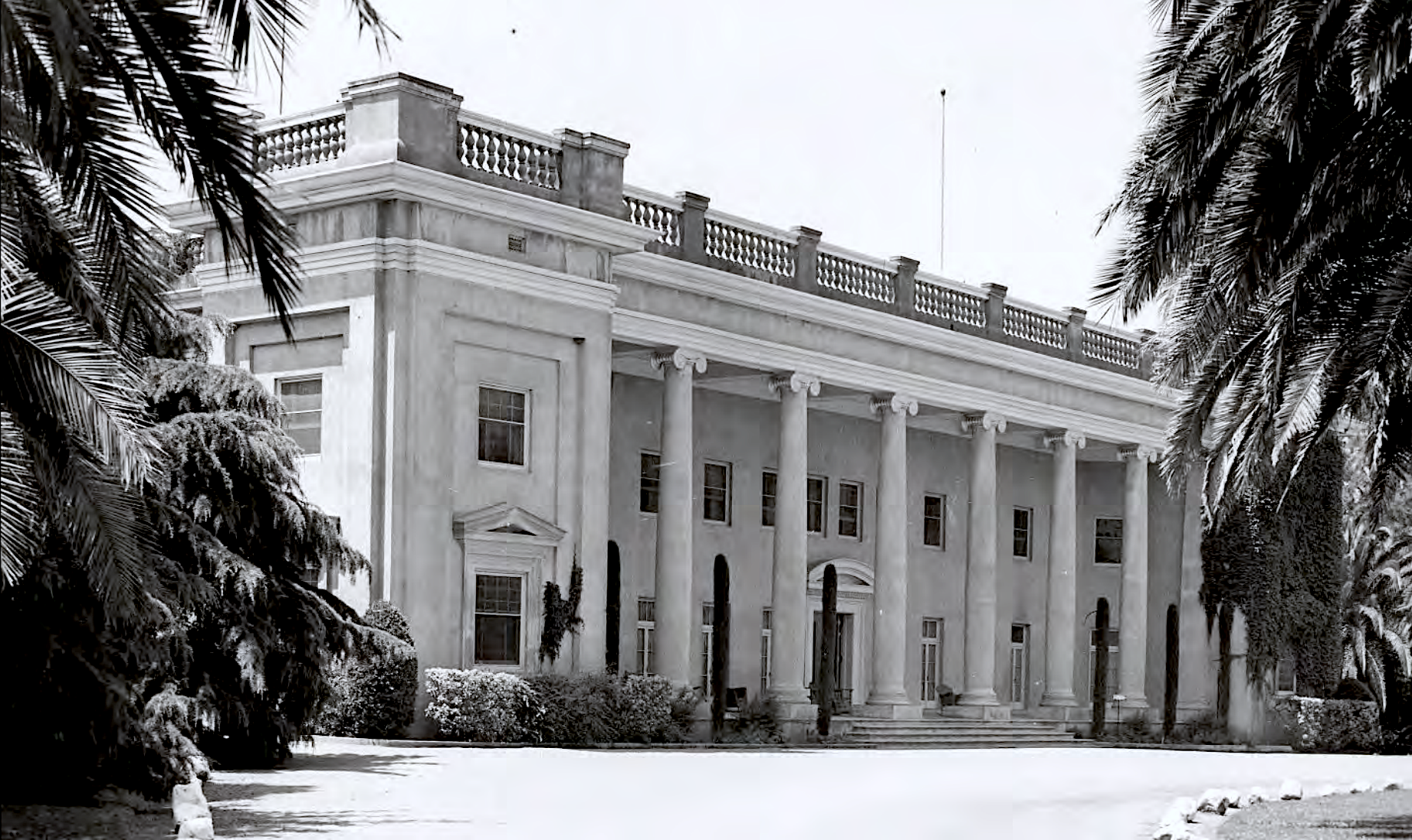
- The hydrotherapy building (1904) at the Livermore Sanitarium

Geography
- Location: Livermore, California, United States
- Coordinates: 37°40′28″N 121°45′16″W

Organization
- Type: Specialist

Services
- Speciality: Psychiatry

History
- Opened: 1894
- Closed: 1965

Links
- Lists: Hospitals in California

Livermore Sanitarium was a private sanitarium and psychiatric hospital, located in Livermore, California, in operation from 1894 until 1965. The facility specialized the treatment and research of alcoholism and mental disorders. During this time period the Livermore Valley was considered an ideal climate for optimizing one's health.

== History ==
The Livermore Sanitarium was founded by Dr. John W. Robertson, he had previously worked at Napa State Hospital in the alcohol treatment clinic. The main facility building was the former William Mendenhall Estate on College Avenue in Livermore; previously owned by one of the founders of the town, William Martin Mendenhall (1823–1911); and another facility building located next door was the former Livermore Collegiate Institute (also known as the Old Livermore College). In June 1909, the college building burned down and was rebuilt. The grounds had separate cabins for the patients.

In 1904, he built a hydro-sanitarium facility, for water-based treatments and therapy.

In 1912, a gym was built that included exercise equipment, a swimming pool, and a bowling alley - during this time period it was an unusual to find such amenities at a medical facility. In September of the same year a fire destroyed the engine house and laundry building of the sanitarium. The cost of damages from this incident totaled to about $15,000.

By 1920, there were 120 patients. In the 1960s, new medical approaches to psychiatry were discovered and popularity of this type of hospital declined.

The sanitarium closed in 1965. The building has since been demolished.

== Incidents ==
On August 28, 1899 Lucien Godchaux of San Francisco reportedly died of heart problems after escaping the sanitarium a few days prior. Godchaux had been committed to the asylum due to a nervous disorder.

In 1911 the Sanitarium was sued by A. L. DeArman for injuries he sustained while a patient in 1909. The day after he was committed he was reportedly strapped to his bed in a straight jacket before being left unattended by staff. He managed to escape his confines and fell from the second floor, dislocating both wrists, breaking an arm, and injuring his hip, spine, and internal organs. He allegedly suffered from lower body paralysis due to the fall. DeArman won the suit against the hospital and was awarded $8,083.33. The verdict in the trial was unanimous for DeArman.

On July 23, 1928, George C. Roeding of the California Nursery Company was found dead by suicide near Arroyo del Valle. He was thought to be in recovery and had been permitted to leave the asylum independently to ride horseback. He had been committed due to a nervous breakdown.

== Notable Patients ==
- Durand Churchill, son of Albert Spalding
- George C. Roeding Sr., owner of California Nursery Company from 1917–1928

== See also ==
- List of hospitals in California
