= 2003 San Francisco mayoral election =

- November 4, 2003 (jungle primary); December 9, 2003 (runoff)
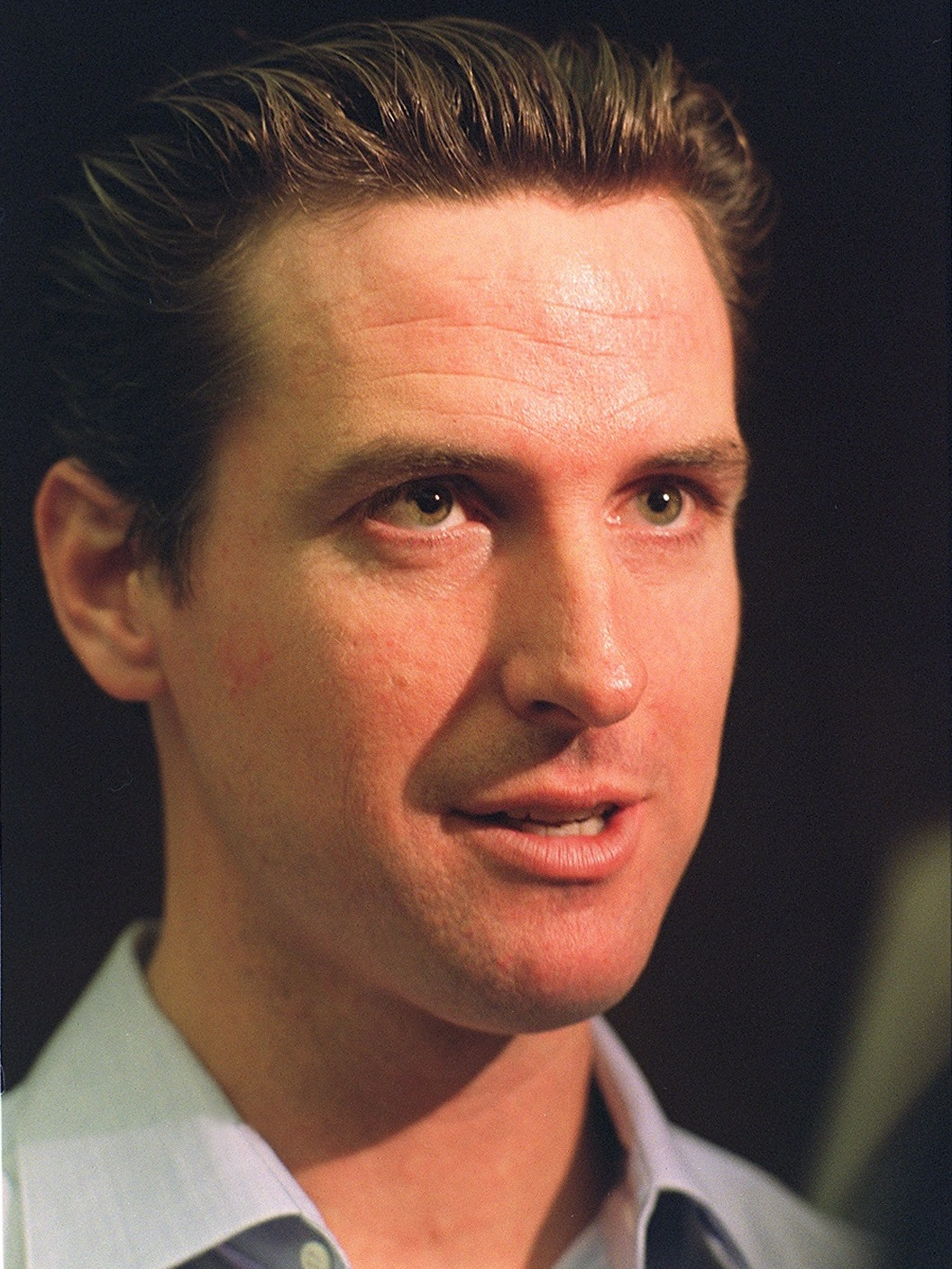

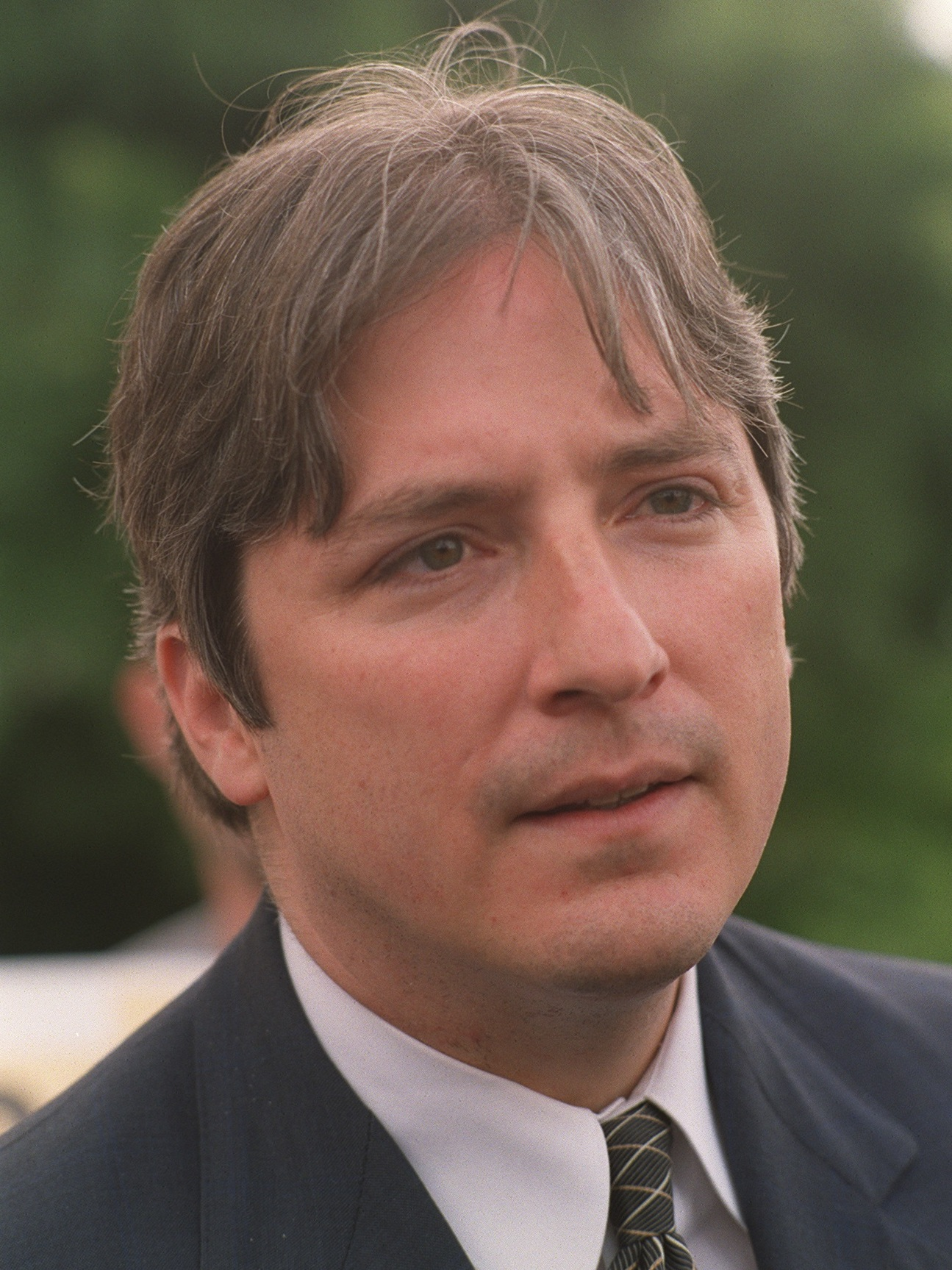

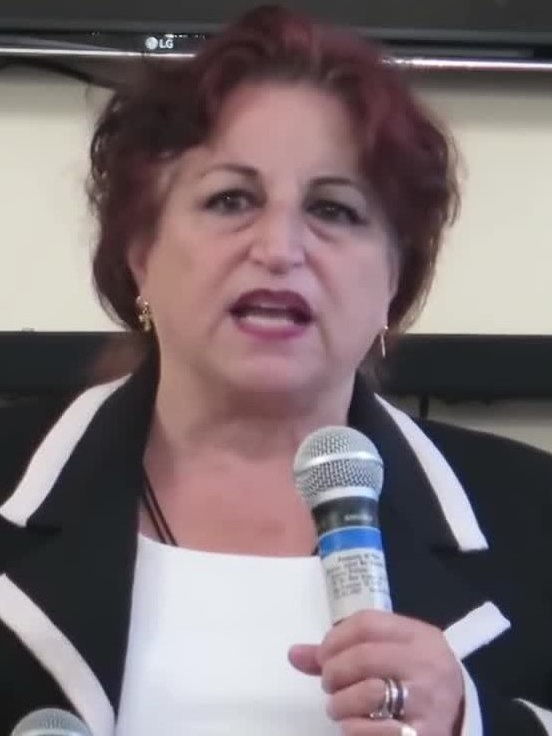

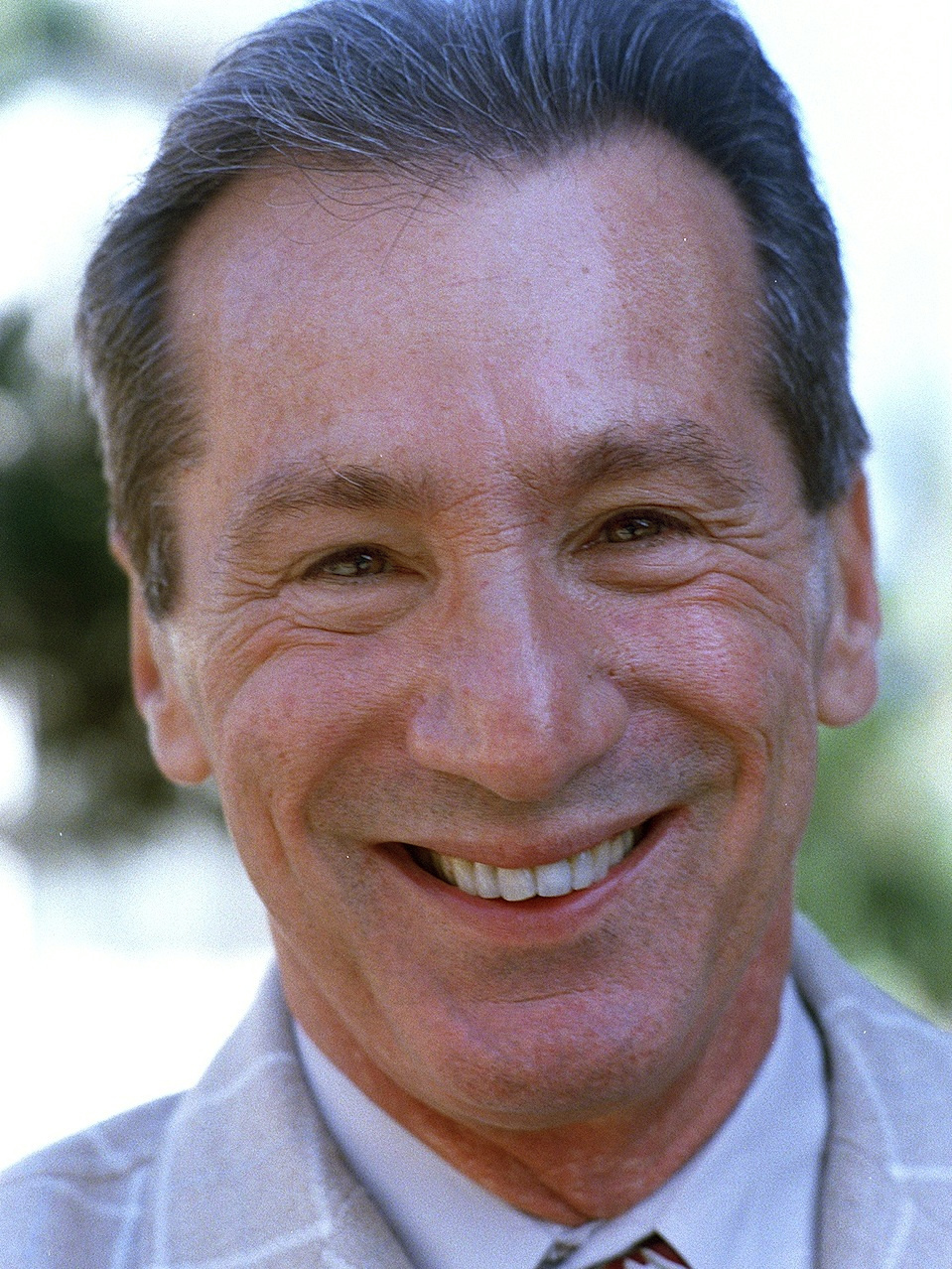

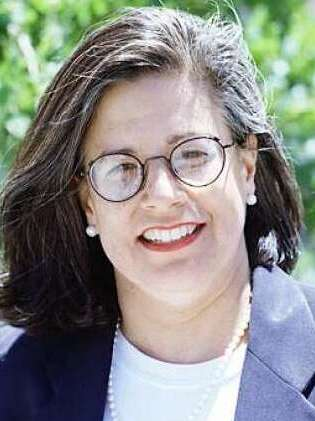
Candidate	Gavin Newsom	Matt Gonzalez	Angela Alioto
Party	Democratic	Green	Democratic
First round vote	87,196	40,714	33,446
First round percentage	41.92%	19.57%	16.08%
Runoff vote	133,546	119,329
Runoff percentage	52.81%	47.19%
Candidate	Tom Ammiano	Susan Leal
Party	Democratic	Democratic
First round vote	21,452	17,641
First round percentage	10.31%	8.48%
- Runoff electoral results by supervisorial district Newsom: 50–60% 60–70% 70–80% Gonzalez: 50–60% 60–70%
Mayor before election
Willie Brown
Democratic
Elected mayor
Gavin Newsom
Democratic

The 2003 San Francisco mayoral election occurred on November 4, 2003. The incumbent, Willie Brown, was termed out of office and could not seek a third term. The general election included three top candidates including then Supervisor Gavin Newsom and then president of the board of supervisors, Matt Gonzalez and former supervisor Angela Alioto. No candidate received the required majority, so the race went into a run-off of the two top candidates, which were Gavin Newsom and Matt Gonzalez. The run-off occurred on December 9, 2003, where Gavin Newsom was elected mayor of San Francisco.

Municipal elections in California are officially non-partisan, though most candidates in San Francisco do receive funding and support from various political parties.

In 2003, then-supervisor Gavin Newsom, a Democrat, ran in a large field of challengers, including Board of Supervisors President Matt Gonzalez, Supervisor Tom Ammiano, former supervisor Angela Alioto, city treasurer Susan Leal, and former police chief Tony Ribera. Newsom and Gonzalez took first and second place, respectively, but neither won a majority, so the two advanced to a runoff election.

Newsom ran as a moderate against leftist/progressive Gonzalez, a member of the Green Party. It was the first mayoral election in San Francisco that a Green Party candidate took a noticeable amount of the vote. The election was close, with Gonzalez leading in the polls and winning the popular vote among ballots cast on election day, while Newsom had a larger lead on absentee ballots. The strong showing of the Green Party's performance can somewhat be attributed to Peter Camejo making a rare second-place finish in San Francisco County behind incumbent Democratic governor Gray Davis and ahead of Republican Bill Simon in the 2002 California gubernatorial election, a year prior.

Newsom would later be elected Governor of California in 2018 and 2022. Also, future Vice President Kamala Harris was concurrently elected San Francisco District Attorney on the same ballot.

== Polling ==
Poll source	Date(s) administered	Sample size (Note: Key: A – all adults RV – registered voters LV – likely voters CV – certain voters V – unclear)	Margin of error	Matt Gonzalez (G)	Gavin Newsom (D)	Other / Undecided
SurveyUSA	December 2–4, 2003	534 (CV)	± 4.3%	50%	48%	2%

== Results ==
San Francisco mayoral election, 2003
Party	Candidate	Votes	%
Democratic	Gavin Newsom	87,196	41.92
Green	Matt Gonzalez	40,714	19.57
Democratic	Angela Alioto	33,446	16.08
Democratic	Tom Ammiano	21,452	10.31
Democratic	Susan Leal	17,641	8.48
Republican	Tony Ribera	5,015	2.41
Libertarian	Michael F. Denny	925	0.44
Independent	Roger E. Schulke	735	0.36
Independent	Jim Reid	733	0.35
Write-in		131	0.06
Total votes		208,028	100.00
Runoff election
Democratic	Gavin Newsom	133,546	52.81
Green	Matt Gonzalez	119,329	47.19
Total votes		252,875	100.00
