= Anthony Ribera =

American police chief

Chief of Department of the San Francisco Police Department
- Preceded by: Richard Hongisto
- Succeeded by: Fred H. Lau

Personal details
- Born: January 25, 1945 (age 81) San Francisco, California

Military service
- Rank: Chief of Department

Anthony "Tony" Ribera (born January 25, 1945) is the former Police chief of the City and County of San Francisco.

== Early life and education ==
Ribera grew up in San Francisco's Richmond District where he attended George Washington High School and went on to earn a Ph.D in Public Administration from Golden Gate University. He also attended Sacred Heart High School, and served in the U.S. Army

== Chief of Police ==
As Chief of Police, Ribera was known for his hair-trigger temper and aggressive "my way or the highway" approach which was detested in the Department. Deputy Chief Frank Reed responded to an interview about Ribera's style saying "Yes, we have had very lively and spirited discussions both in our private conferences and in other places, as well. The chief is very hard of hearing in his left ear so everything he says is in a loud tone."

=== Sexual harassment allegations ===
In Ribera's second year as Chief of Police, department spokeswoman Joanne Welsh accused Ribera of pressuring her for sexual favors following her firing from the Police Department's Public Affairs Office in 1993. Ribera denied the allegations and any rumors of him stepping down as Chief. In 1995, Ribera and the San Francisco Police Department ultimately won the court battle on Joanne Welsh's sexual harassment allegation but lost on her claim of gender bias, with the jury agreeing she had suffered emotional distress and awarding her $56,835 in damages.

== 2003 Mayoral race ==
Ribera ran as the sole Republican in the November 2003 Mayoral Race, finishing in sixth place with 2.4% of the vote.

== Retirement ==
After the mayoral race, Ribera retired from San Francisco politics and is now an assistant professor at the University of San Francisco where he teaches law enforcement.
