= Dumpville =

Historical neighborhood in San Francisco

Coordinates: 37.7723°N 122.3978°W

San Francisco's Dumpville was a permanent village along the shores of Mission Bay that existed from the 1860s until 1895. Dumpville was an early refuse site on Southern Pacific Railroad land, a loosely structured community of mostly men, not unlike dump sites across the planet. It was on the shore of Mission Creek, the waters called "poverty lake."

Dumpville was a location where poor people lived in makeshift housing and sifted through the trash for items that had some value, cans, cloth, metal, bottles and utensils.

When the city needed land for a rail yard and wished to push crime and poverty further away from town, a murder was the pretext for a police crackdown. On November 9, 1895, a troop of twenty police from the southern district under the command of Captain John Spillane marched down sixth street late at night, burned the shanties and evicted the scavengers from the site which was quickly filled to be used as part of the huge southern Pacific railroad yards along Channel Street.

After the 1906 earthquake, San Francisco needed dumping ground for the massive debris from the burned district. Contractors were engaged to remove the rubble. The California Board of State Harbor Commissioners offered space behind the seawall planned for the north side of Mission Creek but they asked land owners to keep the rubble on their lots until the Seawall construction began later that summer.

The site was later developed as a biotech campus for the University of California, San Francisco.

== Sources ==
San Francisco Call November 11, 1895 *
