= William J. Quinn =

- Born: 23 April 1883; San Francisco, California, U.S.
- Died: 10 October 1963 (aged 80); Livermore Sanitarium, Livermore, California, U.S.
- Resting place: Holy Cross Cemetery, Colma, California, U.S. 37°40′16″N 122°26′43″W
- Education: Lincoln Grammar School; Sacred Heart College; Saint Ignatius College; (now the University of San Francisco)
- Known for: Chief of Police of San Francisco
- Notable work: Modernization of the SFPD, establishment of the juvenile bureau, radios in police cars
- Police career
- Country: San Francisco Police Department (SFPD)
- Allegiance: United States
- Department: San Francisco Police Department
- Status: Deceased

William J. Quinn (April 23, 1883 – October 10, 1963) was a San Francisco Police Department (SFPD) chief. A native of San Francisco, California, he attended Lincoln Grammar School, Sacred Heart College and studied law at Saint Ignatius College (now the University of San Francisco), graduating in 1925. He walked his first police beat in 1906.

He served as chief of police in San Francisco from January 1, 1929, until February 15, 1940. Quinn presided over the modernization of the SFPD and is credited with establishing the first juvenile bureau and putting radios in police cars. He was chief during the 1932 trial of the-then public defender of the city and county of San Francisco Frank Egan for the murder of Mrs. Jesse Scott Hughes, and the 1934 San Francisco General Strike on the waterfront where he took a rock to the head, and during the period of the investigations by Edwin Atherton who published the Atherton Report on police graft and corruption.

Quinn died on October 10, 1963, at the Livermore Sanitarium. He was interred at Holy Cross Cemetery in Colma, California.
