= Heather Fong =

American police chief

Heather J. Fong
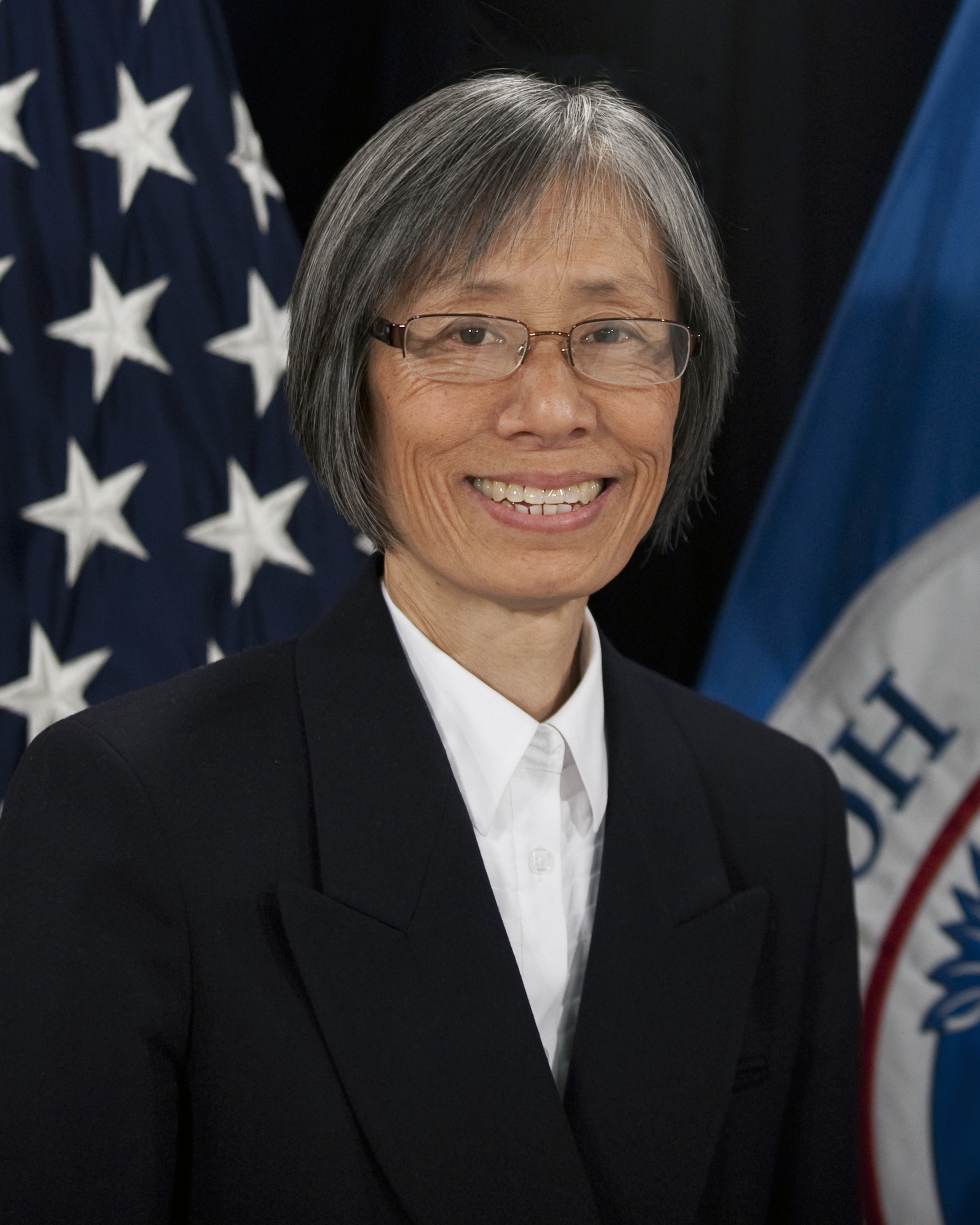
- Fong in 2014
- Born: 1956 (age 69–70); San Francisco, California
- Education: University of San Francisco (BA); SF State (MSW); Air Force Reserve Officer Training Corps
- Police career
- Department: San Francisco Police Department
- Service years: 1977–2009
- Rank: Sworn in as a Police Officer – 1977; Commander – August 1998; Deputy Chief – June 2000; Assistant Chief of Police – May 2003; Acting Chief of Police – January 22, 2004; Chief of Police – April 14, 2004
- Badge no.: 2020

Heather Jeanne Fong (Chinese: 方宇文; pinyin: Fāng Yǔwén, born 1956) is an American security official and the former chief of police for San Francisco, California, United States from 2004 to 2009. She is the first woman to lead the San Francisco Police Department, and the first Asian American woman to head a major metropolitan city police force. She is also the second Asian American police chief in SFPD history, the other being Fred Lau.

Fong served as the assistant secretary for state and local law enforcement in the Department of Homeland Security from July 31, 2023. to January 20, 2025. She previously served in the same role from November 17, 2014 through the end of the Obama administration.

== Early life and education ==
Her ancestral roots are in Ho Chung village, Chung Shan County (now in Zhongshan City), Guangdong Province, China.

In high school, Fong joined the Police Athletic League's cadet academy for two years. She graduated from St. Rose Academy in Western Addition, San Francisco in 1974.

Fong grew up in the North Beach neighborhood of San Francisco and holds a Bachelor of Arts degree from the University of San Francisco and a Master of Social Work degree from San Francisco State University. In college, Fong was a member of the United States Air Force ROTC and worked as a police cadet.

Fong graduated from the police academy on August 15, 1977. At the time, the San Francisco Police Department was under pressure to hire more minorities and women, as they had only two Asian American officers and no female officers in 1974.

== Law enforcement career ==
Shortly after graduating from the police academy, Fong was put on the Golden Dragon massacre case. She transferred to the police academy in 1979 as an instructor. She was placed as one of two female child abuse investigators in 1983 and then worked in the department's planning and community outreach department starting in 1986. In 1992, she worked one year as a youth investigator.

She was promoted to lieutenant in 1993, captain in 1994, commander in 1998, deputy chief in 2000, and assistant chief in 2003. In 1996, Chief Fred Lau assigned Fong to captain the department's Central Station, which oversees Chinatown, North Beach, Union Square and the Financial District.

Fong was assigned to the Special Operations Division in August 1998 when she was promoted to commander. While there, she was responsible for the Traffic, Tactical, and MUNI Transit companies. In June 2000, upon promotion to deputy chief, she was assigned to the Field Operations Bureau, where she managed the uniformed patrol personnel of the San Francisco Police Department. In August 2002, she was assigned to oversee the Administration Bureau. In May 2003, she was appointed assistant chief of police.

=== Chief of Police ===
Mayor Gavin Newsom was impressed with Fong's performance during Fajitagate. After reassigning Alex Fagan Sr., Newsom appointed Fong acting chief of police on January 22, 2004, and chief of police on April 14, 2004.

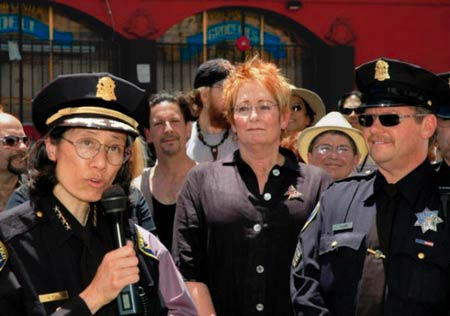
Heather Fong (left), with Theresa Sparks (center) and Sgt. Stephan Thorne commemorate the Compton's Cafeteria riot.

Fong drew criticism in June 2008 for failing to complete firearm recertification for over five years though all San Francisco police officers are required to recertify annually by department regulations. Fong was quoted as saying that she was too busy to recertify. When the controversy erupted in the local media, she was recertified a week later.

In September of that year, Fong became embroiled in a promotion scandal and faced pushback from SFPD rank and file over her controversial plan to cut the rank of Inspector (equivalent to Detective). About 53 San Francisco police officers filed a complaint with the Civil Service Commission. They tested for Q-35 jobs as Inspectors 10 years prior, but Fong has decided to eliminate that position, and fill those investigative roles with Q-50 Sergeants who tested in 2006. 40 to 50 percent of the knowledge and abilities needed for an Inspector were not covered by the Sergeants test. Over the weekend just before Monday, September 22nd, the San Francisco Police Commission strongly disapproved of Fong hastily rushing through at least 35 appointments of Sergeants to Inspector positions. The Commission in a swift rebuke, determined Fong was incorrect. They officially rejected her plan on the 22nd and ruled that personnel from the 1998 Q-35 Inspectors list should have been hired instead of Sergeants. Litigation was ongoing for the plaintiff officers, 39 in total and many part of the original Civil Service Commission complaint are now retired. The City and County of San Francisco along with the SF Board of Supervisors signed off on a settlement in 2021 relating to the class action litigation for $480,000.

=== Retirement ===
Fong announced in December 2008 that she would be stepping down in April 2009, after serving five years as San Francisco's police chief.

Fong receives some $264,000 annually in pension payments. The high amount of pension payments to Fong and other retired top officials in San Francisco's police and fire departments has prompted critical comment.

== See also ==
- San Francisco Police Department
- San Francisco Police Officers Association

Police appointments
Preceded by Alex Fagan	Chief of San Francisco Police Department; 2004–2009	Succeeded by George Gascón
