= Fajitagate =

Californian political scandal

- Location: San Francisco, California, United States
- Type: Series of legal and political incidents
- Cause: Street fight
- First reporter: San Francisco Chronicle
- Participants: Alex Fagan Jr., David Lee, Matt Tonsing, Adam Snyder and Jade Santoro

Fajitagate was a series of legal and political incidents in San Francisco, California. It began with a street fight outside a neighborhood bar between three off-duty San Francisco police officers and two local residents over a bag of fajitas, leading to numerous civil and criminal complaints, police misconduct allegations and eventually, the resignation of the city's Chief of Police and Deputy Chief of Police.

== Incident ==
On November 20, 2002, as reported the next day in the San Francisco Chronicle, San Francisco residents Adam Snyder and Jade Santoro were approached as they were leaving the Blue Light bar by three men—later identified as Officer Alex Fagan Jr. (the son of Assistant Chief Alex Fagan), Officer David Lee and Officer Matt Tonsing—who demanded Snyder and Santoro give them their box of takeout food. When they refused, the off-duty police officers physically attacked them. Santoro was seriously injured, suffering a broken nose and a concussion.

Snyder called 9-1-1 on his cellphone and reported that Santoro was being beaten. He identified the attackers to the responding officers as three men who drove past the scene in a white pickup truck. The pickup was stopped and the three off-duty officers were identified, questioned, and released. No arrests were made that night.

== Scandal ==
The scandal subsequently expanded and would take until 2005 to reach a resolution. Accused police officer Alex Fagan Jr. was the son of San Francisco Police Department Assistant Chief (later Chief) Alex Fagan. It was subsequently alleged by San Francisco District Attorney Terence Hallinan that the elder Fagan, Chief Prentice E. Sanders, and nine other officers were involved in a coverup of the initial criminal acts of the three off-duty officers. Sanders and nine other senior officers were indicted by Hallinan and arrested on February 28, 2003, for the crime of obstruction of justice. Sanders took a leave of absence due to the charges and Alex Fagan Sr., the next most senior officer, automatically became the acting chief. Fagan resigned in early 2004 and was replaced by Heather Fong.

== Trials ==
=== Criminal ===
The court cases against senior police staff continued through 2003. Hallinan dropped charges against Chief Sanders on March 11, as he was unable to prove a conspiracy had existed. Charges were dropped against almost all the other defendants on April 4, 2003. A key ruling in the case was that under California law, obstruction of justice required that there be an active conspiracy of persons who agreed to subvert justice, not merely an individual or set of individuals acting on their own. Hallinan originally claimed such a conspiracy but phone and office logs established that there could not have been any significant collusion. Hallinan publicly called for the law to be amended to allow individuals to be charged for independent actions.

Later in 2003 and throughout 2004, most of the senior officers, including Sanders, pursued legal appeals to clear their names of the underlying factual claims regarding the obstruction. Sanders and several others were eventually cleared by courts. Sanders took early retirement, which he claimed was from the stress from the investigation.

Criminal court cases in the original beating against Fagan and Lee were resolved in 2004 and 2005. Lee was found not guilty on November 21, 2004, and Fagan was found not guilty on March 28, 2005.

Many officers were charged by the Office of Citizen Complaints for misconduct in the incident. In March 2007, Inspector Paul Falconer and Lieutenant Henry Para successfully challenged their misconduct charges in a closed hearing of the Police Commission. They were exonerated of all the charges brought against them. In March 2007, many of the officers charged by the Office of Citizen Complaints made deals, with the San Francisco Police Commission, for time off. At the end of the hearing, one police commissioner stated that it appeared that none of the officers charged had done anything wrong.

=== Civil ===
On June 12, 2006, a civil jury found Fagan and police officer Matt Tonsing liable for damages suffered in the beating and awarded plaintiff Jade Santoro $36,500 in damages. The jury found for Tonsing but against Fagan and awarded Snyder $9,500. The jury completely exonerated Lee.

A federal court dismissed a civil rights lawsuit against the City of San Francisco in 2006, a decision upheld on appeal in July 2008, on the basis that the plaintiffs had not shown at trial that any police policy or practice was to blame for the officers' conduct.
