= Alex Fagan =

American police chief

Alex Emanuel Fagan
- Born: 2 November 1950; Sherman, Texas, USA
- Died: 8 November 2010 (aged 60); London, England, UK
- Police career
- Department: San Francisco Police Department
- Rank: Chief (2003–2004)

Alex Emanuel Fagan (2 November 1950 – 8 November 2010) was the Chief of the San Francisco Police Department from March 2003 until January 2004.

== Biography ==
Fagan was born in Sherman, Texas and raised in the tiny (1950 population 1,147) East Bay community of Pinole, California, attended schools in Richmond, California. From 1968 to 1971, Fagan attended Contra Costa College in San Pablo, and graduated from UC Berkeley in 1973 with a bachelor's degree in criminology. He joined the San Francisco Police Department in 1973 as a patrol officer. He was promoted to Inspector in 1979, while also earning a Masters' from San Jose State University. Fagan worked in the Narcotics unit for 13 years and later in the Homicide detail, was assigned to an organized-crime task-force, ran the Northern Station, and as Captain was the department's chief financial officer.

Fagan was also on the Board of Directors of the San Francisco Police Officers' Association.

He was awarded three silver and five bronze medals of valor. In 1976, he helped save 30 men from a fire at a gay bathhouse. In 1979, he swam 200 yards into San Francisco Bay to save a suicidal woman.

He was appointed by San Francisco Mayor Willie Brown as acting police chief in March 2003 and chief in August 2003. In January 2004, newly elected Mayor Gavin Newsom removed Fagan as chief and put him in charge of the city's emergency services office.

Fagan died in November 2010, collapsing while walking his dog on a street in London, England. Fagan had moved to London to join his partner who had recently been transferred to Britain.

== Problem behaviors ==
In 1990, Fagan was suspended by the SFPD after an inebriated altercation with several members of the California Highway Patrol; in 2001 he was again suspended after he left the scene of a 2000 automobile accident and was accused of DUI.

Fagan was investigated by Walnut Creek, California police in connection with the 1988 murder of SFPD officer Lester Garnier. Among the issues raised were his purchases of an expensive home and automobiles well in excess of those his SFPD pay would warrant, membership in the exclusive Olympic Club, and his relationship with a female IRS agent.

In November 2002, while Fagan was a deputy chief, two men reported that they had been attacked by a group of off-duty police officers, including Fagan's son, who was a rookie with the department. Fagan was charged by a grand jury with conspiring to cover up the incident, which became known as "Fajitagate." Fagan was ultimately cleared and the charges dismissed.

Police appointments
Preceded by Prentice E. Sanders	Chief of San Francisco Police Department; 2003–2004	Succeeded by Heather Fong
