= Charles W. Dullea =

San Francisco Chief of Police from 1940 to 1947

Charles W. Dullea (May 30, 1889 – May 31, 1966) was the Chief of Police in the San Francisco Police Department from 1940 to 1947.

== Early years ==
Dullea attended Franklin Grammar and Lowell High Schools. After service in the Marine Corps, Dullea joined the San Francisco police force in 1914. In 1924, he was a police sergeant assigned to the Auto Detail's Shotgun Squad, a mobile police car unit assigned to patrol during night hours for motorized bandits. By 1929, he was Captain of Inspectors under William J. Quinn, serving during Prohibition, and later became a Captain of Detectives.

== Tenure as Chief of Police ==
Dullea was appointed Chief in 1940 by Mayor Angelo Rossi. In 1941, Dullea ordered the San Francisco Police Department to assist in the roundup of Japanese-Americans for transport to internment camps, confiscating minor personal possessions; in February 1942 Dullea said his department was holding 6,000 radios and cameras taken from Japanese-Americans. During the war years Dullea presided over a police force diminished by conscription. In response, Dullea enlisted a police auxiliary consisting of 2,500 men and women, who were given a crash course in police work and trained in the use of firearms to assist in traffic duties and security at sporting events as well as crime prevention. With increased numbers of servicemen visiting San Francisco on leave, the department reported increases in the number of criminal incidents including drunk-and-disorderly charges, which Chief Dullea blamed on the increased number of servicemen on leave in San Francisco. On August 14, 1945, after President Truman announced the end of the war on nationwide radio, soldiers and seamen on leave in the city poured out of the city's saloons to celebrate in the street, resulting in a four-day "Peace Riot" of fights, gang rapes, looting and vandalism, leaving 11 people dead (including a municipal streetcar driver) and 1000 injured. After the deadliest riot in the city's history, Chief Dullea publicly expressed his disgust with what he termed, "the unbridled and unrestrained acts of a lot of undisciplined men in uniform." Others blamed Chief Dullea for having no prepared plan to deal with the violence.

After the war, Dullea used his position as Chief of Police to call for greater gun control efforts, including urging WWII veterans to turn in or dispose of their war souvenir firearms, and urged Hollywood filmmakers to publicize such efforts. Dullea served as president of the California Peace Officers Association (CPOA) from 1944 to 1945.

== Later years ==
Upon retirement from SFPD in 1947, Dullea was appointed to the State Adult Authority by his good friend, Earl Warren who was then governor of California. In 1955, Dullea left the Adult Authority and became an executive with the Walkup Merchant Drayage firm. He was vice-president at the time of his death.

He was married and Charles and Winifred had three sons, the Reverend Charles W. Dullea Jr, at one time president of the University of San Francisco, the Reverend John S. Dullea of San Jose and attorney Edward D. Dullea.

Dullea died of a brain hemorrhage in 1966 en route to the South End Rowing Club for his daily handball workout. A mass at Saint Ignatius Church was held followed by interment at Holy Cross Cemetery, Colma, California.
