= Fred Lau =

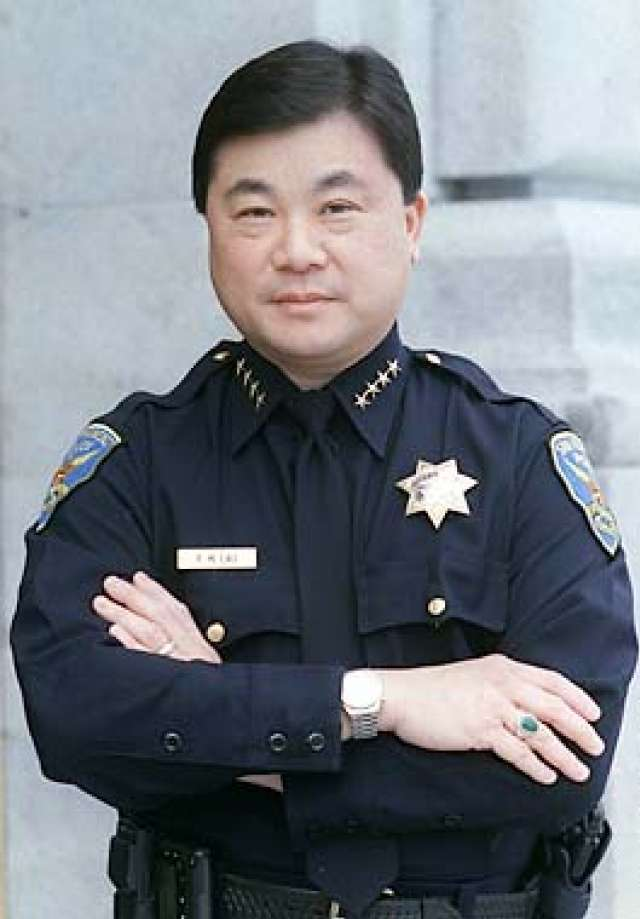
- Born: Fred Harry Lau; June 26, 1949 (age 77); San Francisco, California, U.S.
- Education: City College of San Francisco; San Francisco State University (B.A.)

Chinese name
- Traditional Chinese: 劉百安
- Simplified Chinese: 刘百安
Transcriptions
Standard Mandarin
- Hanyu Pinyin: Liú Bǎi Ān
Yue: Cantonese
- Jyutping: Lau^{4} Baak^{3} On^{1}

Fred Harry Lau (born June 26, 1949) is a former Chief of Police for San Francisco, having served from 1996–2002. He was the first Asian American to ever hold that position, and has been called the first Chinese-American to lead the police in any major American city. In 2013, he became the TSA Federal Security Director of the San Francisco International Airport.

== Biography ==
=== Early life and education ===
A third-generation San Franciscan and Cantonese speaker, Lau was born at San Francisco Chinese Hospital in Chinatown, San Francisco; he grew up in and around his family's business (Wing Duck Import/Export) on Grant Avenue in Chinatown. He attended Garfield Elementary and Francisco Middle schools, graduating from Galileo High School. As a teenager, he participated in the American Friends Service Committee anti-gang Youth for Service program. He attended and graduated from City College of San Francisco, and eventually obtained a Bachelor of Arts in 1997 from San Francisco State University.

=== San Francisco Police ===
After successfully challenging a 5'8" height requirement in 1970, Lau entered the SF Police Academy in 1971 and joined the San Francisco Police Department following graduation, becoming the fifth Chinese-American member of the SFPD. It is not documented whether Lau participated in the 1975 police-officers strike, although supervisors, inspectors and African-American officers were non-participants. He became an inspector-sergeant, eventually rising to head the SFPD Bureau of Inspectors. As a lieutenant, he headed the sniper unit. In 1977, he was assigned to the SFPD Gang Task Force after the Golden Dragon Massacre. Lau served on the SFPD Discharge Review Board until 1995; this panel came under severe scrutiny in San Francisco Examiner articles for failing to hold officers accountable in police-involved shootings.

=== Police Chief ===
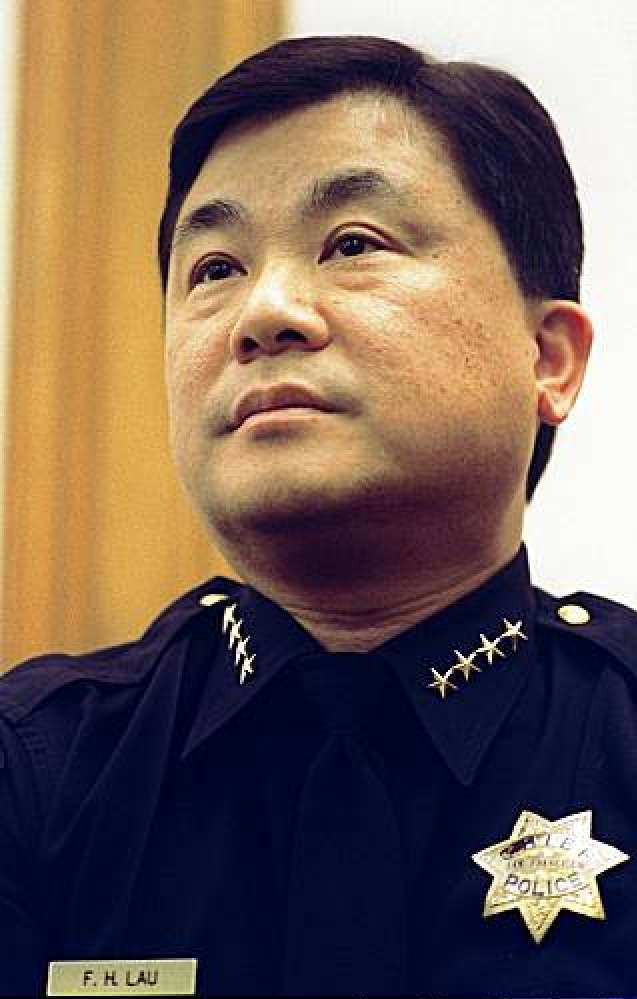
Fred Lau as police chief.

In 1996, as one of new Mayor Willie Brown's first official moves, Lau was appointed as the first Asian-American chief of the 2,300-man department; possibly as a result of lobbying by AsianWeek publishers who supported Brown and Terrence Hallinan during the elections. Chinatown activist Rose Pak threatened to withdraw support for the S.F. Giants' proposed Pac Bell Park if Mayor Brown didn't fire a political consultant hostile to Lau.

Lau served six years as chief from 1996–2002. Among Lau's successes as chief have been mentioned the implementation of domestic violence and hate-crimes units, as well as a crackdown on extortion in Chinatown. He appointed fellow Gang Task Force member (and future SFPD chief) Heather Fong to be captain of SFPD Central Station. San Francisco Chronicle ran a series of articles criticizing the SFPD and Lau's leadership for nationally worst performance in solving violent crimes; at the time Lau claimed that contractual seniority-based work rules and lack of off-hours justice solutions were key factors for the poor results. Lau was also associated with initiating and promulgating the politically SFPD policy of arresting participants in the Critical Mass (cycling) demonstrations.

=== TSA ===
After leaving the SFPD in July 2002, he was sworn as Federal Security Director with the TSA, overseeing staff at Oakland, Stockton, Sonoma County, and Modesto airports. He oversaw implementation of security screening at Oakland in 2002, and explosive detection for checked-baggage in 2006. In July 2013, he became Federal Security Director for SFO.

=== Associations ===
Lau serves on the Advisory Board of the DHS Asian American Pacific Islander Network (DHS AAPIN), and is a senior advisor to the National Association of Asian American Law Enforcement Commanders.

Police appointments
Preceded by Anthony Ribera	Chief of San Francisco Police Department; 1996–2002	Succeeded by Prentice E. Sanders
