= San Francisco Police Officers Association =

San Francisco police union

- Location: United States
- Members: 2,200
- Website: sfpoa.org

The San Francisco Police Officers Association (SFPOA) is the largest police union representing the San Francisco Police Department, with around 2,200 members as of 2016. It was founded in 1946 and by the late 1980s had around 1,750 members, amounting to the majority of San Francisco police officers. As of 2025, its president is Louis Wong.

== Advocacy history ==
On February 12, 2006, the head of the San Francisco Police Officers Association said that Mayor Gavin Newsom showed "a complete and total lack of respect for the rank and file" in his response to a San Francisco Chronicle series examining San Francisco officers' use of force. In October 2006, the vice president of the San Francisco Police Officers Association, Kevin Martin, was issued a restraining order from Susan Leff, an attorney for San Francisco's police watchdog agency. Both assemblywoman Fiona Ma and Mayor Gavin Newsom have been endorsed by the San Francisco Police Officers Association in part due to their opposition to legislation that would increase Californians' access to police disciplinary records by rolling back a 2006 California Supreme Court ruling.

In 2016, the SFPOA hired political communications expert Nathan Ballard for what was described as a "counterattack" against police reform attempts following the controversial killing of Mario Woods by officers and concerns about racism in the city's police department. The union's campaign against reform proponent George Gascón was criticized for using exaggerated crime figures, and Ballard acknowledged having misread the rates.

In the 2015/2016 debate about the introduction of body cameras for officers, the union achieved what acting SFPD chief Toney Chaplin described as a "huge concession", allowing an officer involved in a shooting to view the footage before giving a full report. While civil rights activists opposed this policy as detrimental to the cameras' purpose of increasing accountability, SFPOA president Martin Halloran justified it on the grounds that officers' memory could be affected by stress in such situations and that not allowing them to check their recollection with the video recording would expose them to "gotcha" moments.

== See also ==
- List of events in the history of the San Francisco Police Department
