= Kimberly Guilfoyle =

American diplomat and media personality (born 1969)

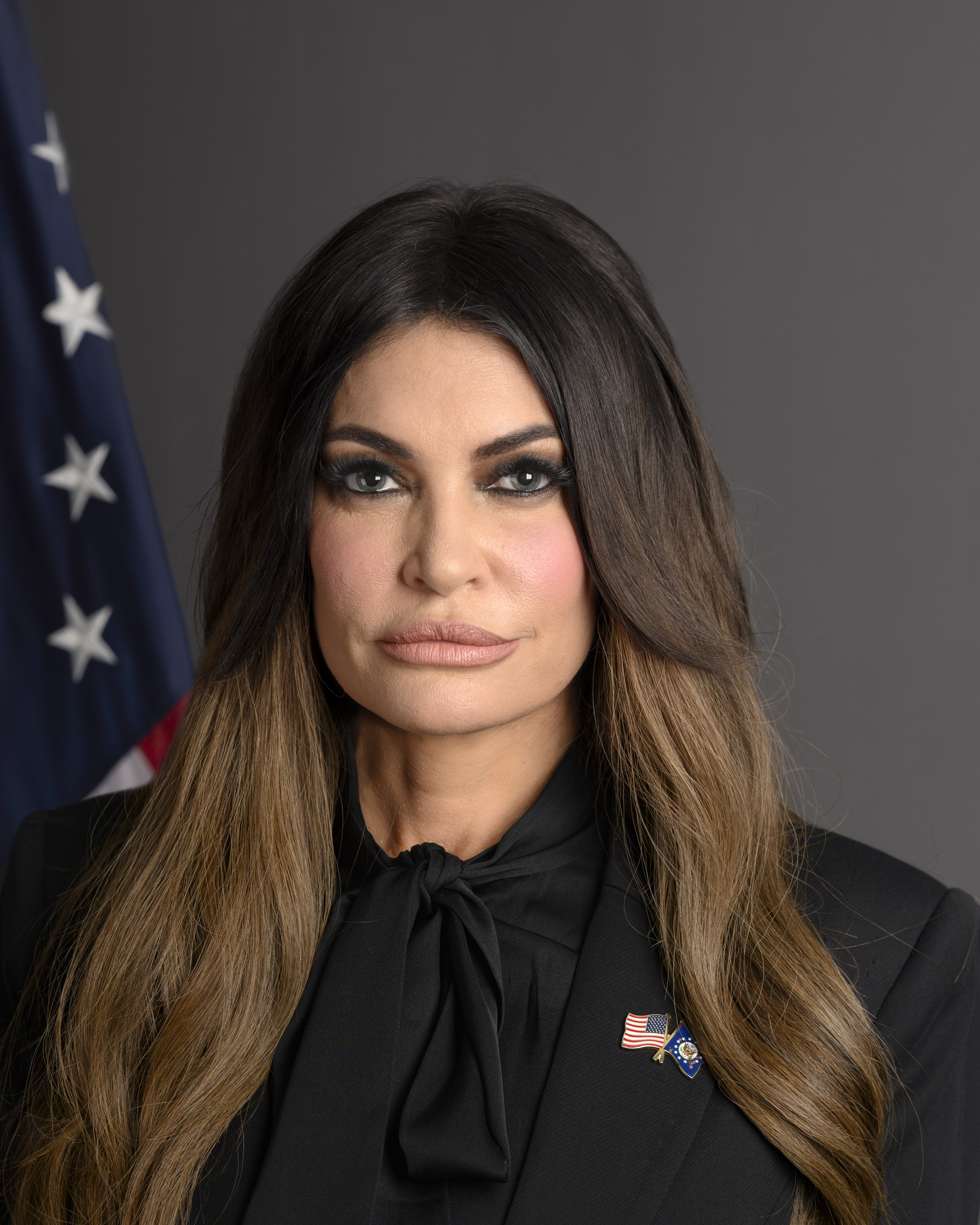
- Official portrait, 2025

27th United States Ambassador to Greece
- In office November 4, 2025 – October 13, 2026
- President: Donald Trump
- Preceded by: George James Tsunis
- Succeeded by: Josh Huck (chargé d'affaires)

First Lady of San Francisco
- In role January 8, 2004 – February 28, 2006
- Mayor: Gavin Newsom
- Preceded by: Blanche Vitero
- Succeeded by: Jennifer Siebel Newsom (Note: Role vacant from February 28, 2006, to July 26, 2008)

Personal details
- Born: Kimberly Ann Guilfoyle; March 9, 1969 (age 57) San Francisco, California, U.S.
- Party: Republican
- Spouses: Gavin Newsom (m. 2001; div. 2006) Eric Villency (m. 2006; div. 2009)
- Domestic partner: Donald Trump Jr. (2018–2024)
- Children: 1
- Education: University of California, Davis (BA); University of San Francisco (JD)
- Occupation: Lawyer; author; television news personality

Kimberly Ann Guilfoyle (/ˈɡɪlfɔɪl/ GHIL-foyl; born March 9, 1969) is an American media personality and politician who served as the United States ambassador to Greece from 2025 until her resignation in 2026. She previously served as an advisor and led the fundraising division of the Donald Trump 2020 presidential campaign.

Guilfoyle studied at University of California, Davis, and the University of San Francisco School of Law, where she earned a J.D. degree. She became a prosecuting attorney in San Francisco and Los Angeles, California. She was an assistant district attorney in San Francisco from 2000 to 2004. From 2001 to 2006, she was married to Democratic politician Gavin Newsom, and was first lady of San Francisco during Newsom's first two years as mayor of that city. She was the fiancée of Donald Trump Jr. from 2021 until they separated in late 2024.

Guilfoyle worked at Fox News from 2006 to 2018, and co-hosted The Five on the network. She later joined America First Policies, a pro-Trump super PAC, to campaign for Republicans in the 2018 midterm elections. On December 10, 2024, then-president-elect Donald Trump nominated her as the U.S. ambassador to Greece, and she was confirmed by the Senate on September 18, 2025. She resigned the position at Trump's request on October 13, 2026, following allegations of corruption, which Guilfoyle denied.

== Early life and education ==
Guilfoyle was born in San Francisco on March 9, 1969. Her father was an immigrant from Ireland and her mother was from Aguadilla, Puerto Rico. She was raised Catholic. She grew up in the Mission District of San Francisco and in Westlake, Daly City.

Guilfoyle's mother, Mercedes, taught special education. She died of leukemia when Guilfoyle was 11. Her father, Anthony "Tony" Guilfoyle, was born in Ennis, County Clare, Ireland, and emigrated to the United States in 1957 at the age of 20. In 1958, while still an Irish citizen, he was drafted and spent four years in the U.S. Army. After being discharged from the army, Tony Guilfoyle took up work in the construction trades. He later became a real estate investor. Until his death in 2008, he was a close advisor to his son-in-law Gavin Newsom, who was San Francisco mayor.

Guilfoyle graduated from San Francisco's Mercy High School, and then the University of California, Davis.

She received her Juris Doctor from the University of San Francisco School of Law in 1994. While in law school, she interned at the San Francisco district attorney's office. She also was a lingerie and fashion model, featured in local department stores' advertising campaigns (including Macy's) and modeling Victoria's Secret lingerie for a bridal magazine. She later studied at Trinity College Dublin in Ireland. While there, Guilfoyle attempted to publish research in international children's rights and European Economic Community law.

== Legal career ==
After law school, Guilfoyle taught in a public school district, and she briefly worked as a prosecutor in San Francisco. She lost her job in 1996 when Terence Hallinan was elected district attorney and fired 14 of the city's prosecutors. Guilfoyle worked for four years in Los Angeles as a deputy district attorney, serving on adult and juvenile cases. She received several awards at the Los Angeles District Attorney's Office, including Prosecutor of the Month.

In 2000, Guilfoyle was rehired by Hallinan in the San Francisco District Attorney's Office, where she was an assistant district attorney from 2000 to 2004. During this time she obtained a conviction while co-prosecuting with James Hammer in the 2002 case People v. Noel and Knoller, a second-degree murder trial involving a dog mauling, which received international attention.

In 2003, by which time her then-husband Gavin Newsom was the front-runner in the 2003 San Francisco mayoral election, Guilfoyle publicly accused her fellow assistant District Attorney Kamala Harris (who was running in the 2003 San Francisco District Attorney election) of being unwelcoming toward her. This accusation stemmed from a period years earlier, during Guilfoyle's re-hiring at the San Francisco district attorney's office. Harris denied this accusation. Guilfoyle did provide positive comments on Harris's qualifications for office; she called Harris someone who would "work very hard" if elected district attorney, as well as "very smart" and "a good speaker".

== Media career ==
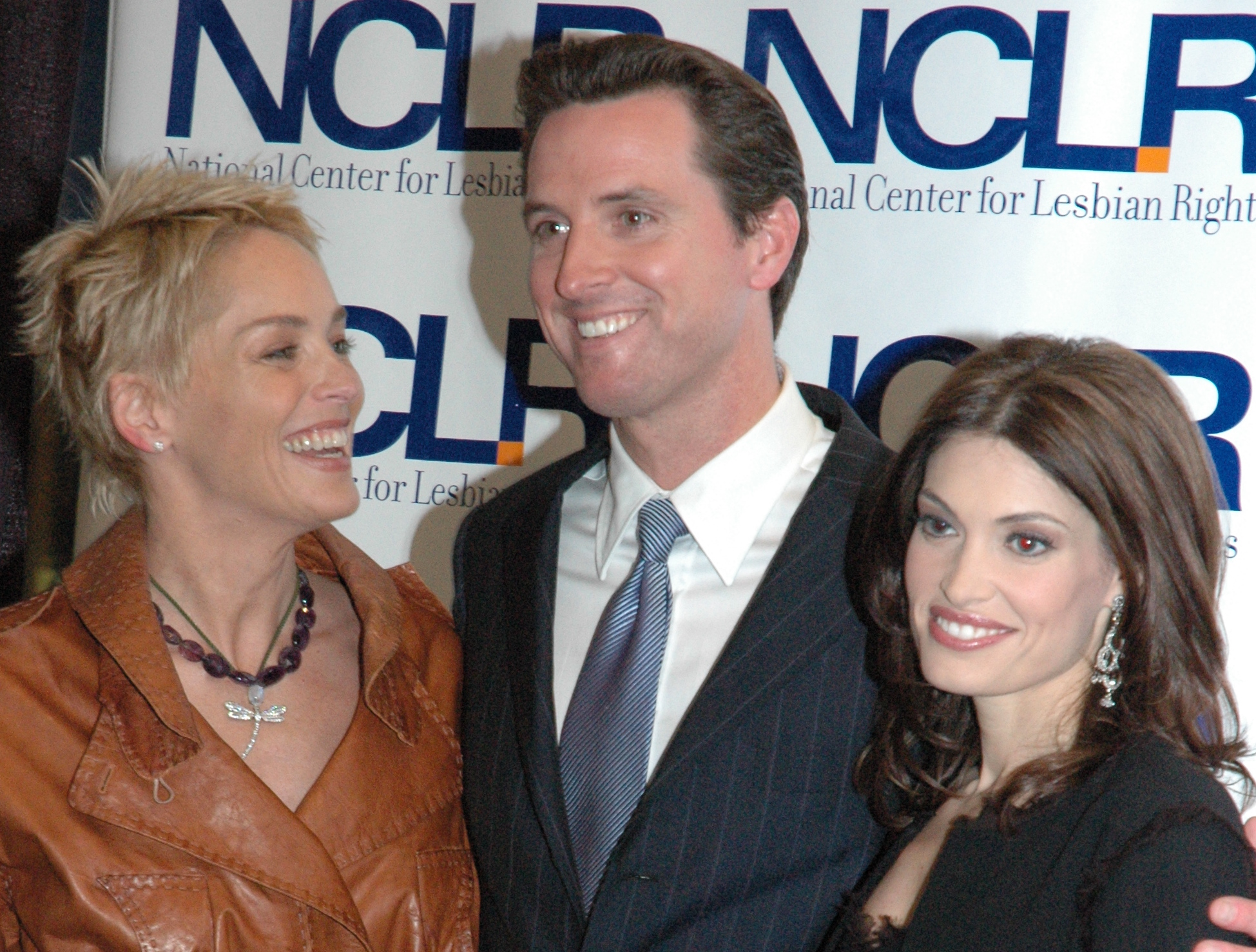
Guilfoyle (right) and her then-husband Gavin Newsom pose with actress Sharon Stone at a 2004 National Center for Lesbian Rights event.

In January 2004, Guilfoyle moved to New York to host the program Both Sides on Court TV. In addition, she worked as a legal analyst on Anderson Cooper 360°. She joined Fox News in February 2006 as host of the weekend show The Lineup. This was eventually canceled. Guilfoyle remained a regular contributor for the network, and in 2011 was picked as co-host of The Five. She worked as a host on the show until 2018.

In 2014, Guilfoyle began hosting and then co-hosting Outnumbered for nearly 50 episodes, plus a few more appearances until June 2018. Guilfoyle also appeared weekly on the recurring segment "Is It Legal?" on The O'Reilly Factor until that show was canceled in 2017, and as a weekly Thursday guest on Brian Kilmeade's Kilmeade and Friends radio show. Guilfoyle guest-hosted Hannity, On the Record, Justice with Judge Jeanine, and Fox & Friends.

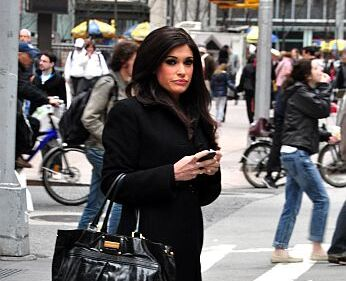
Guilfoyle in 2011

In mid-2017, Guilfoyle signed a long-term contract extension with Fox. In July 2018, she abruptly left Fox News and began working for a pro-Donald Trump super PAC. HuffPost reported that, at the time of her departure, the network had been in the midst of a year-long investigation of a sexual harassment accusation against Guilfoyle. Network officials had given Guilfoyle an ultimatum: resign by the end of July or be fired.

The New Yorker subsequently corroborated reports that Guilfoyle had been forced to resign rather than leaving by choice. After Guilfoyle left Fox News, the network agreed to an out-of-court settlement with an assistant who had accused Guilfoyle of sexual harassment. Terms were not disclosed. The New Yorker reported that the settlement was at least $4 million. Guilfoyle's former assistant alleged that Guilfoyle frequently displayed herself naked, showed photographs of the genitalia of men she had sex with, and required her to sleep over at Guilfoyle's apartment. The New Yorker independently verified several of the assistant's allegations. Guilfoyle denied any wrongdoing.

== Political career ==
=== Early political activities ===
In 1995, Guilfoyle worked on the reelection campaign of district attorney Arlo Smith. Around this time, she was also a regular fixture at political fundraisers organized by oil billionaire Gordon Getty, whose son William she dated. The timeline of Guilfoyle's relationship with Getty is not publicly known.

=== First Trump administration and 2020 re-election effort ===
In December 2016, it was reported that Guilfoyle was being considered for the position of press secretary for President-elect Donald Trump. Sean Spicer was considered the front-runner for the position, and was ultimately selected. On the May 12, 2017, edition of The Five, co-host Bob Beckel hinted that Guilfoyle turned the job down. In an interview with Bay Area News Group on May 15, Guilfoyle confirmed she was in contact with the White House about the position following Spicer's resignation. On May 19, 2017, Guilfoyle said she was under contract with Fox, indicating she turned the White House down. One month later, she extended her contract with Fox.

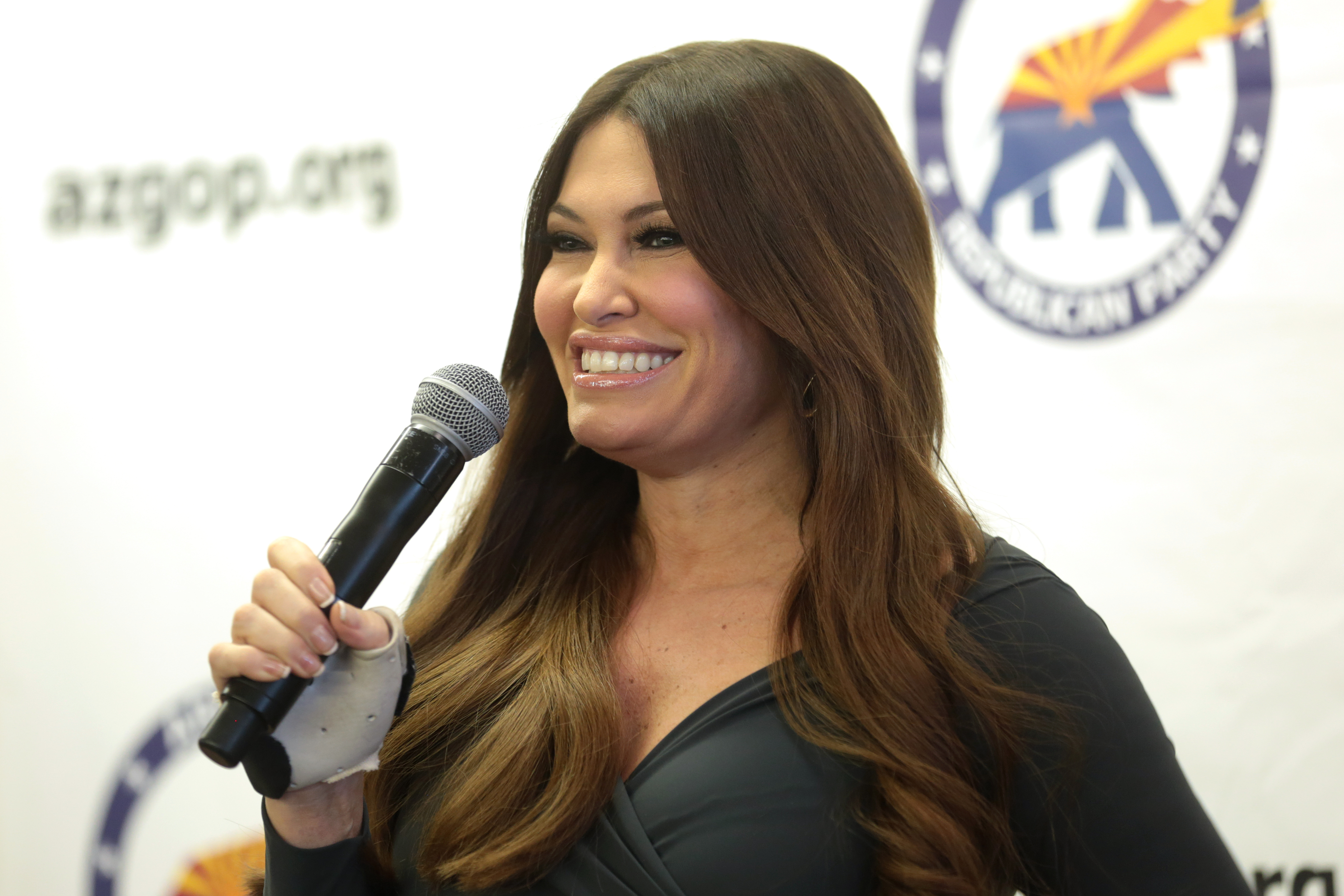
Guilfoyle speaking at a campaign rally in Sun City, Arizona, in November 2018

In 2018, The Washington Post called Guilfoyle a "conservative cheerleader for President Trump". In 2019, Guilfoyle and Donald Trump Jr. jointly toured school campuses, invited by venues such as the University of Florida, where they were paid $50,000 for their appearance from student activity fees, which led to complaints by anti-Trump students. At the event, two people were arrested and five were injured.

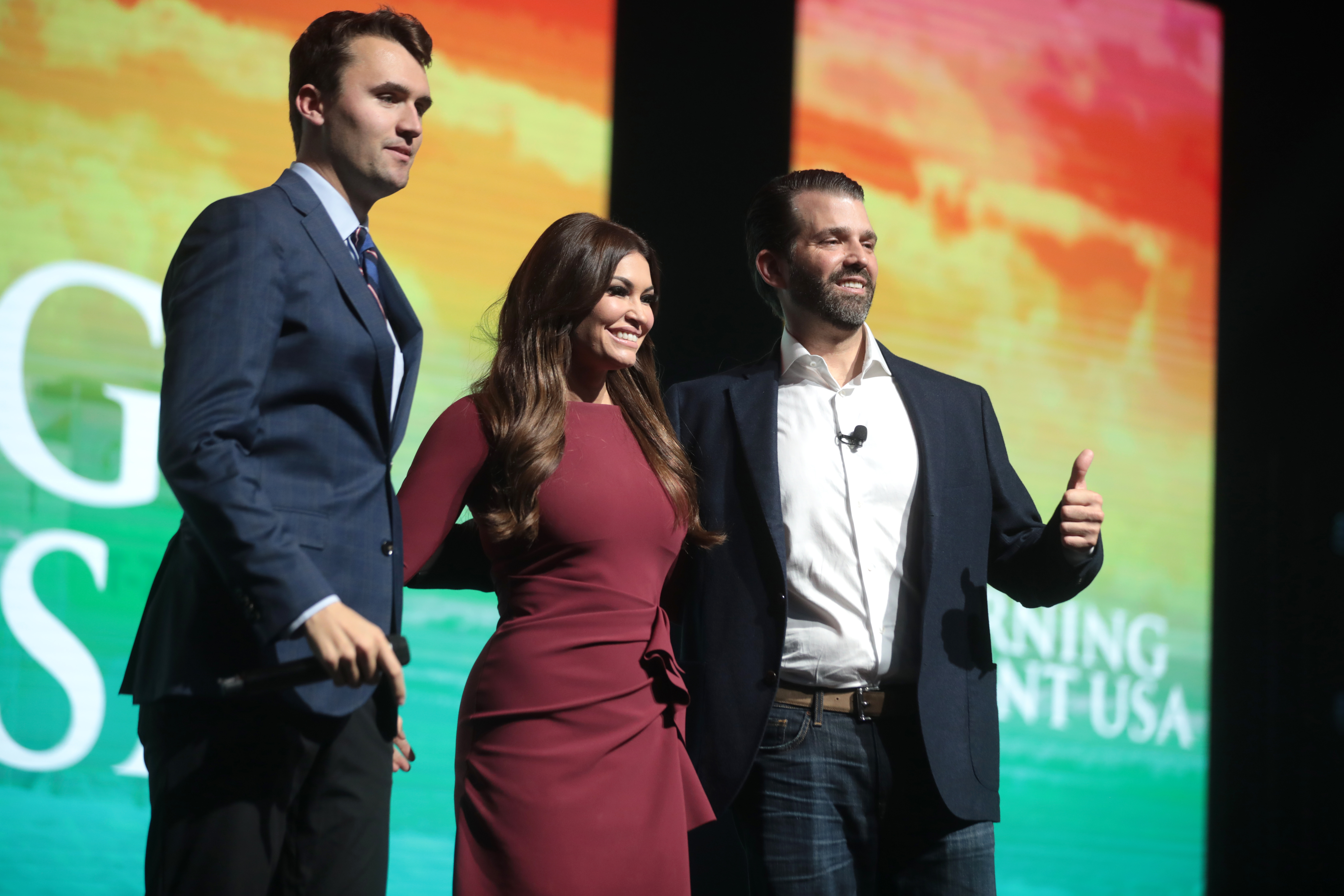
Guilfoyle with Charlie Kirk (left) and Donald Trump Jr. (right), pictured at the Palm Beach County Convention Center in 2019

In 2020, Guilfoyle was reported to be the chair of the finance committee of the Trump Victory Committee. As of early 2020, the Trump campaign was secretly paying Guilfoyle $15,000 per month through the campaign manager's private company, Parscale Strategy. Guilfoyle served as a surrogate on the stump and took on broad advisory roles. In the Trump 2020 campaign, she managed a fund-raising division. This division paid socialite Somers Farkas to raise money. The fundraising division Guilfoyle managed was in internal turmoil amid departures of experienced staff and accusations of irresponsible spending. In November 2020, Politico reported that Guilfoyle had engaged in sexually explicit conversations during private Trump fundraisers that had made some attendees uncomfortable. Politico reported that many campaign insiders alleged that this was part of severe human resources problems that plagued the fundraising division, likely damaging the Trump campaign's ability to keep pace with the Biden campaign's fundraising.

At the Republican National Convention in August 2020, Guilfoyle gave a speech endorsing Trump that was widely described as unnecessarily loud or unhinged. Others in media described it as passionate. She was criticized for describing herself as a first generation American when her mother was from Puerto Rico and thus a U.S. citizen. She is a first-generation American on her father's side, as he immigrated to the United States from Ireland.

On January 6, 2021, Guilfoyle joined Trump, Trump Jr., Rudy Giuliani, Eric Trump, and others on the Ellipse in Washington, D.C., to address the "Save America March." This resulted in the attack on the Capitol. Having raised millions of dollars to support the rally, Guilfoyle was also involved in organizing the protest at the Capitol. She was paid $60,000 for her rally speech, lasting less than three minutes. Guilfoyle was featured in a video screened at the rally by Trump Jr., "break[ing] into the hip-shaking dance she's been showcasing at other recent pro-Trump rallies" and "tell[ing] Trump fans: 'Have the courage to do the right thing! Fight!'"

=== Trump 2024 campaign ===
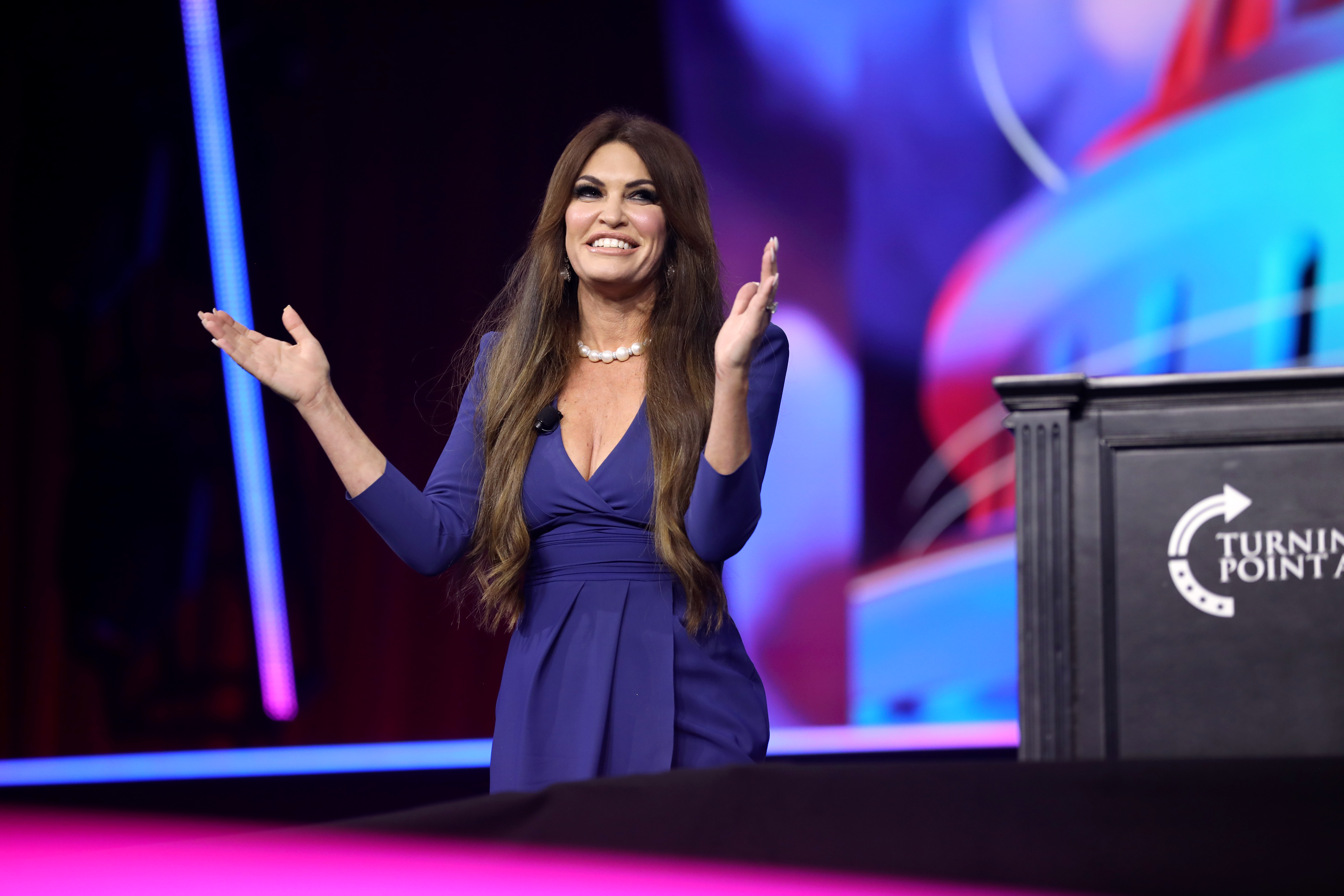
Guilfoyle at a June 2024 Turning Point USA event

Guilfoyle served on the platform committee of the 2024 Republican National Convention. She gave a speech at the convention. While the speech was delivered in a similar fashion to her derided 2020 convention speech, in 2024 convention her remarks were accompanied by positive responses from an in-person audience.

=== United States ambassador to Greece (2025–2026) ===
On December 10, 2024, President-elect Donald Trump announced his intent to nominate Guilfoyle as the next United States Ambassador to Greece. In July 2025, Guilfoyle testified before, and was approved by, the United States Senate Committee on Foreign Relations. On September 18, 2025, the Senate confirmed her nomination with a 51–47 vote, along with 47 other nominees, via a newly-adopted group process.

On September 29, 2025, Guilfoyle was sworn in and became the first female Ambassador of the United States to Greece. She arrived in Greece on November 1, 2025, and she presented her credentials to the President of Greece, Konstantinos Tasoulas, on November 4, 2025. In Greece she advocated for investments by American oil and gas companies in the region. According to The Wall Street Journal and other newspapers, she was exerting strong pressure on these countries to purchase more U.S. liquefied natural gas (LNG), claiming that the United States had the power to overthrow governments that refused to accept its terms. According to the Wall Street Journal, Guilfoyle allegedly said at a dinner in Athens in March 2026 that the United States had been involved in the fall of the Bolojan government of Romania, adding that the United States could do the same to any country; Guilfoyle's lawyer disputed the account, while the Financial Times independently corroborated the story. The Wall Street Journal reporting also indicated that Greek American businessman Christos Marafatsos has been serving as Guilfoyle's "unofficial gatekeeper", joining her for meetings with European officials and frequently present at her ambassadorial residence.

==== Allegations of corruption ====
On October 7, 2026, The Wall Street Journal reported that while preparing for her Senate confirmation hearings in 2025, Guilfoyle asked businessman and Trump-allied donor Eric Deters to send a wire transfer for $100,000 to pay down her American Express account "in a way that wouldn't leave a paper trail". Deters has run for political office several times, including a primary challenge against Thomas Massie, the Republican incumbent in Kentucky's 4th congressional district in 2024. Deters himself said this monetary request "absolutely was a quid pro quo", and referred to Guilfoyle as a "grifter". He said she was "desperate for me to send that $100,000" and that Guilfoyle promised to be his "ride or die in the Trump world" if the requested funds were sent. Deters reportedly declined to provide the money, saying he would get in trouble with his wife. In the messages, Guilfoyle admonished Deters for discussing the payments via text messages, writing: "Eric, I really wish you would stop papering all these things. It's really dangerous and not helpful to you or me while you could simply just call me on signal [sic]."

Originally reported by The Wall Street Journal, additional allegations include providing Christos Marafatsos, a Greek corporate energy lobbyist, access to official government meetings. She is also accused of bragging about getting luxury travel funded by Greek corporate executives.

Democrats from the House Oversight Committee requested that Guilfoyle provide them with financial records related to the Deters allegations. Days later, a person familiar with the matter told CNN that Trump was considering firing Guilfoyle over the misconduct. He was reportedly unhappy with allies profiting from their close relationships with him. On October 13, 2026, the White House Press Secretary Katie Zacharia announced that Trump asked Guilfoyle to resign. On the same day, Guilfoyle resigned her position as ambassador, and said that she would "vigorously defend" herself against the allegations.

== Writing ==
In 2015, HarperCollins published Guilfoyle's semi-autobiographical advice book Making the Case: How to Be Your Own Best Advocate, which was based on her experiences growing up and working as a prosecutor. In April 2024, Guilfoyle announced the upcoming publication of The Princess and her Pup, a children's book she wrote.

== Personal life ==
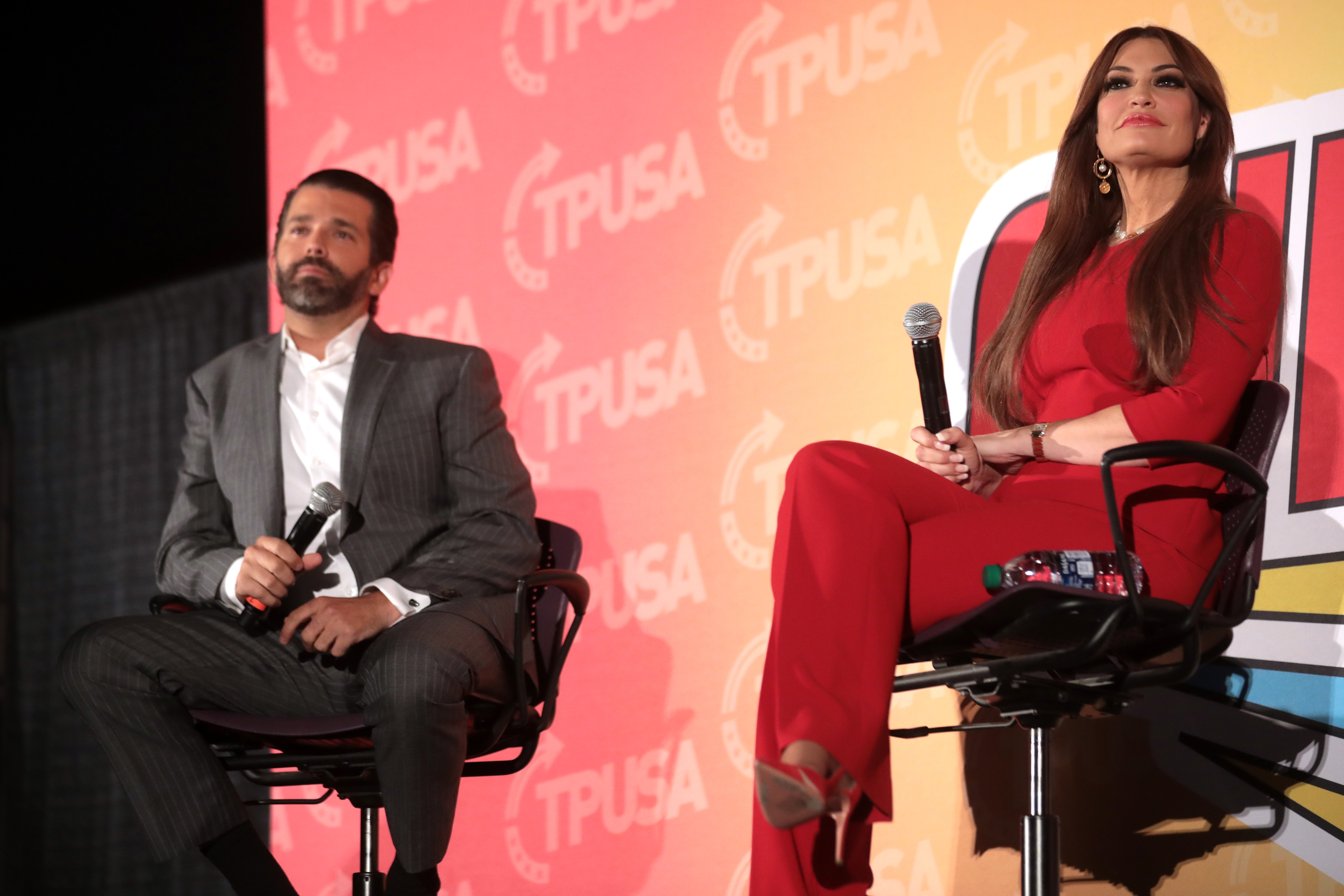
Guilfoyle with Donald Trump Jr. in October 2019

In December 2001, Guilfoyle married Gavin Newsom, then a San Francisco county supervisor. They separated in 2004, and in January 2005, citing the strain of a bicoastal marriage, jointly filed for divorce. Their divorce was finalized on February 28, 2006, by which time Guilfoyle was expecting a child with Eric Villency, the president and chief executive of Maurice Villency, a furniture chain. On May 27, 2006, in Barbados, Guilfoyle married Villency. Four months later, on October 4, 2006, she gave birth to their son Ronan. Guilfoyle and Villency divorced in November 2009.

In June 2018, Vanessa Trump, who had filed for divorce from Donald Trump Jr. three months earlier, confirmed that Guilfoyle was dating Trump Jr. In mid-2019, Guilfoyle and Trump jointly purchased a home in The Hamptons, priced at $4.4 million. They sold it in March 2021 during the COVID-19 pandemic for $8.14 million. Also in March 2021, the couple jointly purchased a $9.7 million home in Jupiter, Florida.

Guilfoyle and Trump became engaged on December 31, 2020. The engagement was not made public until January 2022. Guilfoyle and Trump Jr. cohabited in their Jupiter residence from 2021 until it was put up for sale in 2025. After news reports of Trump Jr. dating Palm Beach socialite and model Bettina Anderson became public in late 2024, the media reported that Guilfoyle and Trump had mutually ended their romantic relationship months earlier.

Many commentators have associated Guilfoyle with a style of plastic surgery and cosmetics popular among figures associated with the Trump administration, popularly dubbed Mar-a-Lago face.

== See also ==
- List of Fox News contributors
- Puerto Ricans in New York City
- List of U.S. Ambassadors to Greece

== Notes ==
Honorary titles
Preceded by Blanche Vitero	First Lady of San Francisco; 2004–2006	Vacant Title next held by Jennifer Siebel Newsom
Diplomatic posts
Preceded by George James Tsunis	United States Ambassador to Greece; 2025–2026	Succeeded by Josh Huck; Chargé d'affaires
