= 1952 United States presidential election in Michigan =

- November 4, 1952

All 20 Michigan votes to the Electoral College
- Turnout: 66.7% ▲

Nominee	Dwight D. Eisenhower	Adlai Stevenson
Party	Republican	Democratic
Home state	New York	Illinois
Running mate	Richard Nixon	John Sparkman
Electoral vote	20	0
Popular vote	1,551,529	1,230,657
Percentage	55.44%	43.97%
County results
Eisenhower
40–50%
50–60%
60–70%
70–80%
80–90%
Stevenson
40–50%
50–60%
President before election
Harry S. Truman
Democratic
Elected President
Dwight D. Eisenhower
Republican

The 1952 United States presidential election in Michigan took place on November 4, 1952, as part of the 1952 United States presidential election. Voters chose 20 representatives, or electors, to the Electoral College, who voted for president and vice president.

Michigan was won by Columbia University President Dwight D. Eisenhower (Republican–New York), running with Senator Richard Nixon, with 55.44% of the popular vote, against Illinois Governor Adlai Stevenson (Democratic), running with Alabama Senator John Sparkman, with 43.97% of the popular vote, making Michigan 0.6% more Republican than the nation-at-large. Eisenhower became the first ever Republican to win the White House without carrying Gogebic or Iron Counties, as well as the first to do so without carrying Wayne County since Benjamin Harrison in 1888.

== Results ==
1952 United States presidential election in Michigan
Party	Candidate	Votes	%
Republican	Dwight D. Eisenhower	1,551,529	55.44%
Democratic	Adlai Stevenson	1,230,657	43.97%
Prohibition	Stuart Hamblen	10,331	0.37%
Progressive	Vincent Hallinan	3,922	0.14%
Socialist Labor	Eric Hass	1,495	0.05%
Socialist Workers	Farrell Dobbs	655	0.02%
Write-in	Scattering	3	0.00%
Total votes		2,798,592	100.00%

=== Results by county ===
County	Dwight D. Eisenhower Republican		Adlai Stevenson Democratic		Stuart Hamblen Prohibition		Vincent Hallinan Progressive		All Others Various		Margin		Total votes cast
County	#	%	#	%	#	%	#	%	#	%	#	%	Total votes cast
Alcona	1,441	65.06%	766	34.58%	8	0.36%	0	0.00%	0	0.00%	675	30.48%	2,215
Alger	2,066	49.68%	2,058	49.48%	15	0.36%	18	0.43%	2	0.05%	8	0.20%	4,159
Allegan	15,663	73.40%	5,437	25.48%	214	1.00%	13	0.06%	11	0.05%	10,226	47.92%	21,338
Alpena	6,248	66.32%	3,134	33.27%	32	0.34%	2	0.02%	5	0.05%	3,114	33.05%	9,421
Antrim	3,533	76.50%	1,046	22.65%	38	0.82%	1	0.02%	0	0.00%	2,487	53.85%	4,618
Arenac	2,753	67.74%	1,290	31.74%	10	0.25%	10	0.25%	1	0.02%	1,463	36.00%	4,064
Baraga	2,103	57.29%	1,540	41.95%	4	0.11%	23	0.63%	1	0.03%	563	15.34%	3,671
Barry	8,933	72.70%	3,230	26.29%	116	0.94%	5	0.04%	3	0.02%	5,703	46.41%	12,287
Bay	20,087	58.40%	14,113	41.03%	173	0.50%	11	0.03%	12	0.03%	5,974	17.37%	34,396
Benzie	2,752	73.04%	980	26.01%	30	0.80%	4	0.11%	2	0.05%	1,772	47.03%	3,768
Berrien	32,932	62.94%	19,088	36.48%	212	0.41%	66	0.13%	22	0.04%	13,844	26.46%	52,320
Branch	9,215	71.52%	3,564	27.66%	94	0.73%	5	0.04%	6	0.05%	5,651	43.86%	12,884
Calhoun	31,941	62.09%	19,171	37.26%	286	0.56%	26	0.05%	23	0.04%	12,770	24.83%	51,447
Cass	8,479	64.86%	4,500	34.42%	71	0.54%	13	0.10%	9	0.07%	3,979	30.44%	13,072
Charlevoix	3,895	68.07%	1,778	31.07%	42	0.73%	4	0.07%	3	0.05%	2,117	37.00%	5,722
Cheboygan	4,385	69.50%	1,900	30.12%	13	0.21%	5	0.08%	6	0.10%	2,485	39.38%	6,309
Chippewa	7,075	62.12%	4,257	37.38%	34	0.30%	20	0.18%	3	0.03%	2,818	24.74%	11,389
Clare	3,529	76.22%	1,059	22.87%	32	0.69%	4	0.09%	6	0.13%	2,470	53.35%	4,630
Clinton	10,510	77.47%	2,977	21.94%	75	0.55%	3	0.02%	1	0.01%	7,533	55.53%	13,566
Crawford	1,331	72.53%	490	26.70%	12	0.65%	2	0.11%	0	0.00%	841	45.83%	1,835
Delta	7,488	51.79%	6,921	47.87%	17	0.12%	23	0.16%	9	0.06%	567	3.92%	14,458
Dickinson	6,045	51.18%	5,710	48.34%	33	0.28%	14	0.12%	9	0.08%	335	2.84%	11,811
Eaton	13,723	72.42%	5,170	27.28%	33	0.17%	14	0.07%	9	0.05%	8,553	45.14%	18,949
Emmet	5,113	72.90%	1,871	26.68%	26	0.37%	2	0.03%	2	0.03%	3,242	46.22%	7,014
Genesee	62,220	51.97%	56,753	47.41%	544	0.45%	137	0.11%	58	0.05%	5,467	4.56%	119,712
Gladwin	3,031	75.85%	936	23.42%	23	0.58%	5	0.13%	1	0.03%	2,095	52.43%	3,996
Gogebic	6,195	47.47%	6,803	52.13%	12	0.09%	34	0.26%	7	0.05%	-608	-4.66%	13,051
Grand Traverse	9,034	77.14%	2,639	22.53%	28	0.24%	6	0.05%	4	0.03%	6,395	54.61%	11,711
Gratiot	10,034	77.06%	2,887	22.17%	92	0.71%	7	0.05%	1	0.01%	7,147	54.89%	13,021
Hillsdale	10,680	75.51%	3,340	23.62%	118	0.83%	5	0.04%	0	0.00%	7,340	51.89%	14,143
Houghton	10,563	59.57%	7,100	40.04%	28	0.16%	36	0.20%	6	0.03%	3,463	19.53%	17,733
Huron	10,639	81.28%	2,421	18.50%	26	0.20%	2	0.02%	1	0.01%	8,218	62.78%	13,089
Ingham	51,503	67.62%	24,125	31.68%	403	0.53%	75	0.10%	55	0.07%	27,378	35.94%	76,161
Ionia	10,970	69.35%	4,722	29.85%	121	0.76%	4	0.03%	2	0.01%	6,248	39.50%	15,819
Iosco	3,772	74.56%	1,274	25.18%	6	0.12%	3	0.06%	4	0.08%	2,498	49.38%	5,059
Iron	4,564	49.52%	4,597	49.88%	33	0.36%	19	0.21%	3	0.03%	-33	-0.36%	9,216
Isabella	8,222	73.54%	2,881	25.77%	71	0.64%	5	0.04%	1	0.01%	5,341	47.77%	11,180
Jackson	32,810	68.20%	15,065	31.32%	192	0.40%	18	0.04%	20	0.04%	17,745	36.88%	48,105
Kalamazoo	38,847	66.76%	18,967	32.60%	310	0.53%	42	0.07%	19	0.03%	19,880	34.16%	58,185
Kalkaska	1,326	72.74%	483	26.49%	10	0.55%	4	0.22%	0	0.00%	843	46.25%	1,823
Kent	79,467	62.02%	47,221	36.85%	1,259	0.98%	126	0.10%	62	0.05%	32,246	25.17%	128,135
Keweenaw	801	51.38%	747	47.92%	2	0.13%	9	0.58%	0	0.00%	54	3.46%	1,559
Lake	1,549	57.46%	1,127	41.80%	9	0.33%	10	0.37%	1	0.04%	422	15.66%	2,696
Lapeer	9,940	72.79%	3,644	26.68%	55	0.40%	7	0.05%	10	0.07%	6,296	46.11%	13,656
Leelanau	2,926	74.38%	999	25.39%	7	0.18%	1	0.03%	1	0.03%	1,927	48.99%	3,934
Lenawee	20,035	72.72%	7,397	26.85%	107	0.39%	5	0.02%	5	0.02%	12,638	45.87%	27,549
Livingston	9,790	75.57%	3,086	23.82%	67	0.52%	8	0.06%	4	0.03%	6,704	51.75%	12,955
Luce	1,603	74.25%	553	25.61%	2	0.09%	1	0.05%	0	0.00%	1,050	48.64%	2,159
Mackinac	3,058	70.23%	1,285	29.51%	10	0.23%	1	0.02%	0	0.00%	1,773	40.72%	4,354
Macomb	37,474	50.39%	36,544	49.14%	191	0.26%	67	0.09%	88	0.12%	930	1.25%	74,364
Manistee	5,235	62.50%	3,114	37.18%	18	0.21%	6	0.07%	3	0.04%	2,121	25.32%	8,376
Marquette	11,618	53.65%	9,949	45.94%	41	0.19%	40	0.18%	7	0.03%	1,669	7.71%	21,655
Mason	6,179	64.65%	3,298	34.51%	43	0.45%	30	0.31%	8	0.08%	2,881	30.14%	9,558
Mecosta	5,436	76.54%	1,587	22.35%	77	1.08%	2	0.03%	0	0.00%	3,849	54.19%	7,102
Menominee	6,147	55.54%	4,884	44.13%	27	0.24%	3	0.03%	7	0.06%	1,263	11.41%	11,068
Midland	10,508	72.12%	3,945	27.08%	101	0.69%	8	0.05%	8	0.05%	6,563	45.04%	14,570
Missaukee	2,525	80.01%	600	19.01%	31	0.98%	0	0.00%	0	0.00%	1,925	61.00%	3,156
Monroe	17,159	57.06%	12,758	42.42%	113	0.38%	22	0.07%	22	0.07%	4,401	14.64%	30,074
Montcalm	9,946	71.42%	3,844	27.60%	117	0.84%	11	0.08%	8	0.06%	6,102	43.82%	13,926
Montmorency	1,449	71.91%	544	27.00%	17	0.84%	4	0.20%	1	0.05%	905	44.91%	2,015
Muskegon	25,967	51.47%	23,826	47.23%	481	0.95%	63	0.12%	109	0.22%	2,141	4.24%	50,446
Newaygo	6,715	71.81%	2,541	27.17%	85	0.91%	8	0.09%	2	0.02%	4,174	44.64%	9,351
Oakland	115,503	60.73%	73,871	38.84%	522	0.27%	155	0.08%	128	0.07%	41,632	21.89%	190,179
Oceana	4,704	71.04%	1,799	27.17%	106	1.60%	10	0.15%	3	0.05%	2,905	43.87%	6,622
Ogemaw	2,983	73.91%	1,030	25.52%	16	0.40%	5	0.12%	2	0.05%	1,953	48.39%	4,036
Ontonagon	2,961	57.39%	2,134	41.36%	7	0.14%	52	1.01%	5	0.10%	827	16.03%	5,159
Osceola	4,607	78.86%	1,160	19.86%	73	1.25%	1	0.02%	1	0.02%	3,447	59.00%	5,842
Oscoda	1,047	80.72%	246	18.97%	3	0.23%	1	0.08%	0	0.00%	801	61.75%	1,297
Otsego	1,941	68.88%	865	30.70%	7	0.25%	3	0.11%	2	0.07%	1,076	38.18%	2,818
Ottawa	22,328	72.83%	7,835	25.56%	454	1.48%	21	0.07%	19	0.06%	14,493	47.27%	30,657
Presque Isle	2,982	61.84%	1,825	37.85%	15	0.31%	0	0.00%	0	0.00%	1,157	23.99%	4,822
Roscommon	2,547	78.64%	676	20.87%	11	0.34%	1	0.03%	4	0.12%	1,871	57.77%	3,239
Saginaw	38,604	64.23%	20,983	34.91%	435	0.72%	34	0.06%	44	0.07%	17,621	29.32%	60,100
Sanilac	11,181	82.47%	2,298	16.95%	66	0.49%	6	0.04%	6	0.04%	8,883	65.52%	13,557
Schoolcraft	2,352	58.05%	1,692	41.76%	8	0.20%	0	0.00%	0	0.00%	660	16.29%	4,052
Shiawassee	13,562	68.41%	6,056	30.55%	184	0.93%	13	0.07%	9	0.05%	7,506	37.86%	19,824
St. Clair	27,894	69.29%	12,268	30.47%	57	0.14%	29	0.07%	8	0.02%	15,626	38.82%	40,256
St. Joseph	12,191	72.19%	4,509	26.70%	175	1.04%	5	0.03%	7	0.04%	7,682	45.49%	16,887
Tuscola	11,788	77.97%	3,251	21.50%	69	0.46%	7	0.05%	4	0.03%	8,537	56.47%	15,119
Van Buren	13,231	70.91%	5,309	28.45%	70	0.38%	36	0.19%	13	0.07%	7,922	42.46%	18,659
Washtenaw	35,826	66.64%	17,671	32.87%	140	0.26%	88	0.16%	34	0.06%	18,155	33.77%	53,759
Wayne	456,371	42.12%	622,236	57.43%	1,242	0.11%	2,347	0.22%	1,185	0.11%	-165,865	-15.31%	1,083,381
Wexford	5,569	68.98%	2,407	29.82%	91	1.13%	6	0.07%	0	0.00%	3,162	39.16%	8,073
Totals	1,551,529	55.44%	1,230,657	43.97%	10,331	0.37%	3,922	0.14%	2,153	0.07%	320,872	11.47%	2,798,592

==== Counties that flipped from Democratic to Republican ====
- Alger
- Bay
- Delta
- Dickinson
- Genesee
- Macomb
- Marquette
- Menominee
- Muskegon

== See also ==
- United States presidential elections in Michigan
