= Eric Villency =

American chief executive officer (born 1975)

- Born: Eric Scot Villency; June 10, 1975 (age 51); New York City, U.S.
- Occupations: Interior designer, businessman
- Known for: CEO of Villency Design Group
- Spouses: Kimberly Guilfoyle (m. 2006; div. 2009) Caroline Fare (m. 2013; div. 2017)
- Children: 1

Eric Scot Villency (born June 10, 1975) is an American businessman. He is the CEO of Villency Design Group, an interior and product design firm.

== Career ==
=== Design ===
In 1932, Villency's grandfather, Maurice Villency, started a furniture company in New York City. His grandfather's company became the Villency Design Group, and in 1998, Eric Villency became CEO.

Villency was named "The Wizard of Wellness" by Well + Good in 2003, and Inc. Magazine named him of the most influential designers to watch in 2016. In 2001, he was awarded the FIT "All Star Salute" award, recognizing leaders in design and fashion. In 2002, Villency oversaw the launch of the Maurice Villency flagship store, located on 57th Street in midtown Manhattan, and launched the company's first home accessories collection. In 2006, he launched Villency Atelier, a workshop dedicated to custom design and fabrication for design professionals.

In 2008, Villency launched his business initiative, Villency Pure Design, a furniture company. He has lectured at Savannah College of Art and Design.

Villency has worked in boutique fitness having designed the Peloton indoor bike, the SoulCycle indoor fitness bike, along with fitness equipment for Rumble.

=== Writing ===
Villency is a contributing writer for the Huffington Post. He has written for The New York Times, Details, Best Life, Women's Health, and Departures.

== Personal life ==
Villency is the son of Rowann, a mixed media artist, and Robert Villency, the chairman of Maurice Villency. Villency graduated from the University of Wisconsin.

On May 27, 2006, on the island of Barbados, he married Kimberly Guilfoyle, a Fox News personality who was once a prosecutor in San Francisco. On October 4, 2006, Guilfoyle gave birth to their son, Ronan Anthony. They divorced in November 2009.

In December 2013, he married Swedish designer Caroline Fare in West Palm Beach. Villency and Fare divorced in 2017.
