= Terence Hallinan =

American lawyer and politician (1936–2020)

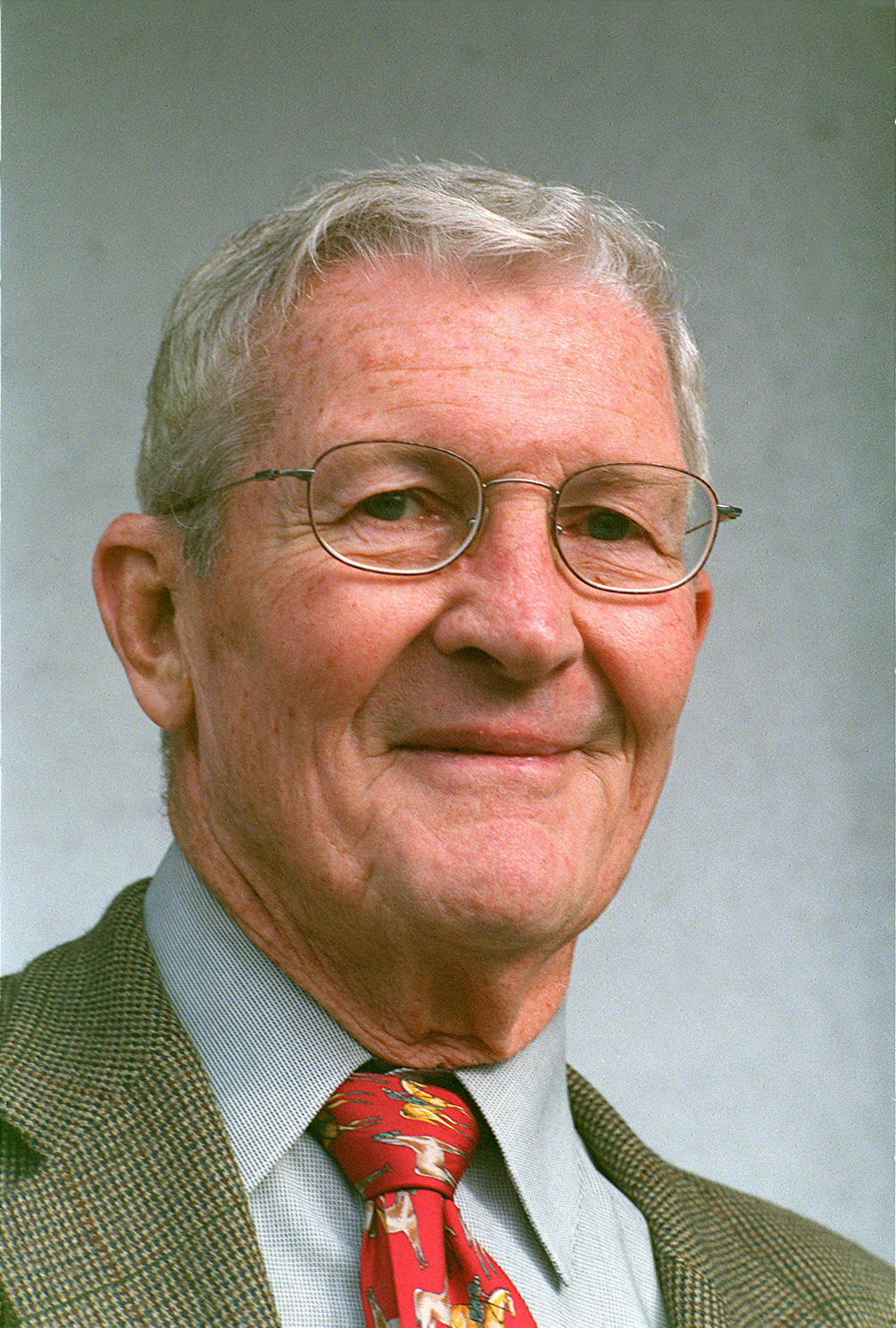
- Hallinan in 2003

26th District Attorney of San Francisco
- In office January 8, 1996 – January 8, 2004
- Preceded by: Arlo Smith
- Succeeded by: Kamala Harris

Member of the San Francisco Board of Supervisors for the at-large district
- In office January 8, 1989 – January 8, 1996
- Preceded by: Carol Ruth Silver
- Succeeded by: Michael Yaki

Personal details
- Born: December 4, 1936 San Francisco, California, U.S.
- Died: January 17, 2020 (aged 83) San Francisco, California, U.S.
- Party: Democratic
- Parent: Vincent Hallinan (father)
- Education: University of California, Berkeley; London School of Economics; UC Hastings College of the Law
- Profession: Attorney, politician

Terence Hallinan (December 4, 1936 – January 17, 2020) was an American attorney and politician from San Francisco, California. He was the second of six sons born to Progressive Party presidential candidate Vincent Hallinan and his wife, Vivian (Moore) Hallinan. Hallinan was educated at the London School of Economics, University of California, Berkeley, and University of California, Hastings College of the Law. He practiced privately in San Francisco.

== Early life ==
Hallinan grew up in a 22-room mansion in Ross, California. At age twelve, he fell off his horse, fractured his skull, and spent five days stranded outside Yosemite before being rescued by helicopter.

As a young man Hallinan developed, in the words of California Supreme Court Justice Raymond E. Peters, a "habitual and continuing resort to fisticuffs to settle personal differences." He became a ward of juvenile court in 1954 when he took a case of beer from three sailors after he and his brother had run them off the road on Point Reyes and beat them. The juvenile court banned him from Marin County so he got a job in a warehouse in Sacramento before clerking for the Longshoremen's Union in Hawaii. Shortly after turning eighteen, he pleaded guilty to battery for punching the proprietor of the Edelweiss Ski Lodge.

In 1957, he punched a fraternity brother who denied him admission to a private party. He was indicted in 1959 after he broke a man's jaw during a brawl at a Greenbrae bowling alley. While at UC Berkeley, he boxed for the Golden Bears and sparred with Muhammad Ali in the 1960 Olympic boxing team eliminations.

Hallinan's propensity for fistfights continued in law school. When he and his brother were picketing in San Francisco against the House Un-American Activities Committee, some of their classmates arrived to picket them. Strong words ensued and a fight was arranged in Golden Gate Park. Initially Hallinan was part of the crowd of UC Hastings student onlookers but he soon began a brawl with one of the opposing spectators. He also engaged in fistfights at a Young Democrats meeting and over a woman while at UC Hastings.

As a student, Hallinan also became interested in nonviolent resistance. While attending the London School of Economics, he was arrested with Lord Bertrand Russell during a Campaign for Nuclear Disarmament sit-down demonstration in front of the U.S. embassy. When he returned to America, he joined the Student Non-Violent Coordinating Committee and spent the summer of 1963 in Mississippi. Local authorities jailed Hallinan twice but the U.S. Attorney General and the National Council of Churches intervened to secure his release.

Back in San Francisco, Hallinan helped organize the W.E.B. DuBois Club to support Communist Party USA. In the fall of 1963, he joined the Ad Hoc Committee to End Discrimination and participated in sit-ins at the Sheraton Palace Hotel, Mel's Drive-In, and the Van Ness Avenue Cadillac showroom. His civil disobedience in the city resulted in six arrests and two separate criminal convictions.

== Legal practice ==
After graduating from UC Hastings, Hallinan's criminal history proved an obstacle to his admission to the California State Bar. The Committee of Bar Examiners required several hearings over Hallinan's moral character. Hallinan introduced evidence that his violent tendencies were the result of a thyroid deficiency. His mother, however, testified that Hallinan became violent in response to the bullying caused by his father's vocal support of labor leaders during the Red Scare. California State Assemblymen Willie Brown and John L. Burton both testified that Hallinan possessed good moral character. The Committee questioned Hallinan about whether civil disobedience is compatible with being an attorney at law. Hallinan responded that he thought "it's an unfortunate thing" that more German lawyers did not disobey the Third Reich.

The California State Bar refused to admit Hallinan. Hallinan appealed to the Supreme Court of California, and won. Justice Peters found that if the court denied professional licenses to everyone who engaged in a sit-in "we would deprive the community of the services of many highly qualified persons of the highest moral courage." Justice Marshall F. McComb dissented, writing that Hallinan believes he has a "right to violate the law".

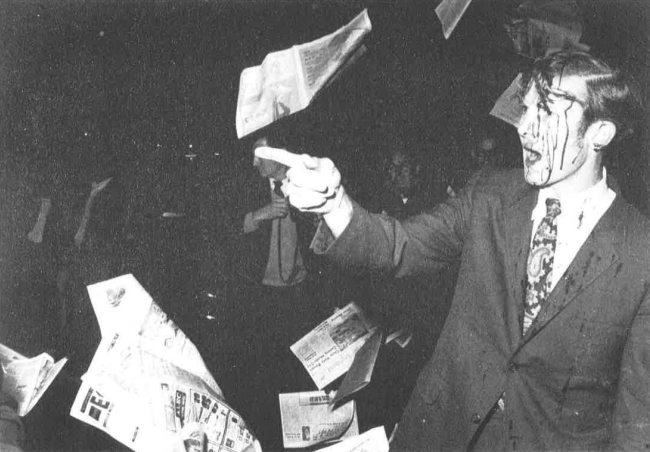
NLG attorney Terence Hallinan, beaten by police at the site of the Presidio Mutiny, October 1968.

Beginning his career during the peak of the counterculture in the 1960s Hallinan defended hundreds of drug charges out of the Haight-Ashbury. Janis Joplin's biographer alleges that Hallinan almost died after the singer shot him up with heroin at her Noe Street apartment.

In 1967, Hallinan unsuccessfully represented Church of Satan founder Anton LaVey in a misdemeanor "disturbing the peace" case regarding LaVey's pet lion being kept in LaVey's home in a residential neighborhood. Hallinan successfully defended the Diggers after they were arrested for giving away free food on the steps of San Francisco City Hall. In 1968 he unsuccessfully defended the mutiny court-martial of the Presidio 27.

As an attorney, he successfully argued to have the murder convictions of serial killer Juan Corona overturned on appeal, and represented Corona in his retrial which resulted in 25 convictions for murder and a life sentence.

Hallinan unsuccessfully defended William Leonard Pickard for running an LSD laboratory in Mountain View, California, and later used the DA office's official letterhead to personally recommend Pickard be bailed after being caught in the largest LSD bust in history.

In 1975 Hallinan quickly left the Patty Hearst defense team after they rejected his involuntary intoxication theory of the case. Two years later, he represented 16-year-old Marlene Olive, who was accused (along with her adult boyfriend) of murdering her parents in the "barbecue murders" case.

In 1988, Hallinan left private practice for a political career, first serving for seven years on the San Francisco Board of Supervisors and then as district attorney. In 2004, he returned to private practice, focusing primarily on medical marijuana cases. In 2010, he defended Mitchell Brothers porn empire heir James Mitchell, who was accused of murdering his infant daughter's mother with a baseball bat. Mitchell fired Hallinan after seven months, and was then convicted.

In late 2014, Hallinan was temporarily suspended by the State Bar of California for commingling his and a trust client's funds. On July 16, 2018, when he was 81 years old, Hallinan was suspended for failing to pass a professional responsibility exam and was henceforth not eligible to practice law.

== Political career ==
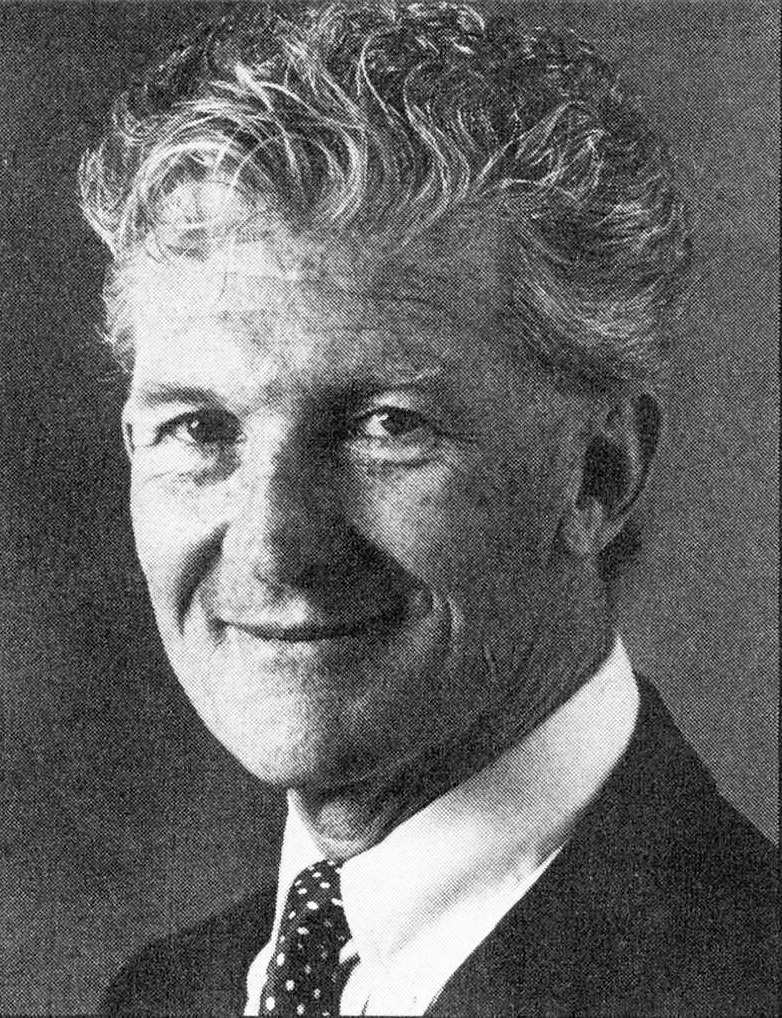
Hallinan in 1988 during his second run for San Francisco Board of Supervisors.

Hallinan lost his first election campaign, for San Francisco District 5 Supervisor, to Harvey Milk in the 1977 San Francisco Board of Supervisors election. Hallinan ran again in 1988 and this time won a seat on the board.

In the 1995 elections the police union and both the city's daily newspapers endorsed recently fired senior prosecutor Bill Fazio against incumbent district attorney (DA) Arlo Smith. Hallinan successfully forced and won a runoff election for DA through a campaign run by his longtime aide Ross Mirkarimi. The former defense attorney promptly fired 14 senior prosecutors, leaving pink slips on their chairs during lunch, then posted an armed guard outside his new office in the Hall of Justice. Prominent Irish real estate developer Joe O'Donoghue confronted Hallinan about the firings while attending a birthday party at Izzy's Steaks and Chops. Hallinan responded by punching him. The resulting scuffle was lampooned by David Letterman.

When two prosecutors were caught having sex in their office Hallinan fired the man but retained the woman. Hallinan's chief assistant Marla Miller resigned over the scandal so Hallinan replaced her with David Millstein, the private attorney who had represented him in the sexual harassment lawsuit he settled out of court while a city supervisor.

In 1999 Hallinan was investigated for felony misappropriation of funds for a salary he paid out to his cousin.

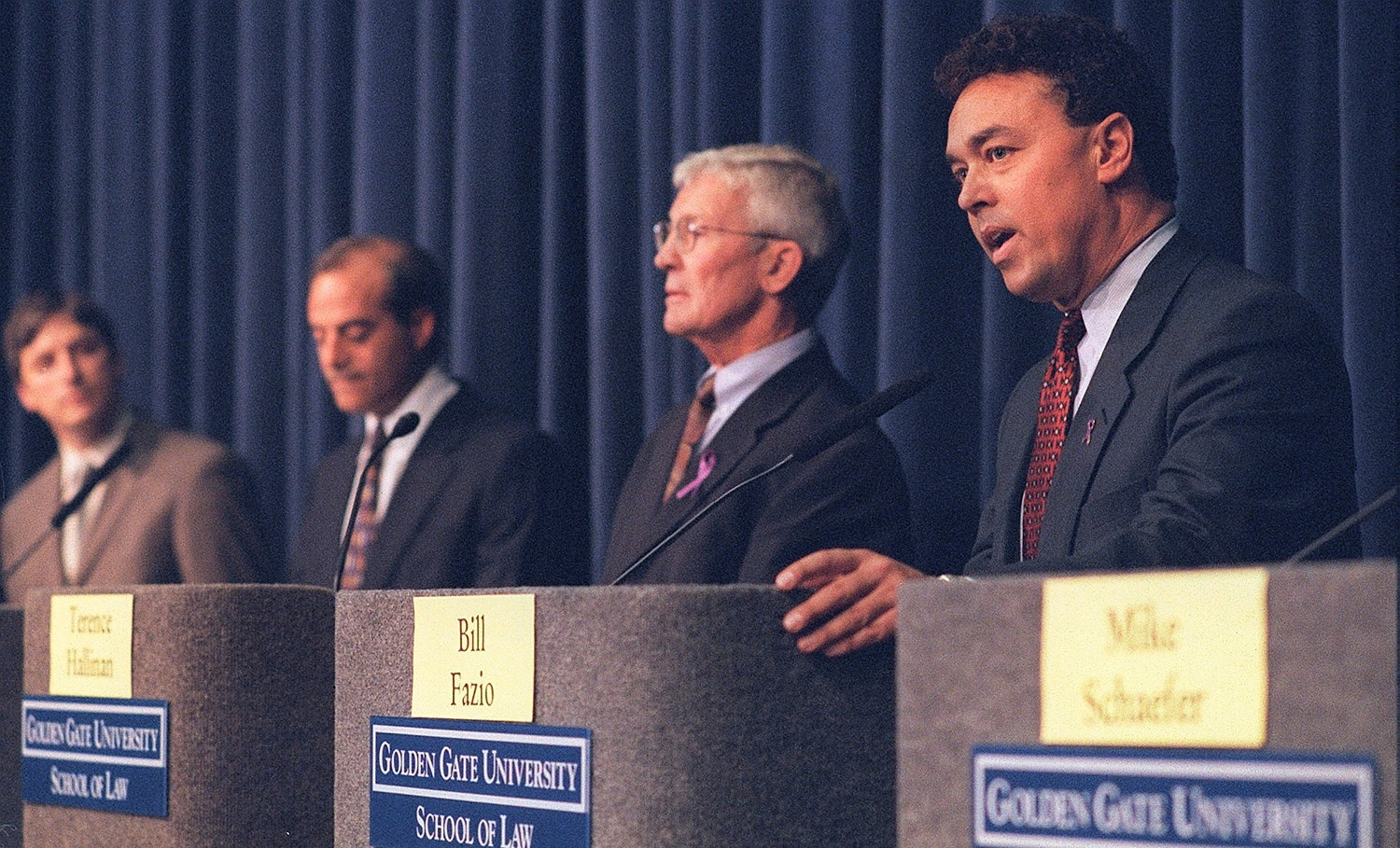
Terence Hallinan (second from right), Bill Fazio (far right) and Matt Gonzalez (far left) at the 1999 District Attorney debate in San Francisco

After a close-fought reelection campaign in 1999, Hallinan's office sank to the lowest case winning percentage of any DA's office in the state. While serving as DA, he became a notable opponent of capital punishment. He also was a strong advocate on behalf of decriminalizing prostitution. In his tenure he supported medical marijuana and was an advisor to NORML.

When Diane Whipple was mauled to death by a dog, Hallinan brought murder charges against its owners. After a nationally publicized trial that had to be moved to Los Angeles, Hallinan's prosecutors, former Jesuit priest Jim Hammer and Kimberly Guilfoyle Newsom, won the conviction.

The SFPD leadership was indicted by Hallinan after a bar fight involving assistant police chief Alex Fagan's son. The scandal became known as Fajitagate. Most charges were later dropped and the only two officers tried were acquitted. By indicting Chief Earl Sanders, the city's first black police chief who had helped win the lawsuit setting racial quotas on SFPD hiring, Hallinan was expected to lose crucial support from the city's black voters. Chief Sanders later sued Hallinan.

Hallinan was defeated in the next election for DA by Kamala Harris. When Harris took over in 2004, Hallinan returned to private practice with his son, focusing almost exclusively on medical marijuana cases.

Hallinan's death was announced on January 17, 2020, by San Francisco Mayor London Breed. He was 83. He was remembered by the San Francisco Chronicle as a "onetime teenage brawler who became a fighter for civil rights and then an against-the-grain politician, serving as a San Francisco supervisor and the city’s district attorney."
