= Michael Yaki =

American politician

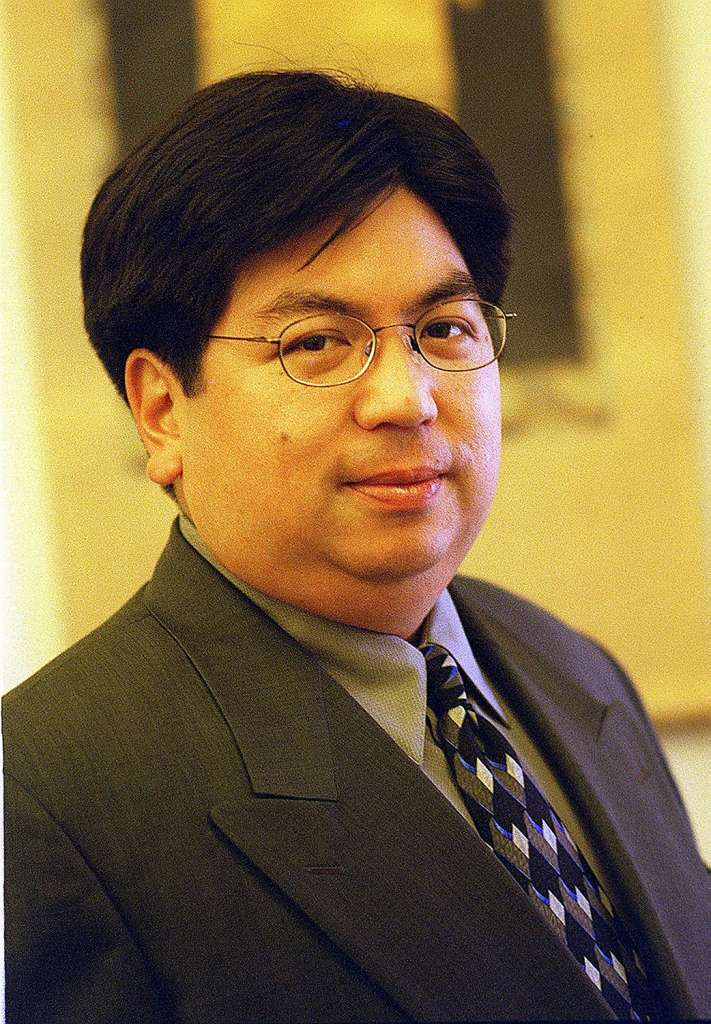
- Yaki c. 1996–2001

Commissioner on the United States Commission on Civil Rights
- In office February 15, 2005 – December 31, 2022
- Preceded by: Christopher Edley, Jr.
- Succeeded by: Mondaire Jones

Member of the San Francisco Board of Supervisors
- In office February 6, 1996 – January 8, 2001
- Preceded by: Terence Hallinan
- Succeeded by: Jake McGoldrick

Personal details
- Born: 1961 (age 64–65)
- Party: Democratic
- Education: University of California, Berkeley (BA); Yale University (JD)

Michael Yaki (born 1961) is an American attorney and politician who served as a Commissioner on the United States Commission on Civil Rights from 2005 to 2022. A member of the Democratic Party, he served as a member of the San Francisco Board of Supervisors from 1996 to 2001.

Yaki graduated from UC Berkeley, and then from Yale Law School. After a brief stint with the law firm of Morrison & Foerster, Yaki was appointed by Congresswoman Nancy Pelosi to be her district director and as a senior advisor. Yaki was also a former member of the San Francisco Board of Supervisors, serving from his appointment by then-mayor Willie Brown in February 1996. He ran for election and won in November 1996, and served until his election defeat in 2000.

== Early career and education ==
Born in Los Angeles, California, Yaki's father was a member of the United States Foreign Service and much of his youth was spent abroad. His family lived in the Philippines, Taiwan, Jakarta, Indonesia, and Ottawa, Canada. He graduated from high school in Virginia.

Yaki graduated from the University of California, Berkeley. At Berkeley, he was elected to student senate He then received his Juris Doctor degree from Yale Law School.

Upon graduation, Yaki clerked for the California Courts of Appeal, First District, for Justice Harry Low. After finishing his clerkship, he accepted a position as a law associate at the San Francisco office of Morrison and Foerster.

== Senior Advisor to Rep. Pelosi ==
Yaki was asked to by Congresswoman Nancy Pelosi to work for her as her district director. In that capacity, Yaki supervised her San Francisco office but also began advising her on the whole range of issues facing the Congresswoman. Yaki became her liaison to the City and County of San Francisco, but was also active in her policies regarding China, transportation, and the conversion of defense installations at the Presidio of San Francisco, the Hunters Point Naval Shipyard, and Treasure Island. During President Clinton's campaign in 1992, Pelosi was asked by the Democratic National Committee to be a co-chair of the Platform Committee. In that role, Yaki was her primary staffer, working closely with then-candidate Clinton's campaign in the drafting and passage of the Platform.

In 1995, Yaki was asked by Willie Brown, the Speaker of the California State Assembly to help him with his run for mayor. After Brown won, speculation ensued as to whether Yaki would join the new Administration and in what position. In Brown's first news conference, he announced that he was appointing Yaki to fill the unexpired term of Supervisor Terence Hallinan, who had been elected District Attorney.

== San Francisco Board of Supervisors (1996–2001) ==
Yaki was sworn into the San Francisco Board of Supervisors on February 6, 1996, succeeding Terence Hallinan who was elected to the San Francisco District Attorney's Office. He took over Hallinan's position on various committees, including: Government Efficiency and Labor; Health, Public Safety and Environment; and the Select Committee on Public Power.

One of his first actions was organizing a Children and Youth Summit in the city. He was elected to a full four-year term in November, 1996.

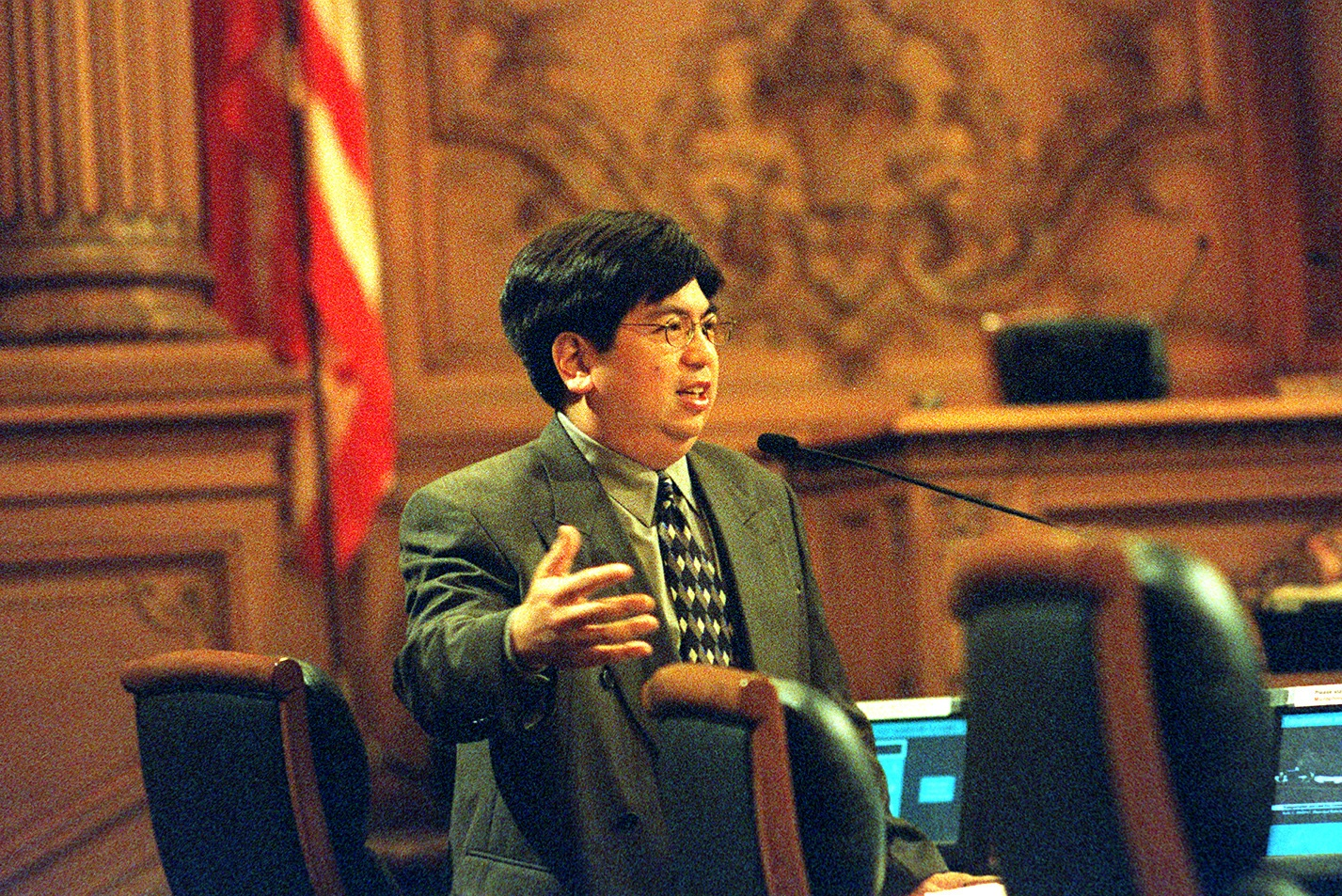
Yaki in the Board of Supervisors Chambers, 1999

Yaki was well known for his ability to broker compromises and make difficult deals, particularly when it came to thorny development issues in San Francisco. In his first months on the Board, he brokered a compromise allowing the city-wide installation of cellular towers in the still-infancy of the industry. Among the other high-profile projects he authored and shepherded through the Board included the building of the San Francisco Giants ballpark, the Mission Bay development plan, the downtown Bloomingdale's project, reforming and reorganizing the San Francisco Municipal Transportation Agency, and building an underground parking garage for Golden Gate Park He also saved a nonprofit, the Family Service Agency, from eviction, brokering a deal using City and private funds.

Yaki chaired the Economic Development and Telecommunications Committee from 1997 to 1999, was elected by his colleagues to head the San Francisco County Transportation Authority in 1999. He also served as a Director of the Golden Gate Bridge District, the Bay Area Air Quality Management District, the San Francisco Public Employees Retirement System. On the SFPERs, he authored a resolution that resulted in the pension fund being among the first in the nation to divest it tobacco stocks. He also served as a member of the executive committee of the California State Association of Counties.

== U.S. Commission on Civil Rights (2005–2022) ==
Yaki was appointed by the Congress to the Commission on Civil Rights in 2005. At the time, the commission had become increasingly polarized under the George W. Bush administration, as conservatives –including Republican appointees on the Commission itself – argued that it no longer served any useful purpose and conducted partisan investigations meant to embarrass Republicans. After 2004, when Bush appointed two conservative Commissioners who had recently canceled their Republican Party registrations to the two "independent" seats, obtaining a six-member conservative majority bloc, the Commission dramatically scaled back its activities and canceled several ongoing investigations. During the Barack Obama administration, this conservative bloc reversed its position and began using the commission as a vigorous advocate for conservative interpretations of civil rights issues, such as opposition to the Voting Rights Act and the expansion of federal hate crimes laws. For his first five years on the Commission Yaki was the frequent voice of dissent on the commission. His first dissent was on a Commission report attacking affirmative action in contracting, where his dissent was longer than the majority report.

In 2009, the Republican majority on the commission began attacking the Obama Administration for its decision in the New Black Panther Party voter intimidation case where Yaki was adamantly opposed what he believed was a "partisan" and "kangaroo court" approach to the case by the majority. Yaki, and his colleague, Arlan Melendez, issued a scathing dissent of the report, alleging that it lacked "political and intellectual integrity" from the outset.

In 2012, Yaki called for the commission to launch an investigation into Stand-your-ground laws in the aftermath of the Trayvon Martin shooting. The commission will be considering the matter during their 2013 calendar.

== Personal life ==
Yaki lives in San Francisco, California with his wife, Kristina. He is of mixed Chinese, Japanese, and Hawaiian ancestry. His mother's father was a senior diplomat for the government of China at the League of Nations, and his father retired as a senior diplomat for the U.S. State Department.

Political offices
Preceded by Terence Hallinan	Member of the San Francisco Board of Supervisors; 1996–2001	Succeeded by Jake McGoldrick
Preceded by Christopher Edley, Jr.	Commissioner on the United States Commission on Civil Rights; 2005–2022	Succeeded by Mondaire Jones
