= Christos Marafatsos =

Greek-American entrepreneur

Christos Marafatsos is a Greek American businessman and founder and Chairman of Greek Americans for Trump. Marafatsos is a lobbyist for Greek construction company Aktor Group

== Career ==
Marafatsos previously owned an investment firm registered at his parents' home in Maryland.

In 2025, Marafatsos was honored as an Archon of the Ecumenical Patriarchate by the Eastern Orthodox Church.

=== 2016 Trump campaign ===
In 2016, Marafatsos became a leader of the National Diversity Coalition for Trump in his 2016 presidential campaign.

=== Greek lobbying role ===
In September 2026, The Wall Street Journal published a piece on Marafatsos' relationship with US Ambassador to Greece and Donald Trump Jr.'s former fiancée, Kimberly Guilfoyle. Marafatsos was described as Guilfoyle's "unofficial gatekeeper", joining her for meetings with government officials across Europe and at her ambassadorial residence, including meetings where his role as a paid lobbyist for Aktor was not disclosed. WSJ cited federal lobbying reports that show Aktor paid Marafatsos $160,000 through June 2026 to build relationships with the Executive Office of the President, Department of State, and Department of Energy.

On October 1, 2026, Gregory W. Meeks, Ranking Member of the House Foreign Affairs Committee, sent Secretary of State Marco Rubio a letter seeking answers to questions about Ambassador Guilfoyle's relationship with Christos Marafatsos. Meeks wrote that "If these reports are accurate, Ambassador Guilfoyle is unfit to represent the United States abroad and should be removed from her position."
