= Vincent Hallinan =

American lawyer and politician (1896–1992)

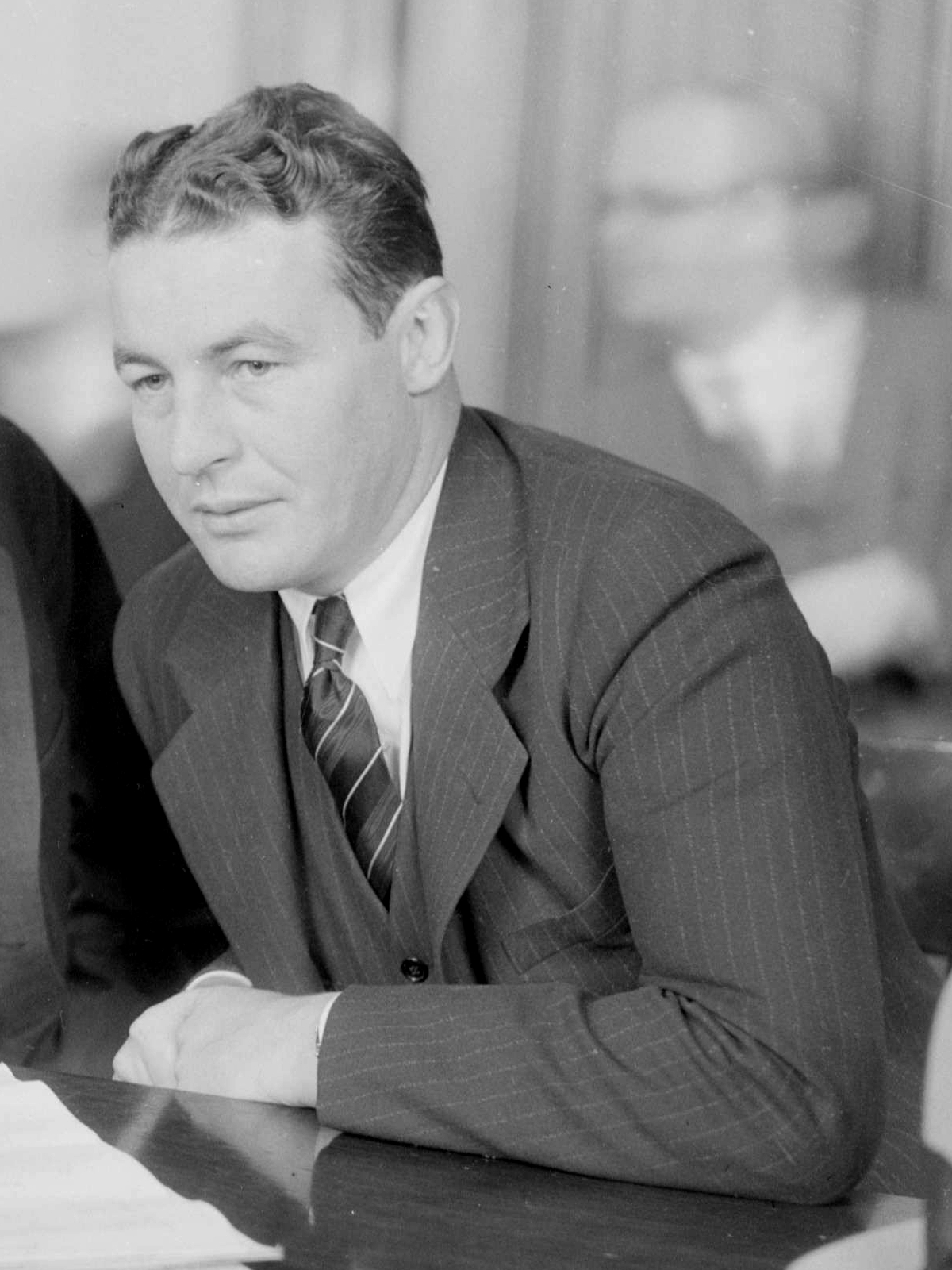
- Hallinan c. 1932

Personal details
- Born: Vincent William Hallinan; December 16, 1896 San Francisco, California, U.S.
- Died: October 2, 1992 (aged 95) San Francisco, California, U.S.
- Party: Progressive
- Children: 6, including Terence
- Education: Saint Ignatius College
- Occupation: Lawyer

Vincent William Hallinan (December 16, 1896 – October 2, 1992) was an American lawyer and candidate for President of the United States in the 1952 election on the Progressive Party ticket.

== Early life and education ==
Hallinan was born into a large immigrant Irish Catholic family in San Francisco. The son of Elizabeth (Sheehan) and Patrick Hallinan, he was raised in the city and in Petaluma, California. His father was said to be a member of the Irish National Invincibles, a revolutionary organization that, among other activities, was reputed to have assassinated the Chief Secretary for Ireland and his secretary in 1882 (the infamous Phoenix Park Murders). Allegedly, the elder Hallinan had fled to the U.S. after the murders. The elder Hallinan became a streetcar conductor in San Francisco, and was one of the leaders of the Great Front Strike of 1899–1900.

Trained by Jesuits in high school, Hallinan passed the California Bar Examination at the age of 22, after studies at Saint Ignatius College and Law School (now the University of San Francisco). He passed the bar exam on the first attempt and before he had graduated from law school.

== Career ==
Hallinan's early successes in court included personal injury actions against the powerful Market Street Railway Company which ran most of the trolley lines on the streets of San Francisco and was a subsidiary of northern California rail interests. The rail company also owned the system whereby jurors' lists were kept and consulted by an appointed jury commissioner, in Hallinan's time an official of the railway, and he fought against this system for years before state law made the voter rolls the sole source of jurors.

Hallinan's years as a lawyer led to his selection in 1949, with partner James Martin McInnis, to defend Harry Bridges of the International Longshore and Warehouse Union on perjury charges arising from accusations that he had once been a Communist but had denied it. Hallinan received a contempt of court citation during the high-profile trial, and afterward spent six months in McNeil Island federal prison in Washington state. He was subsequently disbarred for 3 years by the State Bar of California but appealed his disbarment after his release from jail.

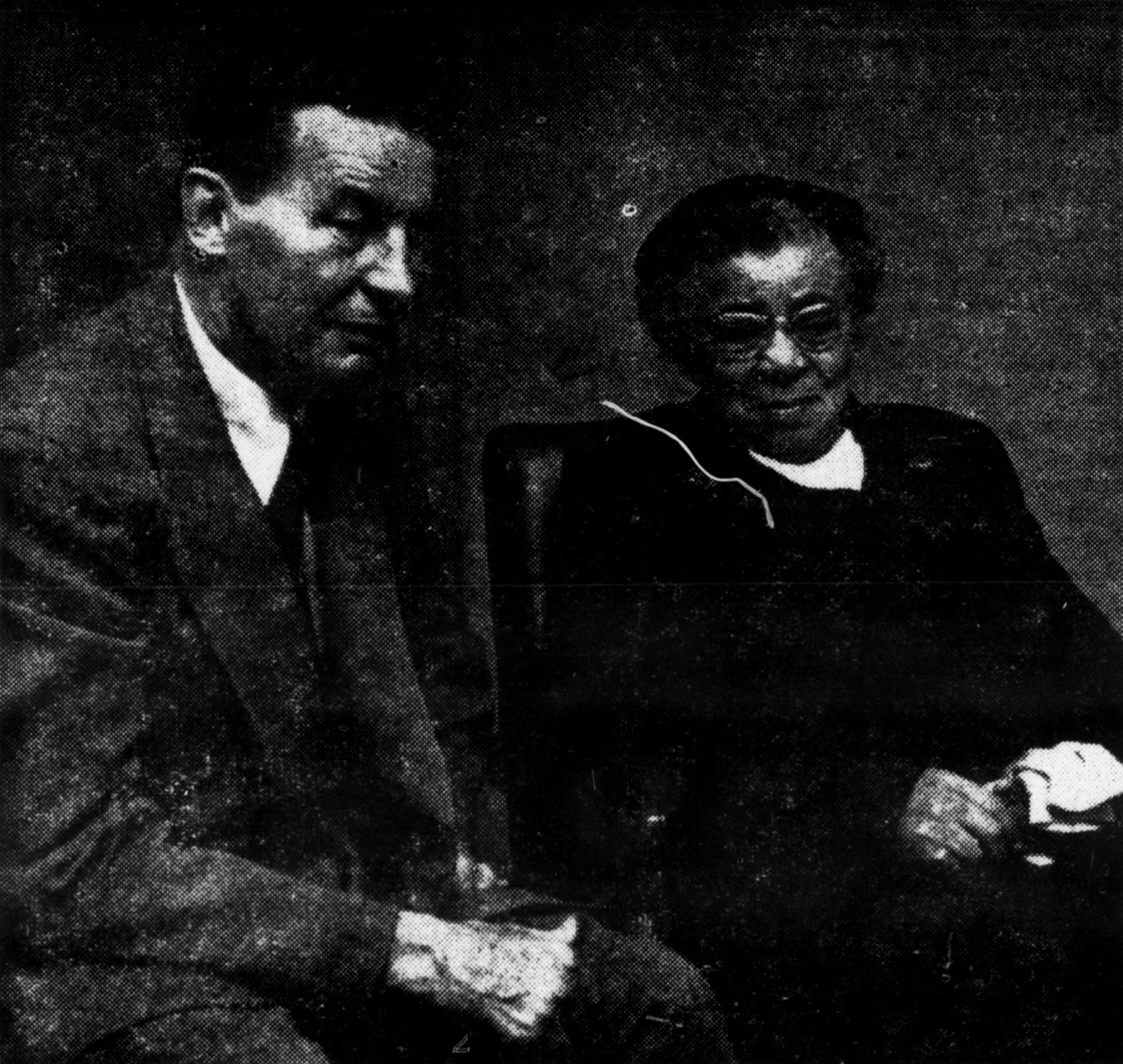
Hallinan with his running mate, Charlotta Bass, 1952

Hallinan ran for President of the United States in the 1952 election, as the candidate for Henry Wallace's Progressive Party and was the third highest polling candidate in the election receiving more than 140,000 votes. His running mate, Charlotta A. Bass, was the first African American woman chosen by a party as a vice-presidential candidate.

In 1953, Hallinan and his wife, Vivian (Moore), were indicted on 14 counts of tax evasion. After a three-week trial, on November 14, 1953, Hallinan was convicted on five counts of tax evasion, for evading $36,739 in federal income taxes after he reported only 20% of his income from 1947 to 1950. On December 8, 1953, he was sentenced to 18 months and a fine of $50,000 plus costs. His wife was acquitted.

In the 1956 election, Hallinan endorsed Socialist Workers Party presidential candidate Farrell Dobbs.

Hallinan visited U-2 pilot Gary Powers in Moscow soon after Powers’ conviction in the Soviet Union for espionage. He encouraged Powers to "study the Communist form of government, stating it was a "remarkable system...realizing the American system had grave flaws", and if he were to study it Powers "would learn a great deal."

In his 1963 autobiography, Hallinan claimed that he was prosecuted by the IRS for his political views, and that the government did not differentiate between tax avoidance (legal) and tax evasion. Also in his autobiography he argued for prison reform and in favor of treating drug addiction as a medical condition and providing clean maintenance drugs to addicts, and legalizing prostitution; and against laws forbidding private consensual sex, contraception and abortion, and against imperialism and American foreign policy.

== Personal life ==
Hallinan was the father of six sons, including writer Conn M. Hallinan, San Francisco attorney Patrick Hallinan, and politician Terence Hallinan. He had several grandchildren.

Despite his Jesuit education, Vincent Hallinan was a militant atheist.

Hallinan died on October 2, 1992.

Party political offices
Preceded by Henry A. Wallace	Progressive Party nominee for President of the United States; 1952	Succeeded by None
