= 2003 San Francisco District Attorney election =

- November 4, 2003 (jungle primary); December 9, 2003 (runoff)
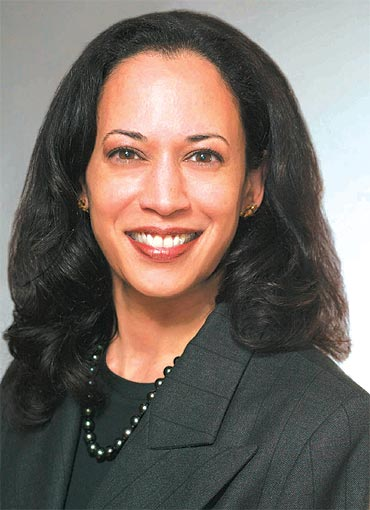

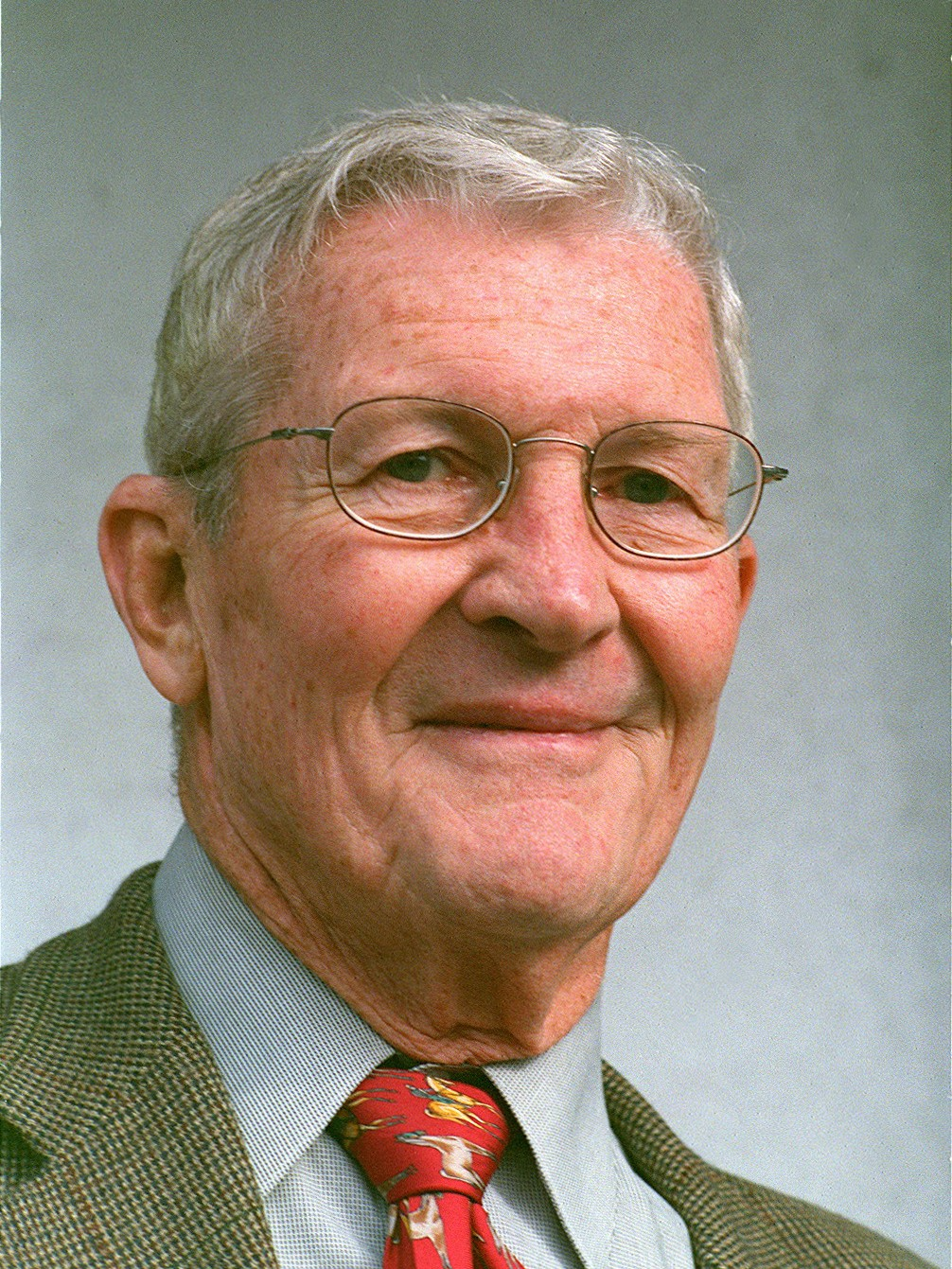

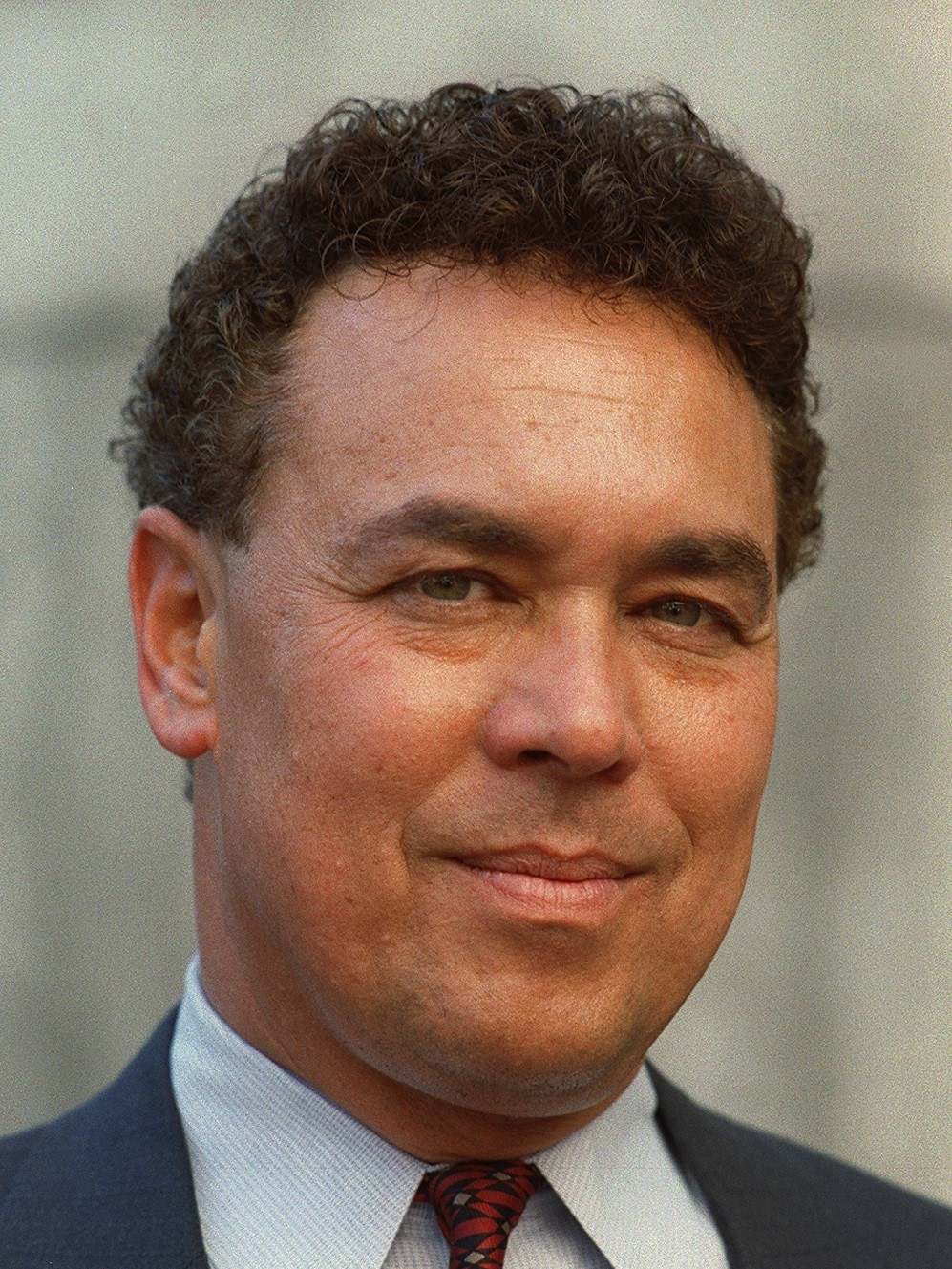
Candidate	Kamala Harris	Terence Hallinan	Bill Fazio
Party	Democratic	Democratic	Democratic
First round vote	66,248	70,580	59,834
First round percentage	33.65%	35.85%	30.39%
Runoff vote	137,111	105,617
Runoff percentage	56.49%	43.51%
- Runoff electoral results by supervisorial district Harris: 50–60% 60–70% Hallinan: 50–60%
District Attorney before election
Terence Hallinan
Democratic
Elected District Attorney
Kamala Harris
Democratic

The 2003 San Francisco District Attorney election was held on November 4, 2003, to elect the next District Attorney of San Francisco. The election, which was held alongside the 2003 mayoral election in which Supervisor Gavin Newsom won his first term as Mayor of San Francisco, was won by former assistant District Attorney Kamala Harris, who defeated the incumbent District Attorney, Terence Hallinan.

== Results ==
San Francisco District Attorney election, 2003
Party	Candidate	Votes	%
Democratic	Terence Hallinan	70,580	35.85
Democratic	Kamala Harris	66,248	33.65
Democratic	Bill Fazio	59,834	30.39
Write-in		230	0.12
Total votes		196,892	100
Runoff election
Democratic	Kamala Harris	137,111	56.49
Democratic	Terence Hallinan	105,617	43.51
Total votes		242,728	100
