= List of people from Palo Alto =

This is a list of notable people from Palo Alto, California. It includes people who were born/raised in, lived in, or spent portions of their lives in Palo Alto, or for whom Palo Alto is a significant part of their identity.

== Actors ==
- Zach Appelman, actor known for the television series Sleepy Hollow, born and raised in Palo Alto and is a Palo Alto High alumnus
- Aarón Díaz, Mexican American actor, singer, and model; born in Puerto Vallarta, Mexico, raised in Palo Alto
- Polly Draper, actress, screenplay writer, producer, and director; was in the television program Thirtysomething; raised in Palo Alto
- Dave Franco, actor, born in Palo Alto
- James Franco, actor, director, screenwriter, producer, artist, and author, born in Palo Alto
- Neva Gerber, silent screen actress, moved to Palo Alto after she married San Francisco oil geologist Edward F. Nolan
- Charles Haid, actor and director known for Hill Street Blues, graduated from Palo Alto High in 1961
- Teri Hatcher, actress known for Desperate Housewives and Lois & Clark: The New Adventures of Superman, born in Palo Alto
- Amy Irving, actress known for Crossing Delancey and Yentl, born in Palo Alto
- Željko Ivanek, actor known for 24, Damages, and Madam Secretary, Ellwood P. Cubberley High School alumnus
- Ellen K, radio personality and television host, born in Palo Alto
- Brandis Kemp, actress known for television series Fridays
- Kaja Martin, actress and film producer, involved in Riley Rewind, born and raised in Palo Alto
- Shemar Moore, actor and model, Gunn High School alumnus
- Rick Rossovich, actor known for Top Gun, Roxanne, and The Terminator
- Alessandra Torresani, actress known for Caprica, born and raised in Palo Alto
- Bree Turner, actress known for the television series Grimm, born in Palo Alto
- Sheila Vand, actress known for her role in Argo, raised in Palo Alto

== Visual arts ==
=== Fine artists ===
- Carrie Abramovitz (1913–1999), sculptor, collagist, painter, and economist
- Jeremy Anderson (1921–1982), wood sculptor and professor, graduated from Palo Alto High School
- Greg Brown (1951–2014), trompe-l'oeil muralist, grew up in Palo Alto and graduated from Palo Alto High School in 1969
- Margo Davis, photographer, lived in Palo Alto for over 30 years
- Terry Acebo Davis, fine artist and chairperson of the Palo Alto Public Art Commission
- Pedro Joseph de Lemos, painter, printmaker, architect, illustrator, writer, lecturer, and museum director, lived and died in Palo Alto
- Edward McNeil Farmer, watercolorist, oil painter, and professor at Stanford University, lived in Palo Alto and was active in the Pacific Art League (previously known as Palo Alto Art Club)
- Donald Farnsworth, fine art master printmaker, born in Palo Alto
- Helen Katharine Forbes, muralist and painter, grew up in Palo Alto
- Tom Franco, artist and actor, grew up in Palo Alto and attended Palo Alto High School, graduating in 1998
- James Gurney, illustrator, artist, and creator of the Dinotopia world, grew up in Palo Alto
- Ollie Johnston, Academy Award–winning Disney animator, known for Snow White and the Seven Dwarfs and Fantasia
- Nina Katchadourian, artist, attended Gunn High School
- Paula Kirkeby (1934–2016), art collector, art donor, and the director and founder of the commercial art gallery, Smith Andersen Gallery, and printshops, Smith Andersen Editions and 3EP Ltd. Press
- Bertha Elizabeth Stringer Lee (1869–1937), California impressionist painter, died in Palo Alto
- Elizabeth Norton (1887–1985), bronze sculptor, printmaker, painter, and one of the founders of the Palo Alto Art Club (now known as the Pacific Art League)
- Nathan Oliveira, painter and educator in the Bay Area Figurative Movement, maintained his art studio in Palo Alto
- ORFN (born Aaron Curry; 1974–2016), street artist and graffiti writer
- Yvonne Rainer, modern dancer and filmmaker
- John Aloysius Stanton (1857–1929), painter, academic administrator, and professor
- Cloyd Jonathan Sweigert, political cartoonist for the San Francisco Chronicle, California Impressionist painter, and member of the Pacific Art League (previously known as Palo Alto Art Club)
- Jimmy Swinnerton, cartoonist and fine art painter, maintained a house in Palo Alto for many years
- Jacqueline Thurston, visual artist and writer, has lived in Palo Alto for many years
- Shirley Williamson (1875–1944), California Impressionist painter, monotype printer, and member of the Pacific Art League (previously known as Palo Alto Art Club), lived in Palo Alto for many years

=== Designers ===
- Arthur Bridgman Clark (1866–1949), architect, professor, first mayor of Mayfield, and first head of the Art Department at Stanford University
- Birge Clark (1893–1989), architect, worked largely in the Spanish Colonial Revival style around Palo Alto
- Lisa Hanawalt (born 1983), illustrator, cartoonist, production designer and producer; executive produced the Netflix animated series, Tuca & Bertie; born and raised in Palo Alto
- Michael Manwaring (born 1942), designer, artist, and one of the founders of the San Francisco Bay Area postmodern movement in graphic design; born and raised in Palo Alto
- Michael H. Riley, Emmy Award-nominated motion graphics designer and art director, grew up in Palo Alto
- Sigrid Lorenzen Rupp, architect and artist, specialized in designing facilities for tech companies in Silicon Valley

== Business leaders and entrepreneurs ==
- Sergey Brin (born 1973), co-founder of Google
- Thomas Foon Chew, founder of Bayside Canning Company in 1918
- Tim Cook (born 1960), CEO of Apple Inc. since 2011
- Debbi Fields (born 1956), founder of Mrs. Fields Bakeries
- David Filo (born 1966), co-founder of Yahoo! Inc.
- Jack Herrick, founder of wikiHow
- William Hewlett (1913–2001), co-founder of technology company Hewlett-Packard; buried at Alta Mesa Cemetery in Palo Alto
- Reid Hoffman, co-founder and executive chairman of LinkedIn
- Mark Hurd (1957–2019), former joint CEO of Oracle Corporation; past chairman, chief executive officer, and president of Hewlett-Packard
- Steve Jobs (1955–2011), co-founder of Apple Inc., lived in Palo Alto (1980–2011); buried at Alta Mesa Cemetery in Palo Alto
- Jawed Karim, co-founder of YouTube
- Darren Kimura, founder of Sopogy and inventor of MicroCSP solar technolog
- William R. Larson, founder of Round Table Pizza
- Marissa Mayer, CEO and president of Yahoo!; former vice president of search products and user experience at Google
- Chip Morningstar, software developer; project leader for Lucasfilm's Habitat, the first large-scale virtual multiuser environment; current resident
- Stephen Neal, chairman of Cooley LLP; current resident
- David Packard (1912–1996), co-founder of technology company Hewlett-Packard; buried at Alta Mesa Cemetery in Palo Alto
- Larry Page, co-founder and CEO of Google; current resident
- Vishal Sikka, ex-CEO of Infosys, ex-CTO of SAP AG
- Owen Van Natta, COO of Facebook, CEO of Myspace, COO of Zynga
- Romesh Wadhwani, founder and chairman of Symphony Technology Group
- Anne Wojcicki, co-founder and CEO of 23andMe
- Jerry Yang, co-founder and former CEO of Yahoo! Inc.
- Mark Zuckerberg, co-founder and CEO of Facebook

== Musicians ==
- Christine Abraham, opera singer and voice teacher; grew up in Palo Alto
- William Ackerman, acoustic guitarist, founded influential New Age record label Windham Hill Records
- Joan Baez, folk singer, went to school in Palo Alto, now resides in Woodside, California
- Lindsey Buckingham, musician, singer, songwriter, and producer, best known as lead guitarist and one of the vocalists of the musical group Fleetwood Mac, born and raised in Palo Alto
- Doug Clifford, drummer of Creedence Clearwater Revival and Palo Alto native
- The Donnas, rock group, met while growing up in Palo Alto; graduated from Palo Alto High in 1997
- The Grateful Dead, rock "jam" band; early incarnations of the band were based in Palo Alto
  - Jerry Garcia (1942–1995), founding member of the Grateful Dead; moved to Palo Alto in the 1960s
  - Bill Kreutzmann (born 1946), founding member and drummer of the Grateful Dead; born and raised in Palo Alto
  - Ron "Pigpen" McKernan (1945–1973), founding member of the Grateful Dead; moved to Palo Alto as a teenager; buried at Alta Mesa Memorial Park
- Stephan Jenkins, rock musician with Third Eye Blind and Gunn High School alumnus (1983)
- The Kingston Trio, folk group, formed in Palo Alto while its members were enrolled at Stanford University and nearby Menlo College
- Rick Nowels, pop music record producer and songwriter
- Virginia Seay, composer and musicologist, born in Palo Alto in 1922
- Matt Simons, singer-songwriter, born and raised in Palo Alto; graduated from Gunn High School in 2005
- Grace Slick, singer with the rock group Jefferson Airplane, later known as Jefferson Starship
- Molly Tuttle, singer-songwriter, banjo player, guitarist, recording artist, and teacher in the bluegrass tradition, raised in Palo Alto and attended Palo Alto High School
- Ugly Kid Joe, rock band; members Whitfield Crane and Klaus Eichstadt grew up in Palo Alto, as did producer Eric Valentine
- Remi Wolf, indie pop singer-songwriter, born and raised in Palo Alto; graduated from Palo Alto High School in 2014

== Politicians, political figures and civil servants ==
- Robert Bell, Virginia State Delegate, born in Palo Alto
- Ron Christie, former advisor to Vice President Dick Cheney and political pundit
- Jerry Daniels, CIA officer in Laos during the Vietnam War
- Herbert Hoover, 31st president of the United States; starting in 1916, maintained a home in Palo Alto
- Jon Huntsman, Jr., former governor of Utah and U.S. ambassador to China
- Merrill Newman (born 1928), Palo Alto Channing House resident, former U.S. Army officer, and Korean War veteran, noted for his 2013 arrest in North Korea
- Guy H. Preston, U.S. Army brigadier general
- JB Pritzker, governor of Illinois and member of the Pritzker family
- Condoleezza Rice, former U.S. secretary of state
- Thomas T. Riley, former U.S. ambassador to Morocco
- Manabendra Nath Roy, Indian nationalist and revolutionary
- Byron Sher (1928–2026), served in the California State Senate 1996–2004, and California State Assembly 1980–1996; professor emeritus at Stanford Law School
- Sarah Wallis (1825–1905), first president of the California Woman Suffrage Educational Association
- Ron Wyden, U.S. senator

== Religion ==
- John Duryea, former Palo Alto Catholic priest excommunicated by the church in the 1970s
- Gerrit W. Gong, member of the Quorum of the Twelve Apostles of the Church of Jesus Christ of Latter-day Saints (LDS Church), raised in Palo Alto
- Indradyumna Swami (formerly Brian Tibbitts), ISKCON Guru and a sannyasi for the International Society for Krishna Consciousness, born and raised in Palo Alto

== Scientists ==
- Richard R. Ernst, Nobel laureate in chemistry, worked at Varian Associates in Palo Alto
- Gene F. Franklin, control engineer and NASA scientist
- Michio Kaku, theoretical physicist, author, and college professor; attended Cubberly High School and built an atom smasher in his parents' garage
- Brian Kobilka, Nobel laureate in chemistry, lives in Palo Alto
- Arthur Kornberg (1918–2007), Nobel prize-winning biochemist
- Pamela Melroy, astronaut and second woman to command a space shuttle mission
- Maryam Mirzakhani (1977–2017), Iranian mathematician and professor of mathematics at Stanford University
- James G. Moore (born 1930), geologist, born in Palo Alto
- Ida Shepard Oldroyd, conchologist and curator (1856–1940)
- Perley Ason Ross, physicist who worked on essential problems in the behavior of X-rays
- William Shockley, Nobel laureate in physics and eugenicist
- Robert Spinrad (1932–2009), computer pioneer as director of the Xerox Palo Alto Research Center
- Sidney Dean Townley, astronomer, geodeticist, and Stanford University professor emeritus

== Writers ==
- David M. Alexander, attorney and science-fiction and crime novelist
- Jordan Allen-Dutton, screenplay writer and producer of theatre, raised in Palo Alto
- Renée Ashley, poet, novelist, essayist, and educator, born in Palo Alto
- Raymond Carver, short story writer and poet
- Erle Stanley Gardner, crime novelist and creator of Perry Mason
- Ariel Gore (born 1970), journalist, memoirist, and novelist author, raised in Palo Alto
- Ken Kesey (1935–2001), novelist, short story writer, playwright, and author of One Flew Over the Cuckoo's Nest, which he finished writing while living in a cottage in Palo Alto
- Marty Klein (b. 1950), sex therapist, author, educator, and public policy analyst
- Michael Lederer, author
- John Markoff, Pulitzer prize winner and former New York Times technology journalist; grew up in Palo Alto and has lived there for many years
- Chanel Miller (b. 1990), victim of sexual assault and author of best-selling memoir Know My Name
- Azadeh Moaveni (b. 1976), Iranian-American journalist and author, born in Palo Alto; author of Lipstick Jihad: A Memoir of Growing up Iranian in America and American in Iran
- Jim Newton, journalist for the Los Angeles Times
- Julia Flynn Siler, journalist and nonfiction author
- Keith Raffel, crime novelist, tech entrepreneur, syndicated columnist, and university lecturer
- Ron Unz (b. 1961), far-right writer
- Andrea U'Ren, children's book author and illustrator
- Tad Williams, New York Times best-selling author
- Yvor Winters, poet, known as the "Sage of Palo Alto"
- Al Young (1939–2021), poet, educator, novelist, and essayist, lived in Palo Alto for almost three decades
- Jessica Yu (b. 1966), screenplay writer and film director, attended Gunn High School

== Athletes ==
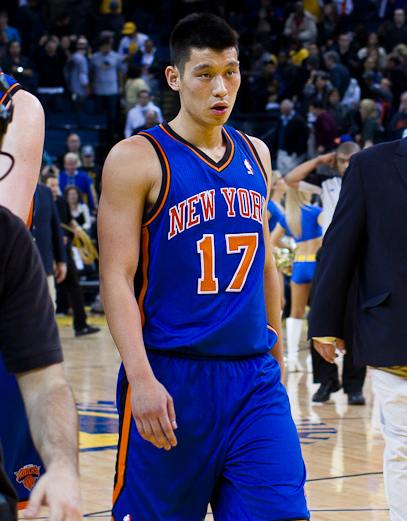
Jeremy Lin

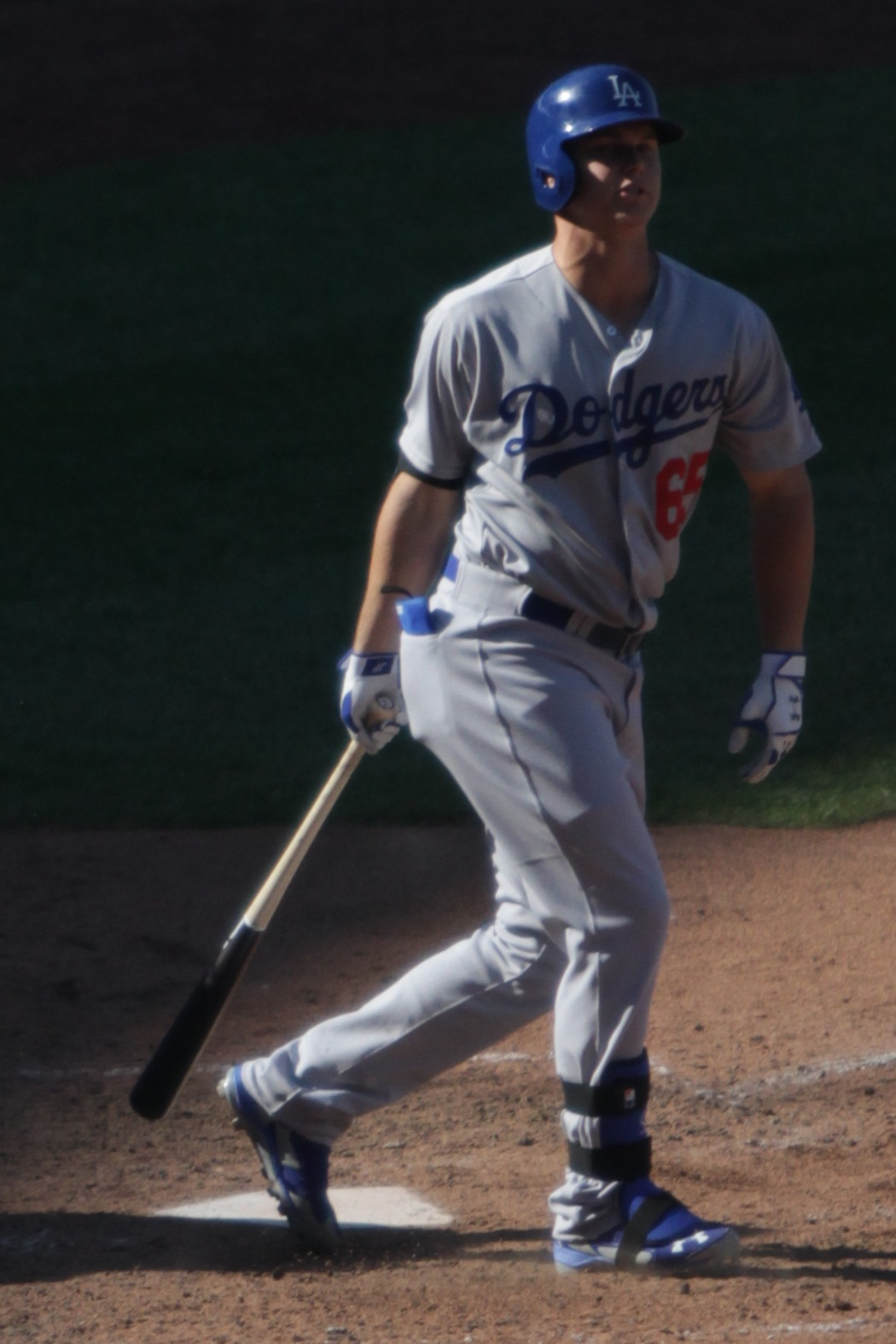
Joc Pederson

- Davante Adams, NFL wide receiver for the Las Vegas Raiders, East Palo Alto resident and Palo Alto High School graduate
- Harris Barton (born 1964), All Pro NFL offensive lineman
- Matt Biondi (born 1965), swimmer and winner of 11 Olympic medals (8 gold), born in Palo Alto
- Hunter Bishop (born 1998), baseball player
- Paul Blanchette (born 1994), soccer player
- Nick Bravin (born 1971), Olympic fencer
- Sebastian DeFrancesco, paralympic athlete and table tennis player
- Jim Harbaugh, former football player and current head coach of the Los Angeles Chargers, graduated from Palo Alto High School in 1982
- Tony Hargain, NFL player
- Phil Hellmuth, professional poker player, holds a record 16 WSOP bracelets with total earnings of more than $25 million to date
- Katie Hoff, Olympic swimmer, Palo Alto native
- Adam Juratovac, professional football player and Arena Bowl XXIII champion alumnus of Gunn High School
- Dana Kirk, Olympic swimmer, coaches for Palo Alto Stanford Aquatics
- Tara Kirk, Olympic swimmer, swam with Palo Alto Stanford Aquatics; American record holder in 100 and 200-yard (180 m) breaststroke
- Hilary Knight, PHWL ice hockey player, 1-time Olympic gold medal winner, 9-time Women's World Championships winner
- Trajan Langdon, basketball executive and former player
- Francie Larrieu-Smith, long-distance runner and first female athlete to make five Olympic teams, born in Palo Alto
- Jeremy Lin (born 1988), basketball player, formerly for the NBA's Toronto Raptors, alumnus of Palo Alto High School
- Jim Loscutoff, basketball player who won seven NBA championships with the Boston Celtics
- Don MacLean, UCLA and NBA basketball player
- Bob Melvin (born 1961), Major League Baseball player and manager of the San Francisco Giants
- Joc Pederson (born 1992), baseball player for the Arizona Diamondbacks
- Dan Petry, pitcher for 1984 World Series champion Detroit Tigers, born in Palo Alto
- Tim Rossovich, professional football player
- Dave Schultz, Olympic gold medalist and World Champion in freestyle wrestling, subject of film Foxcatcher
- Mark Schultz, Olympic gold medalist and two-time World Champion in freestyle wrestling, subject of film Foxcatcher
- Nolan Siegel, IndyCar driver
- Pop Warner, early football player and head coach of eight colleges including Stanford University (1924–1932), lived and died in Palo Alto
- Charles Wright, professional wrestler, formerly worked for WWE as Papa Shango and The Godfather
- Steve Young, former professional football player for the San Francisco 49ers and NFL Hall of Famer
- Vincent Zhou, figure skater, attended the 2018 Winter Olympics

== See also ==
- List of people from Oakland, California
- List of people from San Francisco
- List of people from San Jose, California
- List of people from Santa Cruz, California
