= Pacific Art League =

Arts organization in Palo Alto, California

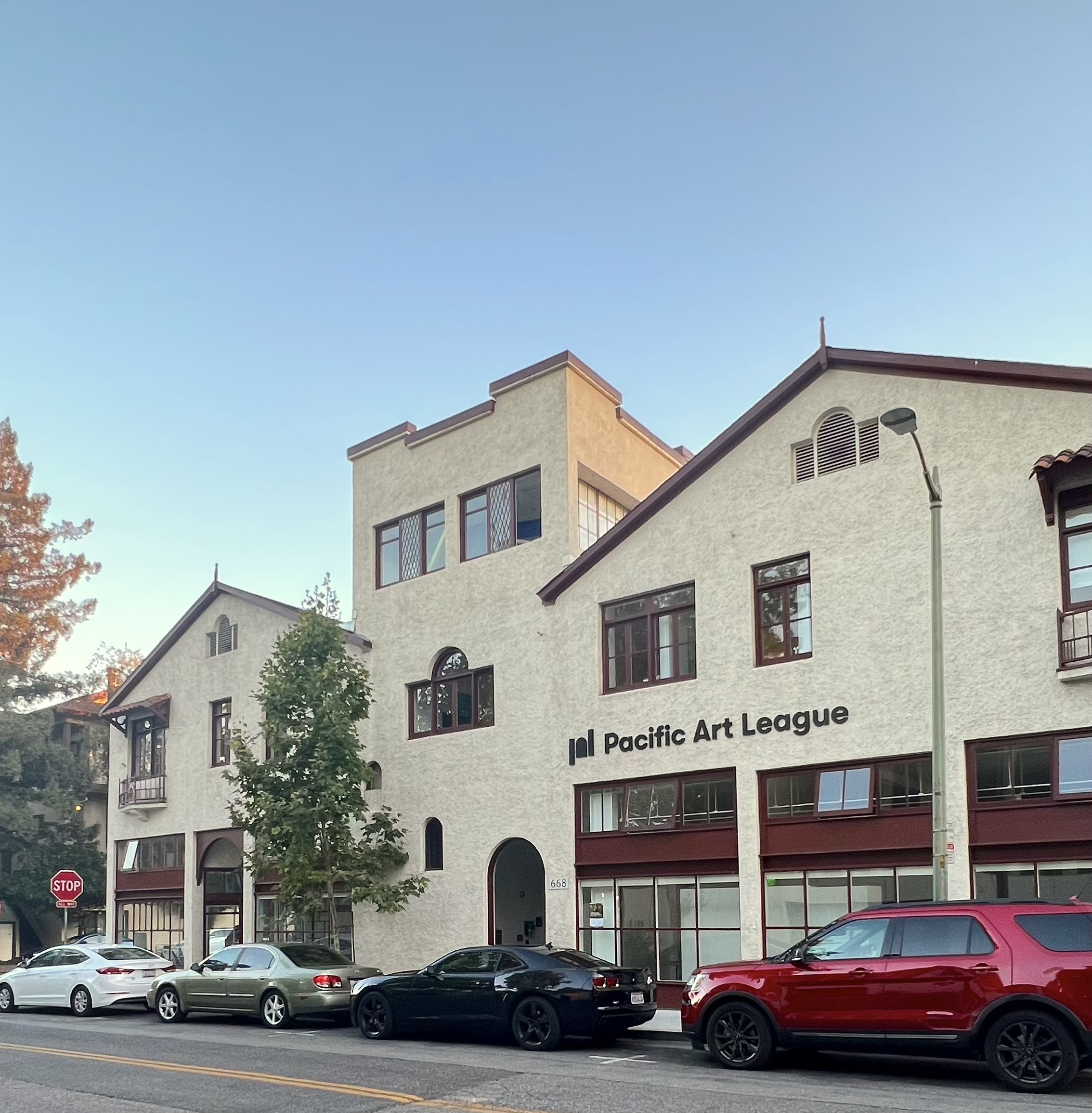
- Pacific Art League (2022)
- Formation: 1921; 105 years ago
- Type: non governmental arts organization
- Purpose: arts education, arts exhibition
- Headquarters: 668 Ramona Street, Palo Alto, California, United States
- Coordinates: 37°26′38″N 122°09′36.2″W
- Website: pacificartleague.org
- Formerly called: Palo Alto Art Club

The Pacific Art League (PAL), formerly known as the Palo Alto Art Club was founded in 1921 in Palo Alto, California and is a membership-run nonprofit arts organization, school, and gallery. The group is located in a historic building at 668 Ramona Street in downtown Palo Alto.

== Enrollment and employment ==
The Pacific Art League employs roughly 35-40 instructors and as of 2017, has over 2,000 students enrolled per quarter. Classes are on a quarterly system, and additionally they offer workshops and summer camps. From 2019–2020, director of PAL was Lisa Coscino.

== History ==
The Palo Alto Art Club was founded in 1921. The initial founders of the club were around 40 artists of upper class and many were connected to Stanford University. In the beginning, the club met at member's houses, later they met at the Palo Alto Library, and by 1926, they moved to 340 Melville Avenue. In 1952, the group moved to 855 Cowper Street due to the popularity of classes. Over time the club became more democratic and community-centered, it is now a nonprofit.

In 1965, PAL purchased thebuilding and moved to its current location at 668 Ramona Street, in a historical Spanish Revival building designed by Birge Clark. In 2014, the building had a $4 million renovation which included compliance with the American Disabilities Act and seismic retrofit.

In 1984, the name changed from Palo Alto Art Club to the current, Pacific Art League.

== Notable artists ==
This is a list of notable artists that were members, teachers of the Pacific Art League and/or showed their art work in the exhibitions, listed by last name in alphabetical order.

- Greg Brown (1951–2014) Palo Alto-local muralist.
- Arthur Bridgman Clark (1866–1949), the first head of the Art and Architecture Department at Stanford University, and first mayor of the town of Mayfield.
- Birge Clark (1893–1989) Architect associated with Spanish Colonial Revival architecture.
- Terry Acebo Davis (born 1953)
- Pedro Joseph de Lemos (1882–1954) an early member of PAL.
- Edward McNeil Farmer (1901–1969)
- Mabel McKibben Farmer (1903–1956)
- Helen Katharine Forbes (1891–1945)
- Eva Joseph Goldsheid (1926–2016)
- Ralph Johonnot (1880–1940)
- Tom Killion (born 1953) woodcut and linoleum printmaker.
- Marianne Kolb (born 1958)
- Bonnie E. Malott (1886–1988)
- Elizabeth Norton (1887–1985), bronze sculptor, printmaker and painter, she was one of the first founders of PAL.
- George Rivera (artist)
- Sigrid Lorenzen Rupp (1943–2004)
- Ray Strong (1905–2006)
- Cloyd Jonathan Sweigert (1897–1973) political cartoonist and California Impressionist painter.
- John Edward Walker (1880–1940), California Impressionist painter.
- Florence Wideman (1893–1989)
- Shirley Williamson (1875–1944), California Impressionist painter.

== See also ==
- Allied Arts Guild
