= Roger Minick =

American photographer (born 1944)

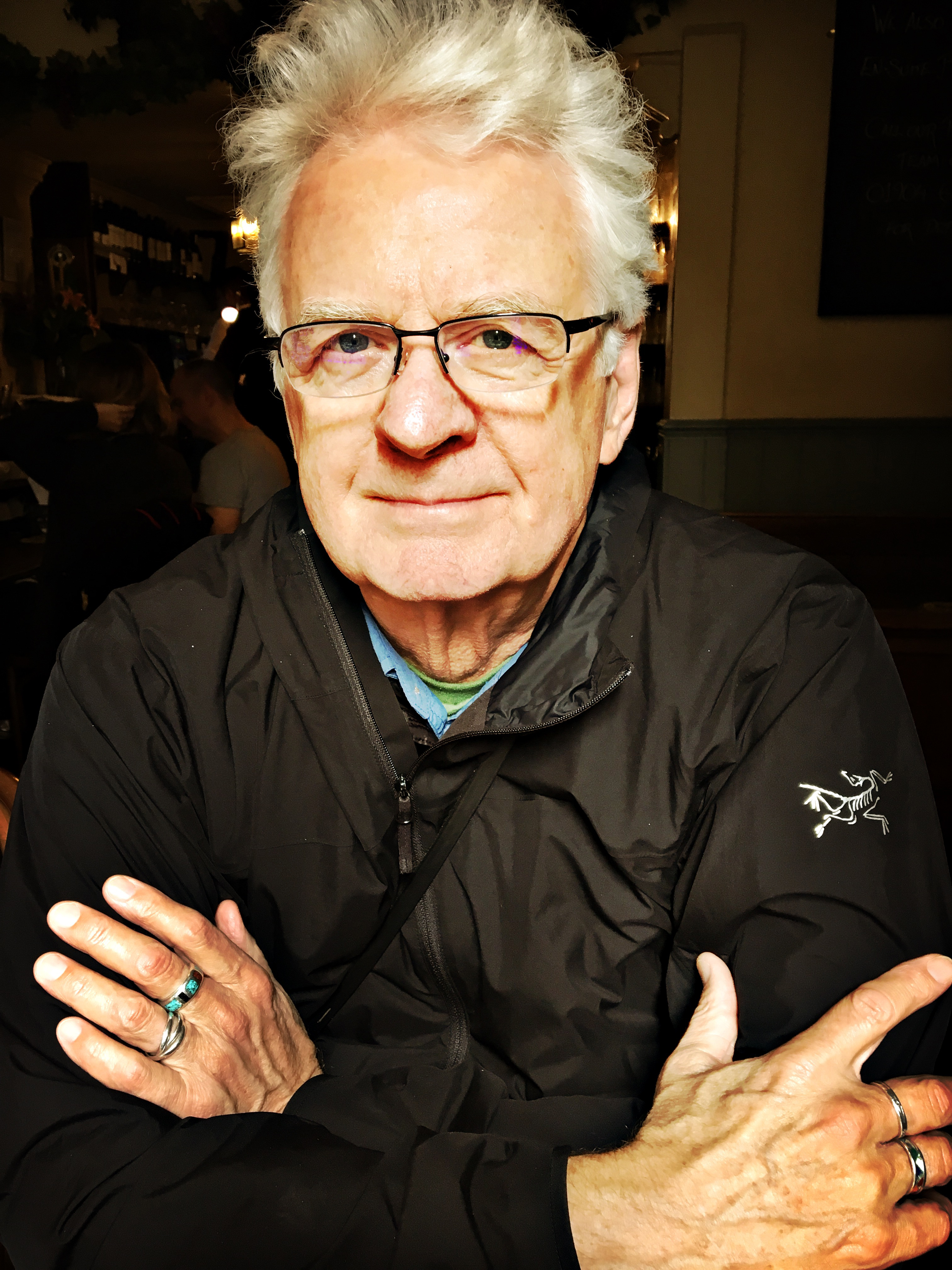
- Born: Roger Minick; July 13, 1944 (age 81); Ramona, Oklahoma
- Occupations: Photographer, Teacher
- Website: www.rogerminick.com

Roger Laell Minick (born July 13, 1944) is an American photographer who has documented tourists in the National Parks of the United States. The series, called "Sightseer", has been published in numerous books and widely exhibited in galleries and museums in the United States and Europe. Minick has worked on numerous other photo projects over the years. His books include Delta West (1969) and Hills of Home (1975), both published by Scrimshaw.

== Early life and education ==
Roger Minick was born in Ramona, Oklahoma, and grew up in the Ozarks of Arkansas. In 1956 his family moved to Southern California, where he lived until he was twenty years old. From 1964 to 1969 Minick attended the University of California, Berkeley, graduating with a BA in History in 1969. While at UC Berkeley, Minick began an apprenticeship in photography at the ASUC Studio, a student arts facility on the UC campus.

== Early career ==
From 1965 to 1975, Minick worked on staff at the ASUC Studio, eventually becoming Director from 1971 to 1975.

It was at the ASUC Studio when Minick began his first photo project, a documentary project in black and white on the land and people of the Sacramento-San Joaquin River Delta in California. A resulting book, Delta West (Scrimshaw Press, 1969), an award-winning book which was listed as one of "Fifty Best Books of the Year" by the American Institute of Graphic Arts, AIGA, was published in 1970. Also in that same year, Life Magazine published an image from Delta West, titled "Cheng's Hands, 1966".

For Minick's next photo project on the rural Ozark Mountains of Arkansas begun in 1969, he received a Guggenheim Fellowship in 1972. At the completion of this project a book resulted, titled Hills of Home (Scrimshaw Press, 1975; Ballantine Books, 1976), which was a collaboration with his father Bob Minick who wrote a text consisting of stories and remembrances from the Ozarks. Also included in the book were etchings and lithographs by photographer Leonard Sussman.

While at the Studio, in addition to co-designing his own book Delta West (with photographer Dave Bohn), and designing his own book Hills of Home, Minick worked with other photographers designing their books: Margo Davis' Antigua Black (1973), Richard Misrach's Telegraph 3 AM (1974), and Steve Fitch's Diesels and Dinosaurs (1976).

== Mid-career years ==
The year 1974 marked a turning point in Minick's photography, when his photographic interests shifted from the rural landscape to the urban landscape. Images for his "The Southland Series", consisting of freeways, vernacular architecture, and portraits of people at fast-food outlets and shopping plazas in Southern California, were made between 1974 and 1976.

In 1977, Minick worked on a two-year National Endowment for the Arts Photo Survey project on the Mexican American community. This project, referred to as Espejo in an exhibition catalogue at the time, was co-sponsored by the Mexican American Legal Defense and Educational Fund and the National Endowment for the Arts. Work from this project, which included five other photographers (Abigail Heyman, Mary Ellen Mark, Louis Bernal, Morrie Camhi, Neal Slavin), was exhibited at the Oakland Museum of California) in 1979. Under the auspices of the National Endowment for the Arts grant, Minick completed four photo projects: portraits of residents in East Los Angeles taken in front of street murals (one image featured in the Asco (art collective) exhibit, Elite of the Obscure at the Los Angeles County Museum of Art; undocumented field workers living and working on farmland near San Diego (several images published in 1982 in the book In the Fields); a photo essay of a Charro (rodeo) event near Riverside, California; and garment workers in downtown Los Angeles.

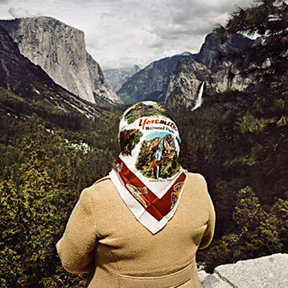
"Woman at Inspiration Point, 1980" (Minick's most well known photograph)

== Sightseer series and other photo projects ==
Minick's best known photo project, the "Sightseer" series, in which he photographed tourists visiting the National Parks and Monuments in the United States, began in 1979. While the first few images for this project were in black and white, the project soon became Minick's first experience working in color. The "Sightseer" images were first exhibited at the Grapestake Gallery in San Francisco in 1981 and were reviewed by Thomas Albright in the San Francisco Chronicle. Images from this series were also included in the hardcover book and major traveling exhibition American Photographers and the National Parks, sponsored by the National Parks Foundation. In 1986, photographs from this series were included in the San Francisco Museum of Modern Art traveling exhibition and hardcover book Photography in California: 1945-1980. Minick's best known image from the "Sightseer" series, "Woman at Inspiration Point, 1980", was also included in the Oakland Museum of California 1989 exhibition Picturing California, which traveled nationally, and this same image was also featured on the cover of the catalogue for the exhibition. In the year 2000, the Los Angeles County Museum of Art also featured the same image on billboards and as banners on light posts around Los Angeles advertising their exhibition Made in California.

In 1981, Minick was commissioned to photograph the newly renovated Paramount Theatre in Oakland, California, the resulting series of color photographs becoming a book titled The Oakland Paramount.

== Publications ==
- Delta West. Scrimshaw, 1969. With Dave Bohn
- Hills of Home. Scrimshaw, 1975. With Bob Minick and Leonard Sussman.
- The Oakland Paramount. Lancaster-Miller, 1982. With Susannah Harris Stone
- In The Fields. Harvest, 1982. With Ken Light, Reesa Tansey, Paul Schuster Taylor and Anne Loftis.
