= J. Lancaster & Son =

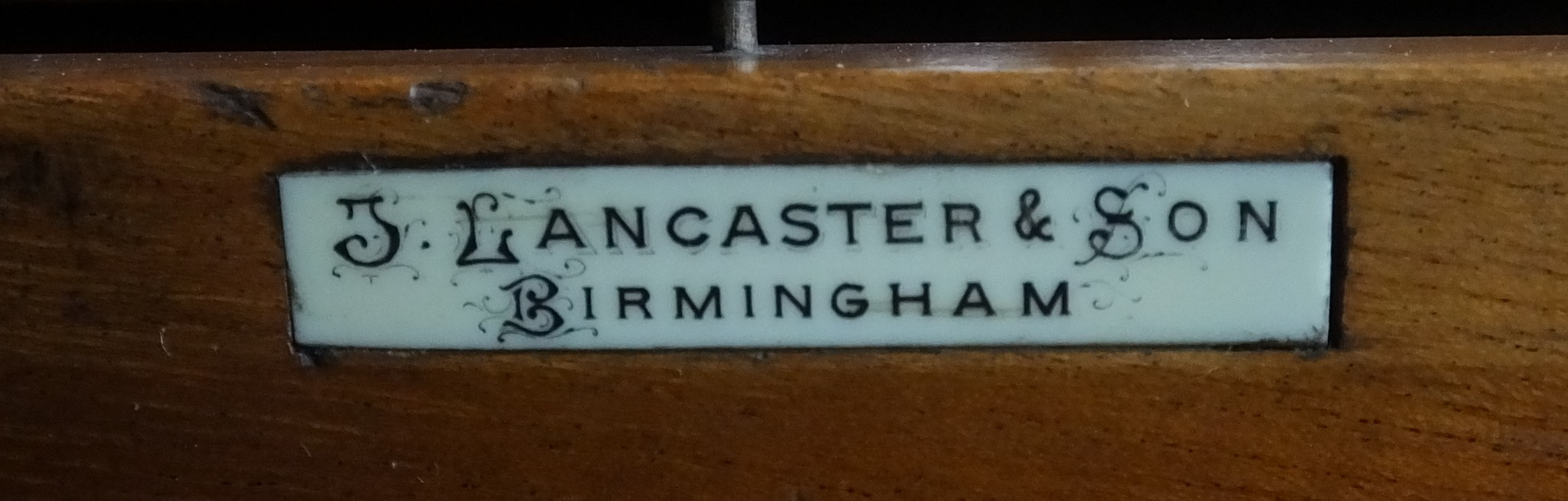
- J. Lancaster & Son name plate.
- Industry: Photography
- Founded: 1835
- Defunct: 1955
- Fate: Dissolved
- Headquarters: Birmingham, England
- Owner: James Lancaster

J. Lancaster & Son was a photographic company, formed in Birmingham, England, in 1835 when James Lancaster started an optical firm for the manufacture of glasses, microscopes, and telescopes.

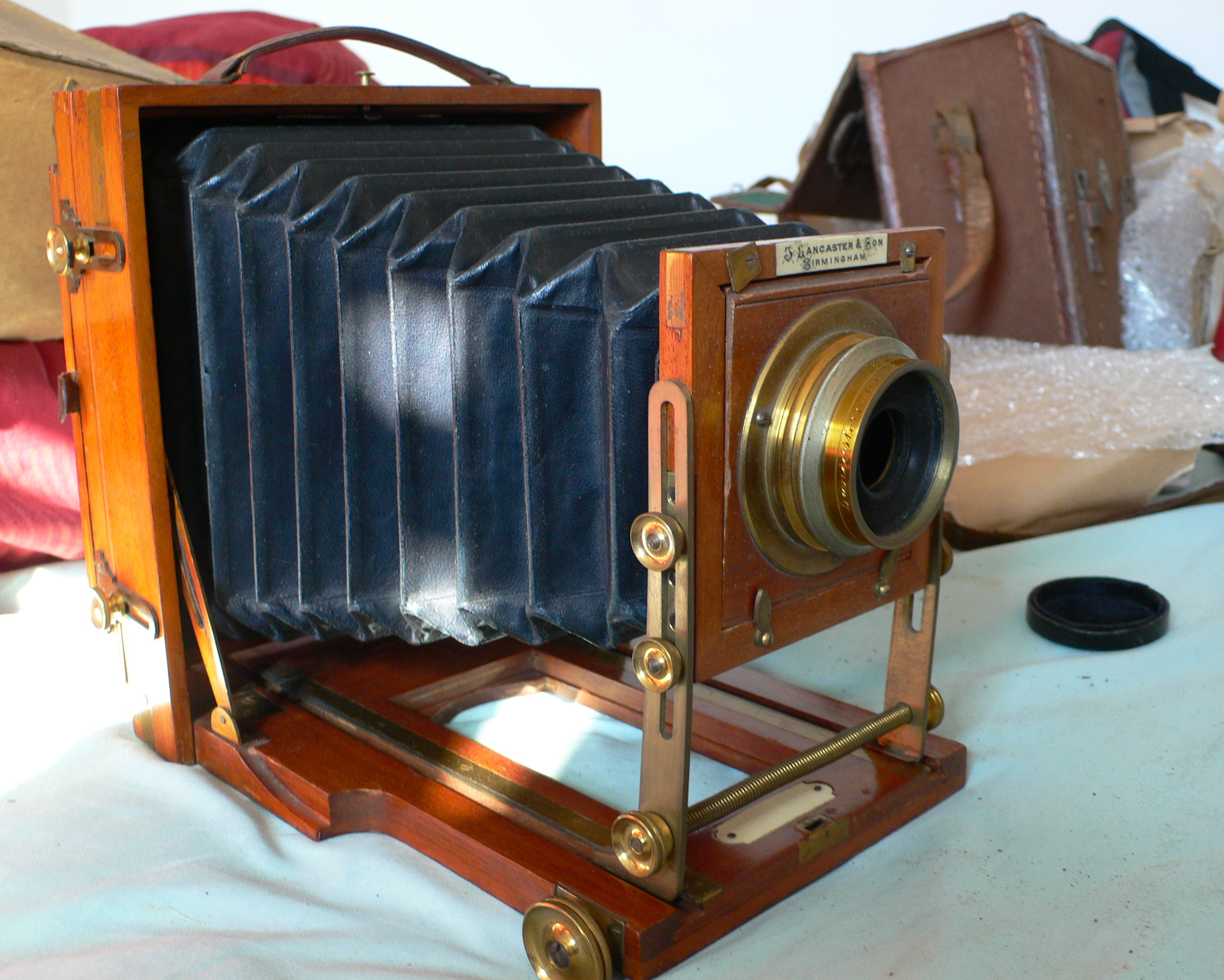
Lancaster View Camera from around 1898.

The company was an optician and camera maker, based in Irving Street, Birmingham. It was one of the world's major camera makers in 1898. It made wooden view cameras, among them several cameras for smaller plate formats. Lancaster made its own lenses and had patents for shutters. Other products were magic lanterns and photographic enlargers.

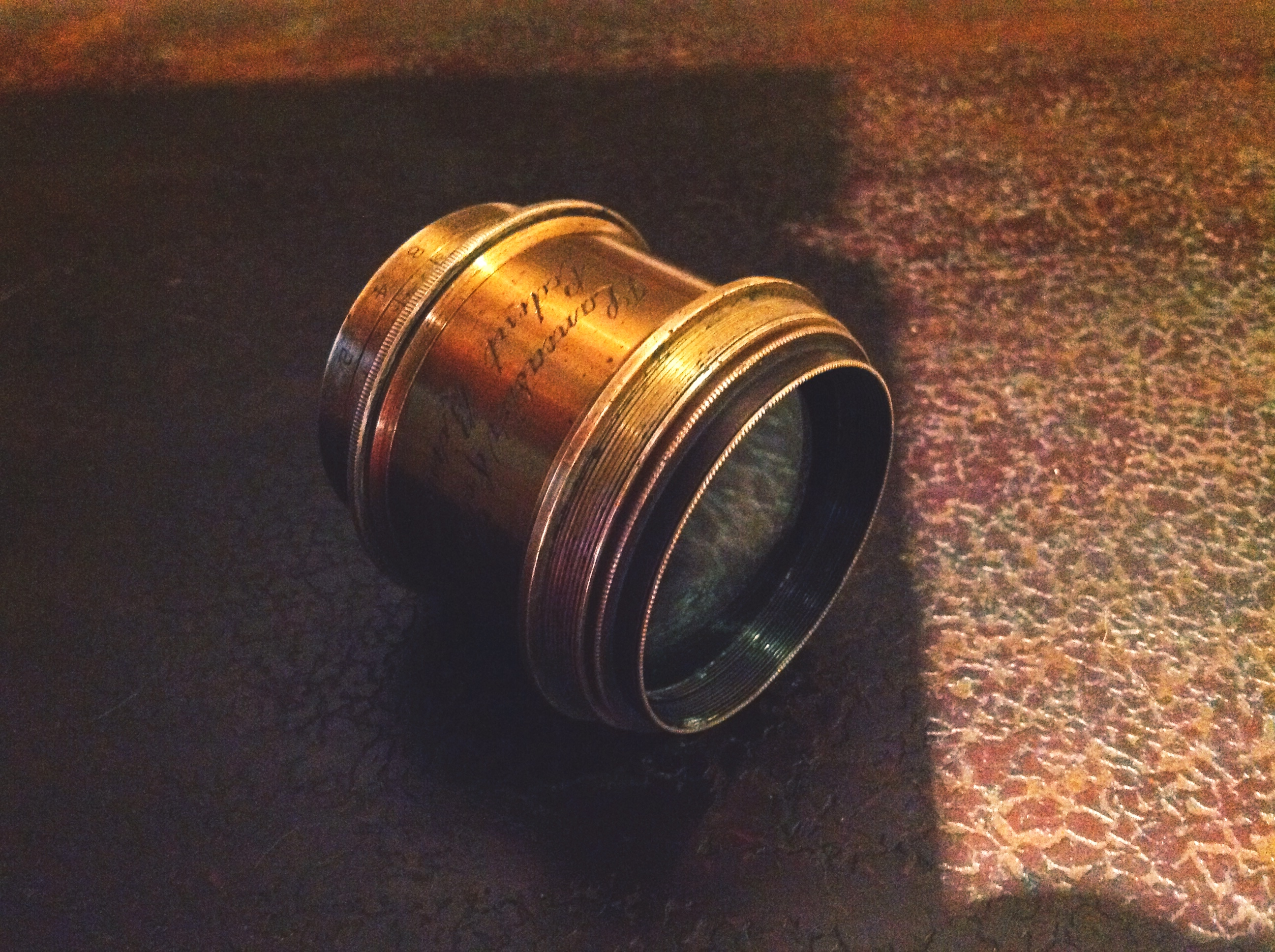
An achromatic landscape brass lens.

== History ==
James Lancaster founded the firm of James Lancaster in 1835 on Bull Street in Birmingham. It manufactured spectacles, telescopes and microscopes. It manufactured its wares in a series of small workshops. In 1853, it moved to 37 Colmore Row where it remained until 1907, though it retained the Bull Street property for manufacturing.

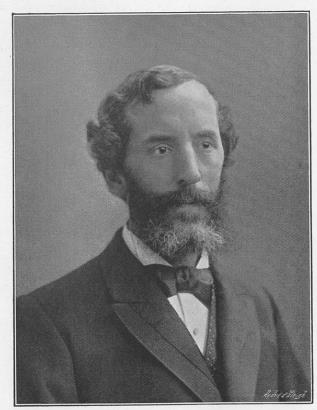
Councillor W J Lancaster JP - the picture was taken by a Birmingham photographer called J. W. Beaufort and published alongside a biography of Lancaster, in Handsworth magazine, in October 1894

In 1870, William James Lancaster, his son took over and in 1871 the name was changed to J. Lancaster & Son. William James refocused the company to include photographic products and popularising them with the public. In 1879 they were offering the Lancaster Pocket Camera, which took 4 ¼ in × 3¼ inch plates and a Gem camera taking multiple images called the Lancaster Carte Camera.

There is a reference in 1874 that Lancaster was producing a pocket camera, reviewed in the British Journal of Photography.

More models followed, Le Merveilleux, Le Meritoire and the Instantograph in 1882, and the pocket watch camera in 1886. In 1898 it claimed to be the world's largest camera manufacturer having sold over 200,000 cameras.

It became a limited company in 1905, becoming J. Lancaster & Son. Ltd and this is recorded on subsequent camera labels. W. J. Lancaster died in 1925 and the firm ceased trading in 1955.

== Products ==
- The 1/4-plate Instantograph was one of the better known.
- Le Merveilleux
- Le Meritoire
- Gem Apparatus of 1880, a camera with twelve lenses to shoot the same subject twelve times at once.
- Telescopic Patent Watch Camera in pocket watch format

== Gallery ==
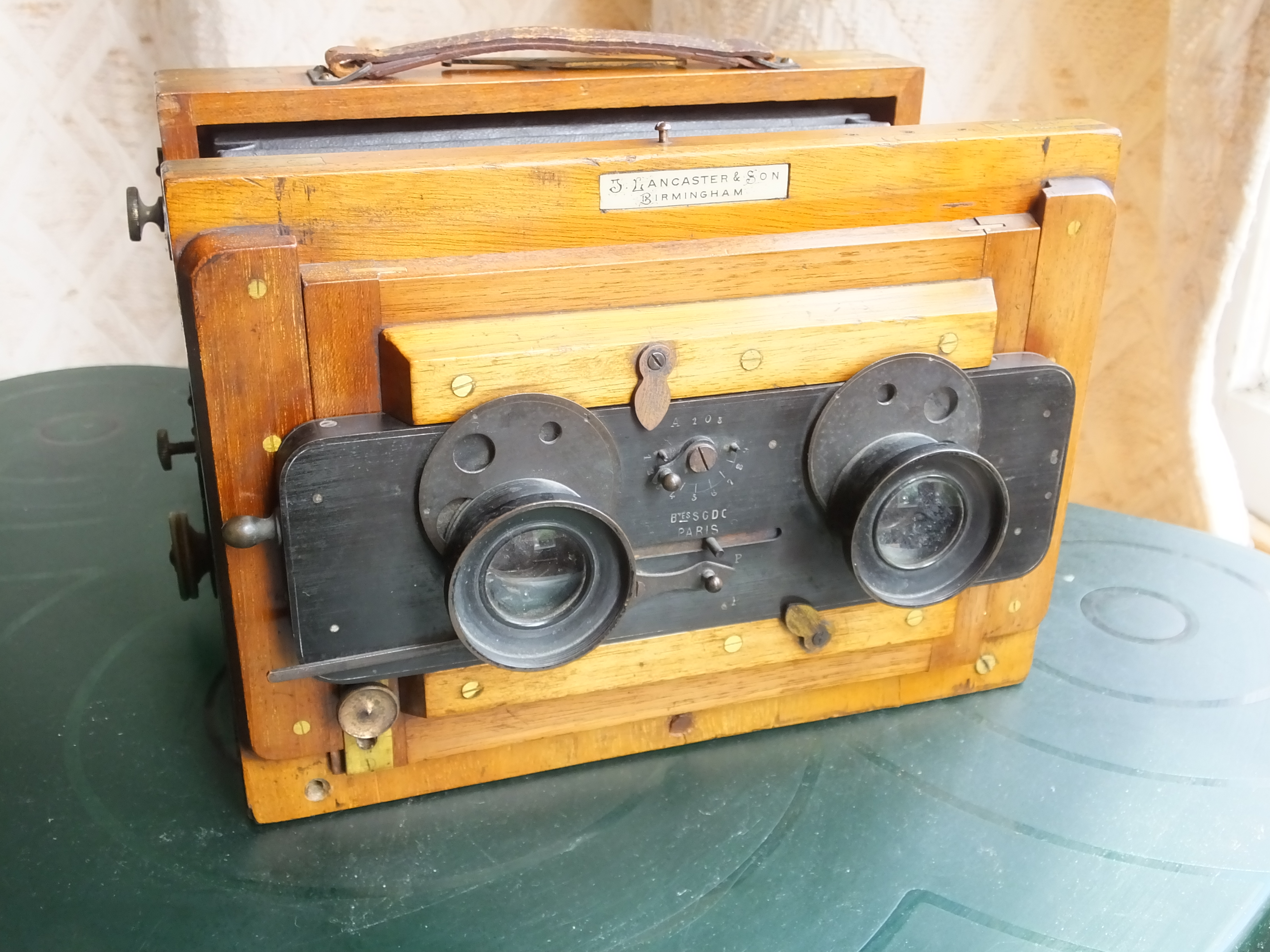
Model 7497.

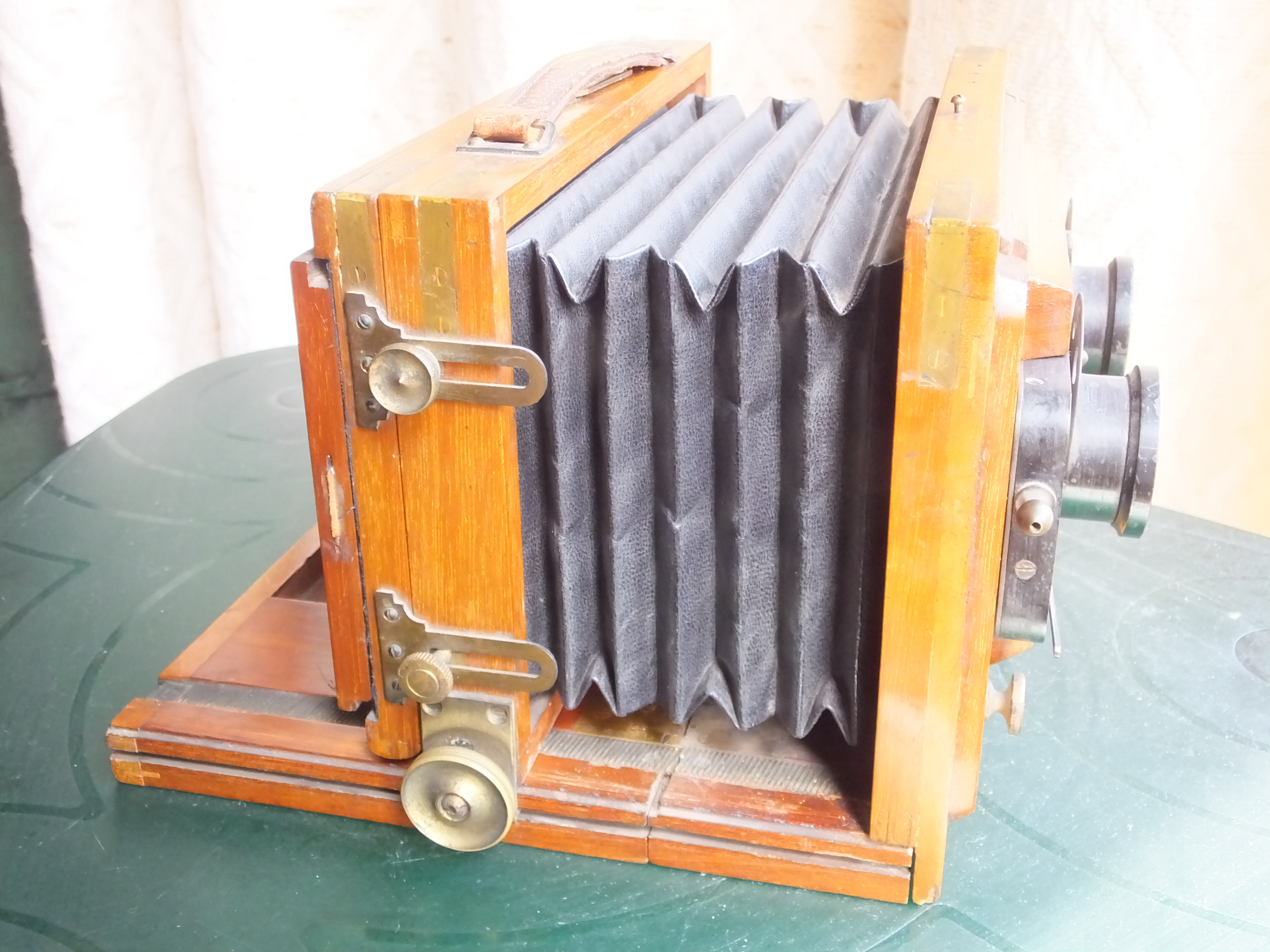
Model 7506.

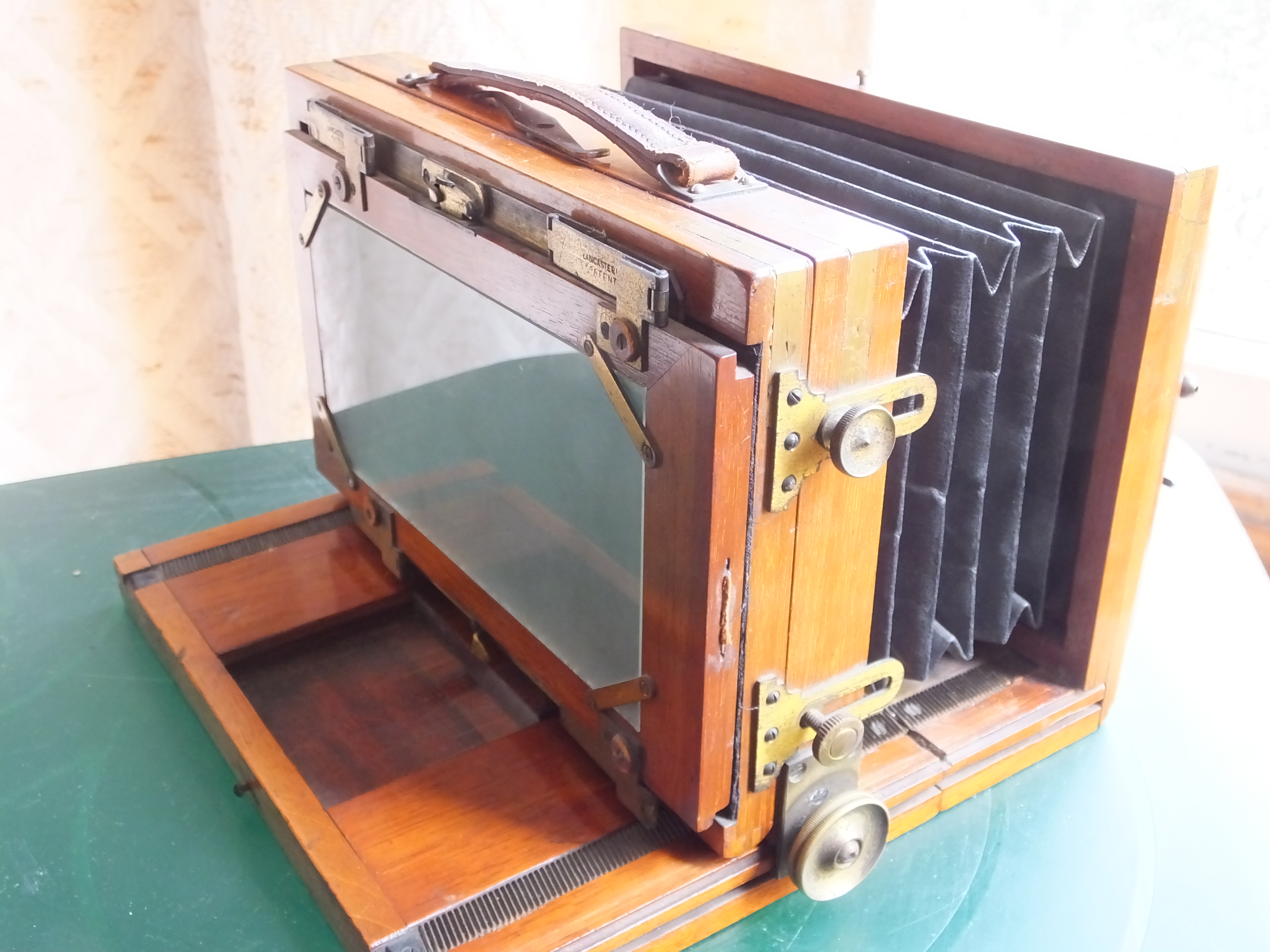
Model 7507.

== Bibliography ==
- "J Lancaster & Son". Graces Guide.
- "J. Lancaster & Son Ltd". History Librarium. Historic Camera.
- "Councillor W.J. Lancaster J.P." - biography, in Handsworth magazine
