= Richard Misrach =

American photographer (1949)

- Born: 1949 (age 76–77); Los Angeles, California, U.S.
- Known for: Photography
- Notable work: Desert Cantos, On the Beach
- Style: Large format color

Richard Misrach (born 1949) is an American photographer. He has photographed the deserts of the American West, and pursued projects that document the changes in the natural environment that have been wrought by various man-made factors such as urban sprawl, tourism, industrialization, floods, fires, petrochemical manufacturing, and the testing of explosives and nuclear weapons by the military. Curator Anne Wilkes Tucker writes that Misrach's practice has been "driven [by] issues of aesthetics, politics, ecology, and sociology." In a 2011 interview, Misrach noted: "My career, in a way, has been about navigating these two extremes - the political and the aesthetic."

Describing his philosophy, Tracey Taylor of The New York Times writes that "[Misrach's] images are for the historical record, not reportage." David Littlejohn of The Wall Street Journal called Misrach "the most interesting and original photographer of his generation." Littlejohn noted Misrach's work in a large scale, color format that defied the prior expectations of fine art photography.

== Early life and education ==
Misrach was born in 1949 in Los Angeles, California. In 1967 he left Los Angeles for the University of California, Berkeley, where he obtained a B.A. in Psychology after briefly pursuing a degree in Mathematics. While on campus he was confronted with the anti-war riots and began photographing the events around him; he also learned the rudiments of photography with Paul Herzoff, Roger Minick, and Steve Fitch at the ASUC Berkeley Studio.

== Early work ==
Misrach's first major photography project, completed in 1974, depicted homeless residents of Telegraph Avenue in Berkeley, California. This suite of photographs was shown at the International Center of Photography and published as a book, Telegraph 3 AM, which won a Western Book Award in 1975.

Having hoped that Telegraph 3 AM would help improve life on the streets, Misrach was frustrated by the book's minimal impact and retreated to the deserts of Southern California, Arizona, and Baja California, where he took photographs devoid of human figures entirely. Working at night with a strobe that illuminated the landscape around him, he experimented with unusual printing techniques in the university darkroom and created richly hued, split-toned silver prints. A resulting 1979 book was published without a title or a single word of accompanying text besides nominal identifying information on the book's spine. In 1976 he traveled to Stonehenge to continue his split-toned night studies, and in 1978 he began working in color on journeys to Greece, Louisiana, and Hawaii.

== The Desert Cantos ==
As Misrach's longest-running and most ambitious project, the Desert Cantos, an ongoing series of photographs of deserts, may be considered the photographer's magnum opus. Begun in 1979 with a Deardorff 8×10" view camera, the series is ongoing and numbers 42 cantos as of 2022.

Misrach's use of the term "canto" was inspired in part by the cantos of Ezra Pound; in a 1989 article in Creative Camera, Gerry Badger elaborates:

The Italian term "canto" was used to denote that the vast enterprise has been broken down into individual thematic essays or "cantos," which together make up the whole work, or "song cycle." Some of these cantos consist of only a few images, while others run into hundreds. Some may be regarded as "documentary" in mode, some more metaphorical. Some may be considered aesthetic in intent, some "political" – though as an ambitious and intelligent photographer, aesthetics are never pursued at the expense of politics, or vice versa. Misrach's goal may be said to be a search for the photographic Holy Grail, to fuse reportage with poetry. To progress – as he put it – "from the descriptive and the informative to a metaphorical resolution."

A 2013 review in Architectural Digest compares Misrach's desert images to the work of "Carleton Watkins, Timothy O'Sullivan, and other 19th-century itinerant photographers," noting that while "sublimely beautiful, Misrach's prints are also imbued with disquieting undercurrents." Beginning with "The Terrain," in which images of apparently untouched wilderness are punctuated by human elements such as a lone telephone pole or a train, the Cantos include spectacles like the space shuttle landing ("The Event") and car racing ("The Salt Flats"), man-made fires and floods like the Salton Sea ("The Flood") and desert seas created by the damming of rivers, as well as color-field studies of empty skies ("The Skies"). Images of military training and testing sites feature extensively in the Cantos and the series' corresponding publications: "The War" resulted in the 1991 book Bravo 20: The Bombing of the American West, co-authored by Myriam Weisang Misrach, and nuclear testing was addressed in Violent Legacies, published in 1992. "The Pit" documented mass graves of dead animals in the Nevada desert while "Pictures of Paintings" focused on the representation of the western landscape in museums across the American West. "The Playboys" depicted issues of Playboy, discovered by the photographer at a military site, that had been used for target practice.

Badger suggests that Misrach's Cantos have an antecedent in the work of Depression-era documentary photographer Lewis Hine, writing that with the Cantos, Misrach

...has attempted a project of immense ambition – possibly one of the most ambitious in the history of the medium – compounded of many ideas, existing on different levels, and subject to profound shifts in subject and mood. He must be judged on the Desert Cantos as a totality, the sum rather than the individual parts... I regard the Desert Cantos as one of the most important photographic enterprises of the nineteen-eighties and nineties.

The Los Angeles Times quotes Misrach regarding the Cantos:

The desert ... may serve better as the backdrop for the problematic relationship between man and the environment. The human struggle, the successes ... both noble and foolish, are readily apparent in the desert. Symbols and relationships seem to arise that stand for the human condition itself.

=== Desert Canto XXXVIII: Premonitions (2009-2016) and Desert Canto XXXIX: The Writing On the Wall (2017-) ===
In one of the most recent Desert Cantos, Misrach examines a polarizing and anxious moment in American history, using both a large-format digital camera and his iPhone to document graffiti left on abandoned buildings and rock walls throughout Southern California and the greater Southwest. Desert Canto XXXVIII: Premonitions (2009-2016) suggests a disturbing and dystopian climate which "in hindsight...led to the Trump election" while Desert Canto XXXIX: The Writing On the Wall (2017-), photographed after the 2016 election, captures an "election-engendered dialogue in graffiti form."

=== Desert Canto LV: Art in the West ===
As part of Misrach‘s exploration of land art in the desert, he photographed Nancy Holt's Sun Tunnels in 1988. That work is part of a 2022 traveling exhibition, Nancy Holt/ Inside Outside, and was published in a Blind Spot monograph.

== The Oakland–Berkeley fire and Hurricane Katrina ==
In October 1991, a firestorm raged in the Oakland–Berkeley hills, killing 25 people, wounding 150 and destroying over 3,500 dwellings. This fire – one of the worst in California's history – happened a few miles from Misrach's studio and the photographer visited the site a few weeks later, taking hundreds of pictures. However, out of respect for the victims of the fire, he put the work away for two decades. "1991: The Oakland–Berkeley Fire Aftermath: Photographs by Richard Misrach," an exhibition of Misrach's photographs of the firestorm's aftermath, was finally shown for the first time concurrently by the Berkeley Art Museum and the Oakland Museum of California in 2011. These exhibits included handcrafted elegy books in which visitors shared their recollections, a video story booth for recording memories, and an open-microphone meetings. The collected responses from local residents, as well as the prints — sets of which Misrach donated to the museums — were kept in the collections.

To date, the majority of Misrach's large-format documentary images of New Orleans and the Gulf Coast taken immediately after Hurricane Katrina have not been shown, with the exception of Destroy this Memory, a book published five years after the disaster, consisting entirely of pocket-camera pictures of messages left on houses, cars, and trees by survivors of the hurricane. A Los Angeles Times review called the book "a raw testament, shot between October and December 2005, just after the waters began to recede but the emotions had certainly not. Without captions or a contextual introduction to detract from the potency of the photographs themselves, the book is a powerful document allowing survivors to speak eloquently for themselves — even in absentia." Proceeds from Destroy this Memory were donated to the Make It Right Foundation to help rebuild the city's Lower Ninth Ward. Complete sets of the photographs were also donated to five museums—the Museum of Modern Art, the National Gallery of Art, the New Orleans Museum of Art, the Houston Museum of Fine Arts and the San Francisco Museum of Modern Art.

== Golden Gate Bridge and Petrochemical America ==
When Misrach moved to a house in the Berkeley hills in 1997, he was inspired by the spectacle of weather and light surrounding the Golden Gate Bridge, which sat only seven miles from his front porch. For four years he photographed the bridge from the same location and with the same vantage point under different climate conditions.

Concurrently, Misrach was working in Louisiana, following a commission he received from the High Museum of Art in Atlanta. In 1998, he began documenting "Cancer Alley," a stretch along the Mississippi River between Baton Rouge and New Orleans that is home to over 135 manufacturing plants and refineries. The resulting images were exhibited as part of the "Picturing the South" series at the High Museum. He resumed photographing the area in 2010 and completed the series in 2012 with another exhibition at the High Museum, "Revisiting the South," and the publication of Petrochemical America, a book pairing Misrach's images with an "ecological atlas" by architect and Columbia University professor Kate Orff. Orff's writing and infographic-style work in the book articulate the complex industrial, economic, ecological, and historical problems that inevitably gave rise to the places featured in Misrach's photographs. A wall-sized image of contaminated wasteland depicting "Cancer Alley" was featured in "Picturing the South: 25 Years", on view at the High Museum of Art in 2021.

== On the Beach and On the Beach 2.0 ==
In January 2002, following an exploratory trip in November 2001, Misrach started his On the Beach project, consisting of serial photographs taken from the same building overlooking a beach in Hawaii. The project's title refers to the Cold War-era Nevil Shute book and subsequent 1959 sci-fi movie, On the Beach, in which survivors in Australia await an oncoming nuclear fallout. According to Smithsonian magazine, the series was "deeply influenced by the events of September 11, 2001;" the aerial perspectives of figures suspended in the ocean or on the beach reminded Misrach of news photographs of people falling from the twin towers.

The resulting photographs were very large: Smithsonian reports that "the largest measure six by ten feet and are so detailed you can read the headlines on a beachgoer's newspaper." The beach images "seem much more beautiful, almost in a way more soft than some of his other work," writes Sarah Greenough, photography curator at the National Gallery of Art: "After you look at them for a while, though, they are hardly soft at all. There really is something very ominous going on." Misrach also captured people in action – a man tossing a woman through the air or someone doing a headstand in the water – which was especially noteworthy given the time-consuming and cumbersome view camera used. The photographer has said that the work is of a piece with his usual focus on humanity and the environment, but "it is much more about our relationship to the bigger, sublime picture of things."

Misrach completed the series in 2005 and went on to publish a large-format book called On the Beach in 2007, voted by Photo District News readers as one of the most influential books of the decade.

Returning to the same beach while on vacation in late 2011 with a new digital camera, he began working at the same location but with a different intent and mood: the artist says he was becoming "more comfortable with metaphysical questions," and the subjects of his 2011 images appear at play and in harmony with nature. The title of the series, On the Beach 2.0, alludes to the fact that the photographs are grounded in their technological moment in time – as do the individual titles, which refer to the date and exact minute of each shot.

Conversely, reviewer Allegra Kirkland points out that parts of this body of work are the closest Misrach has come to traditional portraiture since Telegraph 3 AM. The use of a digital camera and a telephoto lens introduced a new degree of speed and proximity to the artist's shooting methods; although faces are often obscured by a towel or magazine, many of the images in On The Beach 2.0 might still be considered gestural portraits.

Kirkland writes: "The [On The Beach 2.0] series is about waiting and what happens when you do—the strange, small, secret moments that compose life... Ten years after the debut of the original project, Misrach seems to be affirming that man and nature do not always have to exist in opposition."

== Reverse photographs and iPhone images ==
Recently, as an homage to the end of the analog era, Misrach has created a number of reverse images, essentially presenting large prints in their negative form: "The colors are reversed when output as pigment prints, making the photographs chromatic negatives... With his new work, Misrach appears determined to renew that sense of unfamiliarity—to revive the idea that color is unreliable, artificial." (Art in America)

While making enormous large-scale prints, Misrach has also been experimenting with the relatively miniature, contemporary medium of cell phone photography; an exhibit of this work was shown in 2011, consisting entirely of small-scale color prints taken with an iPhone camera. Misrach "continues his examination of man's interaction with land and seascapes in these intimate and experimental images, [wherein] the artist revisits Bombay Beach, California, a flood zone where he [photographed] found objects and detritus – evidence of man's presence in the landscape. These compositions were also manipulated: positive becomes negative and objects are transformed in a reversed color spectrum."

In 2022, Notations, a large monograph of these experimental color reverse photographs was published by Radius Books.

== Border Cantos ==
Misrach's Border Cantos series comprises photographs of the border between the U.S. and Mexico taken since 2004, and most extensively since 2009. In 2012 he began a collaboration with composer Guillermo Galindo, who manufactures playable instruments from objects found along the border. Misrach and Galindo have recovered artifacts from the border zone including water bottles, clothing, back-packs, Border Patrol "drag" tires, spent shotgun shells, ladders, and sections of the border wall itself, all of which have been transformed by Galindo into instrumental sculptures. The pair have produced the book Border Cantos (Aperture, 2016) and a museum exhibition that traveled to the San Jose Museum of Art, the Amon Carter Museum of Art, Crystal Bridges Museum of American Art, and Pace/PaceMacGill Gallery in New York (2016-2017). Crystal Bridges Museum of American Art has since acquired a number of pieces for their permanent collection and they are now traveling these pieces in an exhibit they call Border Cantos | Sonic Border. This exhibit has been traveling since 2018 and has gone to over a dozen museums such as the Amarillo Museum of art, the Missoula Art Museum, the Westmoreland Museum of American Art and the Figge Art Museum.

== UCSF Nancy Friend Pritzker Psychiatry Building ==
In 2019, Misrach was commissioned to produce all the art for a new UCSF psychiatry building in San Francisco. Mining his own archive of photographs, he produced over 120 works for the building which opened in fall 2022.

== Alonzo King LINES Ballet ==
“Let Not Your Heart Be Troubled,” a collaboration between Alonzo King LINES Ballet, Grammy-winning singer Lisa Fisher and Misrach, had its world premiere in April 2023 in San Francisco before starting a traveling tour.

== CARGO ==
Begun during the Covid quarantine, exhibited at Pace New York and published in 2025 by Aperture with a text by Rebecca Solnit, CARGO captures the serenity of container ships anchored in the San Francisco Bay. As light, water and skies shimmer around the vessels, the series “finds beauty within repetition, reveling in the reexamination of the same subject.” As such, the work is also “an anesthetic relative of his earlier large scale Golden Gate Bridge” photographs. At the same time, the beauty of these ships “is inextricably linked to an ecological and political urgency.”

== Awards ==
Misrach's book Desert Cantos received the 1988 Infinity Award from the International Center for Photography, and his Bravo 20: The Bombing of the American West, co-authored with Myriam Weisang Misrach, was awarded the 1991 PEN Center West Award for a nonfiction book. His Katrina monograph Destroy This Memory won Best Photobook of the Year 2011 at PhotoEspaña.

He has received four National Endowment for the Arts Fellowships, a Guggenheim Fellowship, an International Center of Photography Infinity Award for a Publication, and the Distinguished Career in Photography Award from the Los Angeles Center for Photographic Studies. In 2002 he was given the Kulturpreis for Lifetime Achievement in Photography by the German Society for Photography, and in 2008 he received the Lucie Award for Outstanding Achievement in Fine Art Photography.

== Commissions ==
In 2010, Apple licensed Misrach's 2004 image Pyramid Lake (at Night) as the inaugural wallpaper for the first iPad. The opening credits of the 2014 HBO series True Detective featured a montage of images from Misrach's Petrochemical America.

In 2016, the AIGA selected Border Cantos for its "50 Books | 50 Covers" competition, a "survey of the best in book design represent[ing] perhaps the longest-standing legacy in American graphic design."

== Personal life ==
Misrach has been married since 1989 to writer Myriam Weisang and has a son, Jake, from his first marriage to Debra Bloomfield.

== Publications ==
- Telegraph 3 A.M.: The Street People of Telegraph Avenue, Berkeley, Cornucopia Press, Berkeley, CA, 1974
- (untitled photographic book), Grapestake Gallery, San Francisco, CA, 1979
- Desert Cantos, University of New Mexico Press, Santa Fe, NM, 1987 (first and second editions)
  - Desert Cantos (Japanese edition), Treville Corporation Ltd., 1987
  - Desert Cantos, University of New Mexico Press, Santa Fe, NM, 1988 (third edition)
- Richard Misrach: 1975-1987, Gallery Min, Tokyo. 1988
- Bravo 20: The Bombing of the American West (with Myriam Weisang Misrach), Johns Hopkins University Press, Baltimore, MD, 1990
- Violent Legacies: Three Cantos (with fiction by Susan Sontag), Aperture, New York City, 1992
  - Violent Legacies: Three Cantos (with fiction by Susan Sontag), Aperture, New York City, 1994 (softcover edition)
- Crimes and Splendors: The Desert Cantos of Richard Misrach, Museum of Fine Arts, Houston, TX, 1996
- Cantos del Desierto, Diputacion de Granada, Granada, Spain, 1999
- The Sky Book, Arena, Santa Fe, NM, 2000
- Richard Misrach: Golden Gate, Arena, Santa Fe, NM, 2001
  - Richard Misrach: Golden Gate, Aperture, New York City, 2005 (second edition)
  - Richard Misrach: Golden Gate, Aperture, New York City, 2013 (third edition)
- Pictures of Paintings, Blind Spot/Powerhouse, 2002
- Richard Misrach: Chronologies, Fraenkel Gallery, San Francisco, CA, 2005
- Richard Misrach: On The Beach, Aperture, New York City, 2007
- Destroy This Memory, Aperture, New York City, 2010
- 1991, Blind Spot/Powerhouse, 2011
- Petrochemical America (with Kate Orff), Aperture, New York City, 2012
  - Petrochemical America (with Kate Orff), Aperture, New York City, 2014 (paperback edition)
- 11.21.11 5:40pm, Fraenkel Gallery, San Francisco, CA, 2013
- iPhone Studies: Reverse Scrubs, Nazraeli Press (One Picture Book No. 82), Portland, OR, 2013
- Misrach, Nazraeli Press (Six by Six), Portland, OR, 2014
- Assignment No 2 (Michael Nelson with Richard Misrach and Hiroshi Sugimoto), TBW, Oakland, CA, 2014
- The Mysterious Opacity of Other Beings, Aperture, New York City, 2015
- Photographers' References: Richard Misrach, Photographers' References, Paris, France, 2016
- Border Cantos by Richard Misrach and Guillermo Galindo; with an introduction and texts by Josh Kun. Aperture, New York City, 2016
- Richard Misrach On Landscape and Meaning, Aperture, New York, 2021
- Richard Misrach: Notations, Radius, 2022
- Blind Spot Folios 001: Nancy Holt & Richard Misrach, Blind Spot, New York, 2022
- CARGO (text by Rebecca Solnit), Aperture, New York, 2025

=== Selected anthologies and documentaries ===
- New American Photography, Kathleen Gauss, Los Angeles County Museum of Art, 1985
- American Independents: Eighteen Color Photographers, ed. Sally Eauclaire. New York: Abbeville, 1987. ISBN 0-89659-666-4.
- American Visionaries: Selections from the Whitney Museum of American Art, The Whitney Museum of American Art, Harry N. Abrams, 2002
- Visions from America: Photographs from the Whitney Museum of American Art, 1940-2001, The Whitney Museum of American Art, Prestel, 2002
- Artbound | No Trespassing: A Survey of environmental art, PBS, summer 2020
- Art21: Borderlands, Art in the Twenty-First Century, Fall 2020
- Art21: Richard Misrach: Never the Same, Spring 2022

== Exhibitions ==
Misrach was part of the Mirrors and Windows exhibit, at the Museum of Modern Art in 1978. A solo show followed at the Musee d'Art Moderne, Beaubourg Center, Paris. He has been part of two Whitney Biennials, in 1981 and again in 1991. A major mid-career survey was organized by the Houston Museum of Fine Arts in 1996 and toured the United States; a smaller version appeared in Madrid and Bilbao, Spain. Beginning in 2007, the exhibit On the Beach traveled to museums nationwide, including the Art Institute of Chicago, the High Museum of Art in Atlanta, and the National Gallery of Art. In 2012/13, Misrach's Cancer Alley work was on view at the High Museum of Art and the Cantor Center at Stanford University, and was part of a traveling exhibition with Kate Orff. A selection of Misrach's series Telegraph 3AM, the entirety of which is held in MoMA's collection, was on view as part of the exhibition Living in the City, in 2021/22.

== Collections ==
Misrach's work is held in the following public collections:

- Centre Pompidou: 5 prints (as of October 2022)
- Amon Carter Museum of American Art:12 prints (as of October 2022)
- Los Angeles County Museum of Art:21 prints (as of October 2022)
- Metropolitan Museum of Art:7 prints (as of April 2019)
- Museum of Fine Arts, Houston:150 prints (as of October 2022)
- Museum of Modern Art, New York:101 prints (as of October 2022)
- National Gallery of Art:151 prints (as of October 2022)
- Art Institute of Chicago:31 prints (as of October 2022)
- Whitney Museum of American Art:18 prints (as of April 2019)
- San Francisco Museum of Modern Art:85 prints (as of October 2022)
- Crystal Bridges Museum of American Art:4 prints (as of October 2022)
- North Carolina Museum of Art: 1 print (as of May 2023)
