= Cloyd Jonathan Sweigert =

American cartoonist

- Born: February 20, 1897; Santa Clara Valley, California, U.S.
- Died: February 20, 1973 (aged 76); Palo Alto, California, U.S.
- Other names: C.J. Sweigert, CJ Sweigert
- Occupation(s): editorial cartoonist, painter

Cloyd Jonathan "C.J." Sweigert (February 20, 1897– February 20, 1973) was an American political cartoonist and fine art painter, based in Palo Alto, California.

== About ==
Sweigert was born on February 20, 1897, on a farm in the Santa Clara Valley near San Jose, his family were early pioneers of the area. He attended University of California, Berkeley (class of 1918) where he studied agriculture and University of California, Davis, however he was a self-taught painter. He served in the United States Army during World War I.

Sweigert joined the San Francisco Chronicle newspaper in 1932, working as a political cartoonist until his retirement in 1955. Sweigert's cartoon after the death of Winston Churchill was widely published in England. He had been a member of the Palo Alto Art Club (now known as the Pacific Art League), and a member of the Bohemian Club in San Francisco.

In 1951 and 1952, he was awarded the Freedoms Foundation Medal in cartooning. In 1953, he was awarded the Christopher Medal for "best cartoon of the year".

He lived at a home on 1365 Forest Avenue in Palo Alto, from 1941 until his death in 1973. Sweigert died on this 76th birthday (February 20, 1973) in his home, after a battle with emphysema. He was buried in Oak Hill Memorial Park.

== See also ==
- List of people from Palo Alto
