= John Edward Walker =

British-born American painter and educator

- Born: 1880; Wales
- Died: 1940
- Other names: J. Edward Walker
- Occupation: painter
- Years active: 1913–1940
- Movement: California Impressionism

John Edward Walker, he often signed work as J. Edward Walker (1880–1940) was a British-born, American painter and educator, known for his California Impressionist paintings. He was active in Northern California and Los Angeles between 1913 until 1936. The subject of his work was often seascapes, floral still life paintings and landscapes.

He taught art classes from 1913 until 1916 at the Carmel Arts and Crafts Club, in Los Altos in the 1920s and Berkeley in 1932.

== About ==
He was born in Wales in 1880 and studied at Lambeth School of Art and Hammersmith School of Art, with Edward Reginald Frampton and Harry Windsor-Fry. Walker immigrated to the United States in 1911, and moved to Northern California by 1913. Initially he settled in Carmel-by-the-Sea, painting and teaching art lessons. In 1914, The New York Times newspaper named Williamson one of a few “notable” artists of Carmel.

In the early 1920s Walker moved to Los Altos, California and taught art, became active with the Palo Alto Art Club (now known as Pacific Art League), and exhibited work at Stanford University. He also exhibited at the California League of Fine Arts and served on the hanging committee in 1925.

In the early 1930s he moved and lived at 2233 Ellsworth Street in Berkeley, California and offered art classes from his home, one of the students included Sargent Johnson.
