= Harry Windsor-Fry =

British painter and arts educator (1862–1947)

Harry Windsor-Fry (1862–1947) also known simply as Windsor Fry, was a British painter and educator, active 1884 to 1893.

== Biography ==
He was born in 1862 in Torquay, a seaside town in Devon, England. Windsor-Fry attended St John's Wood School of Art in London. He was a member of the Royal Society of British Artists (RBA), elected in 1895. He was married to Gladys Windsor–Fry (née Hardy-Syms), she was an author and lecturer of embroidery and design at London College of Communication. Windsor-Fry's work is included in permanent collection the Walker Art Gallery in Liverpool.

He taught art classes in the ladies division at Crystal Palace Company's School of Art. He and his wife also offered private art lessons. Student's of Windsor–Fry included John Edward Walker, amongst others.
