= Guillermo Galindo =

Mexican composer, performer and artist

- Born: Mexico City
- Education: Escuela Nacional de Musica (BA); Berklee College of Music (BA); Mills College (MA)
- Occupations: Musician; Composer; Artist

Guillermo Galindo is a Mexican composer, performer, and artist.

== Early life ==
Composer Guillermo Galindo was born in Mexico City. As a young adult, he was trained in musical composition at the Escuela Nacional de Musica in Mexico City, while completing a BA in graphic design. He then attended Berklee College of Music, where he completed a film scoring and composition BA and Mills College in Oakland, California, where he received an MA in composition and electronic music. He would later collaborate with Chris Brown on the Transmission Series, an interactive performance and installation using homemade, low-powered FM radio transmitters.

== Music and art career ==
He began his career writing more traditional Western classical music. In 1997, he wrote Ome Acatl, a symphony on based on the proportions and symbolism of the Aztec calendars, for the OFUNAM orchestra. His work Trade Routes was performed by the Oakland East Bay Symphony in 2005, taking inspiration from the streets of Oakland, California.

In 2006, began composing experimental music. According to Art in America, Galindo also began, “building his own instruments, performing compositions on them himself or improvising with them,” including audience participation in his pieces. The publication stated further that in created his instruments, he “redefines the borders set by musical convention … [and] listens to found objects and, in effect, lets them speak as they will.” Inspiration for compositions he has written for these inventions have included Native American and Mesoamerican cultures. In 2014 his work Blood Bolero commissioned by the Paul Dresher ensemble and soprano Amy X Neuburg premiered at the Zellerbach Playhouse at Berkeley. His work Remote Control was commissioned by the Kronos Fifty for the Future Composers project. He also composed Sonic Re-Activation: Unearthing Public Square’s Forgotten Pasts while serving as a visiting artist-in-residence at Vanderbilt’s University Center for Latin American Studies and the Department of Art. Among his instruments is the "Angel Exterminador/Exterminating Angel", which is a gong made from a heavy, rusty, discarded sheet of twisted metal that resembles a set of angel wings, which he has played during performances at locations including Pace/MacGill Gallery in New York, Amon Carter Museum of American Art and Schrin Kunsthtalle in Germany. The "Angel Exterminador/Exterminating Angel" is now part of the permanent collection at the National Gallery, Washington, DC.

His version of John Cage's chance score Variations II for Mariachi Band, was performed at the San Francisco Museum of Modern Art on 2012, at the de Young Museum and at the San Francisco Conservatory on 2013.

In 2016 his instruments were first exhibited at the San Jose Museum of Art, in a collaboration with photographer Richard Misrach, an exhibition that also traveled to The Cantor Museum, Stanford, California (2021), The High Line, New York, (2021), Westmorland Museum, PA (2021), The Institute for Contemporary Art, Boston (2019), Cornell Fine Are Museum, Florida (2019), Pace Gallery, New York (2017) and the San Jose Museum of Art (2016)., the Crystal Bridges Museum of American Art, Bentonville, Arkansas and the Pace/MacGill Gallery in New York. The exhibitions paired Misrach’s own photographs, with Galindo’s instruments and sound installations by Galindo. A photographic book by the two entitled Border Cantos was published by Aperture that year as well, which is also the name of a set of his ensemble pieces. In 2016, he performed with his instruments at the Utah Museum of Fine Arts. He also produces graphic scores, which are sometimes displayed during his performances on mediums like nylon flags. Later, the two developed an exhibition of his instruments have also been displayed at the Tang Teaching Museum and Art Gallery made from objects left behind by immigrants making US-Mexico border crossings. Others were derived from found objects he discovered in Germany and Greece. During his exhibition there, Galindo also performed his piece Sonic Borders III. His pieces have also been exhibited in Berlin, Germany, including his first device, the MAIZ-Cybertotemic sonic device, which he invented in 2006. In 2019, his instruments were exhibited at the Cornell Fine Arts Museum, where he also performed his music. He has also exhibited at the documenta 14 biennial and Pacific Standard Time.

== Teaching career ==
Galindo has served as a senior adjunct professor at the California College of the Arts.

Mohr Visiting Artist at Stanford University

Thomas P. Johnson Distinguished Visiting Scholar 2019, Rollins Cornell Arts Museum
