= Sarah Wallis =

Settler in California and suffragist

- Born: Sarah Armstrong; 1825; Ohio, US
- Died: 1905 (aged 79–80); Los Gatos, California, US
- Other names: Sarah Armstrong Montgomery Green Wallis, Sarah Green, Sarah Armstrong Wallis
- Known for: The first President of the California Woman Suffrage Educational Association
- Spouse(s): Allen Montgomery, Talbot Henry Green (also known as Paul Geddes), Joseph Wallis

Sarah Wallis, also known as Sarah Armstrong Montgomery Green Wallis (1825–1905) was an early Anglophone settler in California and first President of the California Woman Suffrage Educational Association.

== Early life ==
She was born Sarah Armstrong in southern Ohio in 1825. Her family later settled in Missouri in 1839 where her father died in 1842.

She became a hired girl for John B. Townsend. She married Allen Montgomery and joined the Stephens-Townsend-Murphy Party which traveled to California over what was to become known as Donner Pass in 1844. They settled near Sutter's Fort where she learned to read and write but eventually moved to San Francisco. In 1847 her husband, Allen Montgomery, went to Hawaii where he was believed to have died.

== San Francisco ==
In 1849 she married Talbot H. Green, a businessman associated with Thomas O. Larkin and a rising politician in San Francisco. In 1851 a local newspaper reported that Talbot Green was in fact Paul Geddes, a married man wanted for bank fraud in Pennsylvania. Talbot left supposedly to return to Pennsylvania to clear his name but he did not return to California. (Still, Green Street, in San Francisco remains named for him, as he was a friend of the influential William Davis Merry Howard.) Sarah had had a son by him and in 1854 divorced him; he made over some property for her and his son which made her relatively well off.

== Sarah Wallis Mayfield farm ==
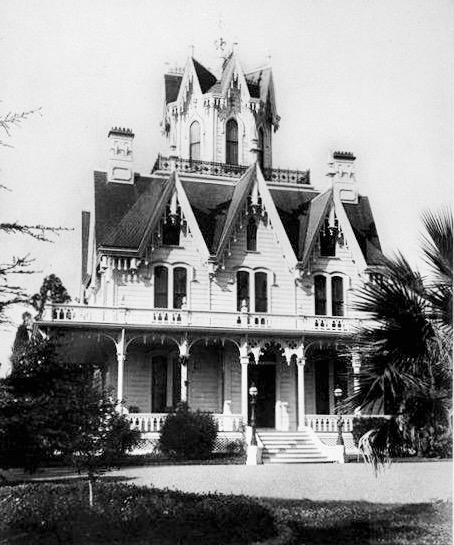
Wallis house on Mayfield Farm

Later the same year 1854, Sarah married Joseph Wallis, a lawyer and later state senator. Her son by Green was adopted by her new husband and took the name Talbot H. Wallis; he was later to become the tenth California State Librarian.

In 1856 she acquired the title to Mayfield Farm, 250 acres, in what is now southern Palo Alto and she and her husband settled there, built a large home, and had several more children. She invested in the San Francisco and San Jose Railroad and persuaded them to have a station (opened 1863, now the California Avenue station in Palo Alto) in the then town of Mayfield.

== Woman Suffrage movement ==
Though wealthy in her own right, after her marriage to Joseph Wallis it was legally in his name due to the law governing married women's property at the time; a law she lobbied to change. Both became staunch supporters of women's suffrage hosting meetings at her farm including one for Elizabeth Cady Stanton when she toured the west. In 1873 the California State Woman Suffrage Educational Association was founded with Sarah Wallis as president. She lobbied successfully for women to practice law in the California court system and that women could attend the California state college.

== Death and legacy ==
In 1875, California had an economic depression which forced her to sell Mayfield Farm and move to a smaller holding in Mayfield, the town. This in turn she lost after her husband's death in 1898. She moved in with her eldest son in Los Gatos and died there in 1905. She is buried in Union Cemetery, Redwood City.

Sarah Wallis park at the site of her second home in Palo Alto is named for her and the California Registered Historical Landmark #969 marks the site of her first home in Palo Alto, the Sarah Wallis Mayfield Farm. In 1986, the City of Palo Alto, Women's Heritage Museum of Palo Alto, and California State Department of Parks and Recreation added a memorial plaque at the site of the Sarah Wallis Mayfield Farm.

In Palo Alto there is a street named Wallis Court, across from Alta Mesa Cemetery.

== See also ==
- California Historical Landmarks in Santa Clara County, California
- List of people from Palo Alto
