= Talbot H. Green =

American businessman and politician (1810–1889)

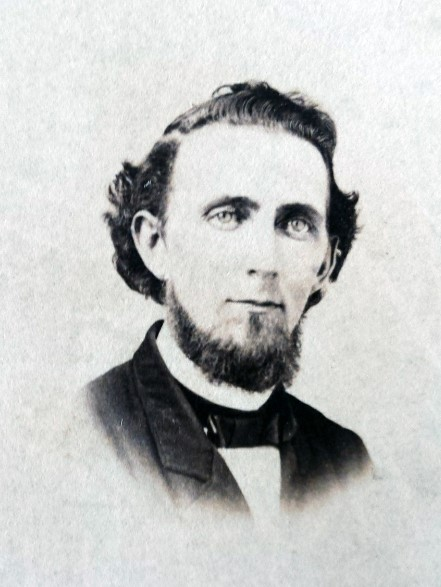
- Talbot H. Green (Paul Geddes) in Pennsylvania in 1860s (Note: The picture was posted by Rob Wagner. Paul Geddes was his three-times great uncle. It's part of Rob Leicester Wagner Collection)

Member of the San Francisco District Legislative Assembly
- In office February 1849 – August 1849

Member of the San Francisco Common Council
- In office August 1849 – May 1850

Personal details
- Born: Paul Geddes; August 11, 1810 Lewisburg, Pennsylvania, U.S.
- Died: July 2, 1889 (aged 78) Lewisburg, Pennsylvania, U.S.
- Party: Democratic
- Spouses: Henrietta Fredrick (m. 1832) Sarah Armstrong Montgomery (m. 1849; div. 1854)
- Children: 5
- Occupation: Merchant, clerk, politician

Talbot H. Green (born Paul Geddes; August 11, 1810 – July 2, 1889) was an American merchant and politician during the mid-19th century, who was exposed as Paul Geddes, an absconder and embezzler of funds from a Philadelphia bank. Born in Pennsylvania to an influential family of Scottish descent, Geddes initially worked in merchandising and engineering. His early career in Philadelphia ended abruptly after financial mismanagement and embezzlement led him to leave his wife and four children, flee westward, and adopt the alias Talbot H. Green.

In 1841, Green joined the Bartleson–Bidwell Party, a pioneering group of emigrants heading to California. Known for his friendly demeanor and leadership skills, he quickly established himself in the Californian business community. Green worked closely with Thomas O. Larkin, a prominent merchant in Monterey, and became a key figure in Larkin's mercantile operations.

Green's influence extended beyond business; he played an active role in California's early political and social life. He was a founding member of the Society of California Pioneers, served on San Francisco's first city council, and participated in significant land transactions. His contributions during the U.S. military conquest of California included supplying goods to American forces.

In 1851, rumors of Green's true identity as Paul Geddes surfaced, leading to his departure from California. He relocated to Texas and later worked as a clerk for the secretary of the United States Senate. Green spent his final years in Lewisburg, Pennsylvania, where he lived quietly until his death in 1889, respected by his community but marked by his earlier misdeeds.

== Early life and career ==
Paul Geddes was born on August 11, 1810. The Geddes family, of Scottish origin, traces its descent from Paul Geddes, born in Scotland between 1660 and 1670. The earlier Paul Geddes resided for a time in Ireland, near Randallstown, County Antrim, where his son James was born in 1704. James Geddes, his wife Margaret Muir, and their three sons, Paul, William, and Samuel, emigrated to America in August 1752, settling in what is now Dauphin County, Pennsylvania. James's sons became prominent locally, with at least one active in the American Revolution. Samuel Geddes, the youngest son, died in 1788, leaving four children. His second child, James Geddes (1781–1867), was the father of Paul Geddes, later known as Talbot H. Green. James Geddes married his cousin, Mary Geddes (1781–1874), on February 12, 1807, and lived in Lewisburg, Pennsylvania, where he was known for his character and integrity, serving as treasurer of a corporation for over forty years. He and his wife were Presbyterians and raised their three children, Paul, Margaret, and James, in this faith.

Paul left school early to work in a store for four years and later worked as an assistant engineer on the canal for two years. His father then provided him with $3,000 (Note: Equivalent to $108,120 in 2024) to start a merchandising business. They eventually bought another store in a neighboring town. On February 21, 1832, Paul Geddes was married to Henrietta Fredrick. After their marriage, Paul Geddes and his wife moved to a neighboring town where they established a new branch store. In this town, Geddes took on another business partner and was known as a respected and trusted businessman.

== Embezzlement ==
In the spring of 1840, Paul Geddes traveled to Philadelphia to buy goods and had a large quantity of wheat consigned to a trading house there. He withdrew $3,000 on account of the wheat but lost the money after a night of drinking. That afternoon, the cashier of the Farmers & Merchants Bank of Philadelphia asked him to carry $105,000 (Note: Equivalent to $3,784,200 in 2024) to the Northumberland bank. Green committed a fraud and stole the money. There is no official record of the exact amount of money Green stole. The incident was described by Green in his letter to Thomas O. Larkin:

... They got a carpet bag and put up 105,000$ in it in my presence and sent a porter with me to the hotel. I put it in my trunk and went out. On my return I found that I had been robbed of my money. I was under the excitement of liquor (no excuse) and was, in fact, not myself. I opened the carpet bag and took out nearly 8000$ (Note: Equivalent to $288,320 in 2024) and done the parcel up again. I then went to bed. In the morning [...] I then took the carpet bag to a merchant and told him what it contained and wished him to keep it until next day. The next day I went and paid a good many of my debts with the money and sent some 3000$ to my partner to pay notes we owed in the bank; and that night I left Philadelphia with 375$ determined that my people should never hear of me again. I went West and fell in with the emigration for California ... [sic]

Paul Geddes left Pennsylvania, abandoning his wife and four children. He traveled to New Orleans by ship from New York City. From New Orleans, he continued his journey by steamboat up the Mississippi River.

== Escape to the West ==
On board the boat Geddes met an Englishman, Talbot H. Green, who fell ill and died. In gratitude for Geddes's care, the Englishman left him his name and some papers, which he believed might be valuable in the future. Geddes took the name Talbot H. Green and kept the papers. Green continued from St. Louis up the Missouri River until he reached Westport, Missouri, which served as a departure point for the western plains.

In 1841, Green joined the Bartleson–Bidwell Party, a group of emigrants heading to California. The group gathered near the Kansas River in the spring, with Green, who was in his early thirties at the time. Known for his friendly and cultured demeanor, Green, "of evident culture and very pleasant address," quickly became well-liked by his fellow travelers. On May 18, during a meeting to organize the party, he was chosen to lead the gathering, highlighting his early leadership within the group.

Although Green initially held a prominent role, his influence did not continue during the rest of the journey. As the group moved westward, Green traveled as a regular member of the party. He joined the mess of John Bartleson, the party's captain, along with Charles Hopper, a well-known bear hunter; Gwynn Patton; Nicholas Dawson; and Grove C. Cook, a young man known for his likable but unruly nature, with whom Green developed a close friendship.

Green carried a case of medicines and earned the title of "doctor" by attending to the sick. He did not stand out from his companions during the journey, and mentions of him by chroniclers are due to his later notoriety rather than his actions on the trek. His fellow travelers later emphasized his presence, influenced by his future reputation.

Nicholas Dawson noted that Green's most valued possession was a quantity of lead. On the western slope of the Sierra Nevada range, the load became too heavy for the pack animal, so Green and Grove Cook hid the lead in a gulch. After reaching John Marsh's ranch near Mount Diablo, Green hired an Indian guide and, with Cook, retrieved the hidden pack. A year later in Monterey, Dawson met Green again, now wealthy with plenty of cash. Dawson was surprised by Green's sudden wealth, suggesting that the "lead" was actually a more precious metal.

== In California ==
=== Business establishment in Monterey ===
Green quickly established himself in California's business and social circles. Using John Marsh's bond, dated November 13, 1841, as security for his good behavior, Green moved to Monterey and began working for Thomas O. Larkin, the town's largest merchant, as a clerk and agent. Green soon earned the confidence of his new employer, and by the summer of 1842, he was sent out into the countryside to sell merchandise and conduct general trading. In July of that year, he wrote back to Larkin from Gilroy's rancho, reporting on his business activities. He mentioned, "I find some difficulty in getting along, on account of not speaking the language." A few days later, he wrote again, urging Larkin to come in person as many of the rancheros "would trade with you that won't with me." (Note: Dawson says that it was in this year or the next that Green set up a store of his own "at a ranch near the redwoods." It is probable, however, that this venture was connected with his activities as Larkin's agent.)

Continued trading helped Green become familiar with Californian customs, and his genial personality and open-hearted manners made him very successful in business. Larkin had so much confidence in him that, in May of the next year, he put Green in charge of all the goods in his Monterey store and warehouse, worth a total of $4,292. Green was to manage Larkin's Monterey business for a year, collecting debts, conducting trade, and overseeing his interests. For these services, he was to receive $400 and five percent of the profits. Later that month, Larkin gave Green $2,500 in cash to take to Los Angeles, where he was to collect a debt of $500 and offer the total amount to the Governor of the province as a loan. In November 1843, Larkin showed even more trust in Green's honesty and ability by putting him in charge of all his "outdoor business" when he left for a voyage to Mazatlan. This included overseeing his corral, house, garden, sheds, and warehouses.

On January 1, 1844, Green was tasked with taking an "exact inventory" of all of Larkin's property except his private house. During Larkin's absence, Green was also responsible for ensuring that Mrs. Larkin had sufficient funds and that the servants behaved properly. Over the next few years, Green continued working for Larkin, steadily increasing his prestige and standing in the community. In January 1846, he made a contract to manage Larkin's mercantile business, handling goods valued at $10,000 for a period of three years, for one-third of the profits.

=== Government role ===
When the United States took over California in July 1846, Green benefited. Acting as Larkin's agent, he supplied a significant portion of the goods purchased by the United States military and naval forces at Monterey in 1846 and 1847. He provided clothing, ordnance, and foodstuffs to figures like Fremont, Fauntleroy, and Maddox.

In the late summer of 1846, Green was appointed to a government office. Captain William Mervine of the United States Navy temporarily assigned him as the collector of the port of Monterey. On September 17, Larkin wrote to Commodore Robert F. Stockton, recommending that Green be given the office permanently. Likely due to this recommendation, Stockton appointed Green to the position, which he held at a salary of $1,000 a year until October 1847, when President Polk ordered that customs in captured ports be collected by Army and Navy officers. During Green's appointment, Walter Colton described him as a native of Pennsylvania who "enjoys a wide reputation for business habits and sterling integrity of character."

Green was chosen to sit on the first jury ever summoned in California. Meeting on September 4, 1846, this jury, in the case of Isaac Graham vs. Charles Roussillon, delivered the well-known "enlightened and impartial verdict" to which "both parties bowed without a dissenting word."

There are indications that Green's conduct during the military occupation of California was questionable. In 1848, Lieutenant William A. T. Maddox accused Green in a letter to Larkin of making false statements about payments for supplies furnished to the naval forces. Green was evidently able to explain the charges satisfactorily, as Larkin's respect for him did not diminish. In later years, Green admitted to dishonorable conduct and bribery related to the condemnation and sale of the merchant ship Admittance by the Admiralty Court at Monterey and Mazatlan. However, this transaction was not widely known until Green disclosed it.

=== Moving to San Francisco ===
In 1847 and 1848, Green was involved in various business ventures. He traveled to Mazatlan, was in San Francisco in January 1848 selling goods, went to Benicia in March to address construction matters for Larkin, and visited the gold mines in the fall. During these two years, his focus shifted from Monterey to San Francisco, especially after the discovery of gold, when he anticipated that San Francisco would soon expand significantly.

Green had owned property in San Francisco for some time, but his significant involvement in the town's business life began on January 1, 1849, when he joined the prominent trading firm of Mellus & Howard. With William D. M. Howard, Henry Mellus, and Francis Mellus as partners, Green started a career that made him a well-known figure in northern California. Over the course of two years, the firm's name and membership changed several times, but it remained one of the largest in the city. Samuel Brannan was also involved in several business ventures with the firm. By early 1851, the Mellus brothers had sold their interests in the firm, which continued as a partnership between Green and W. D. M. Howard, under the name Howard & Green.

=== Green's popularity ===
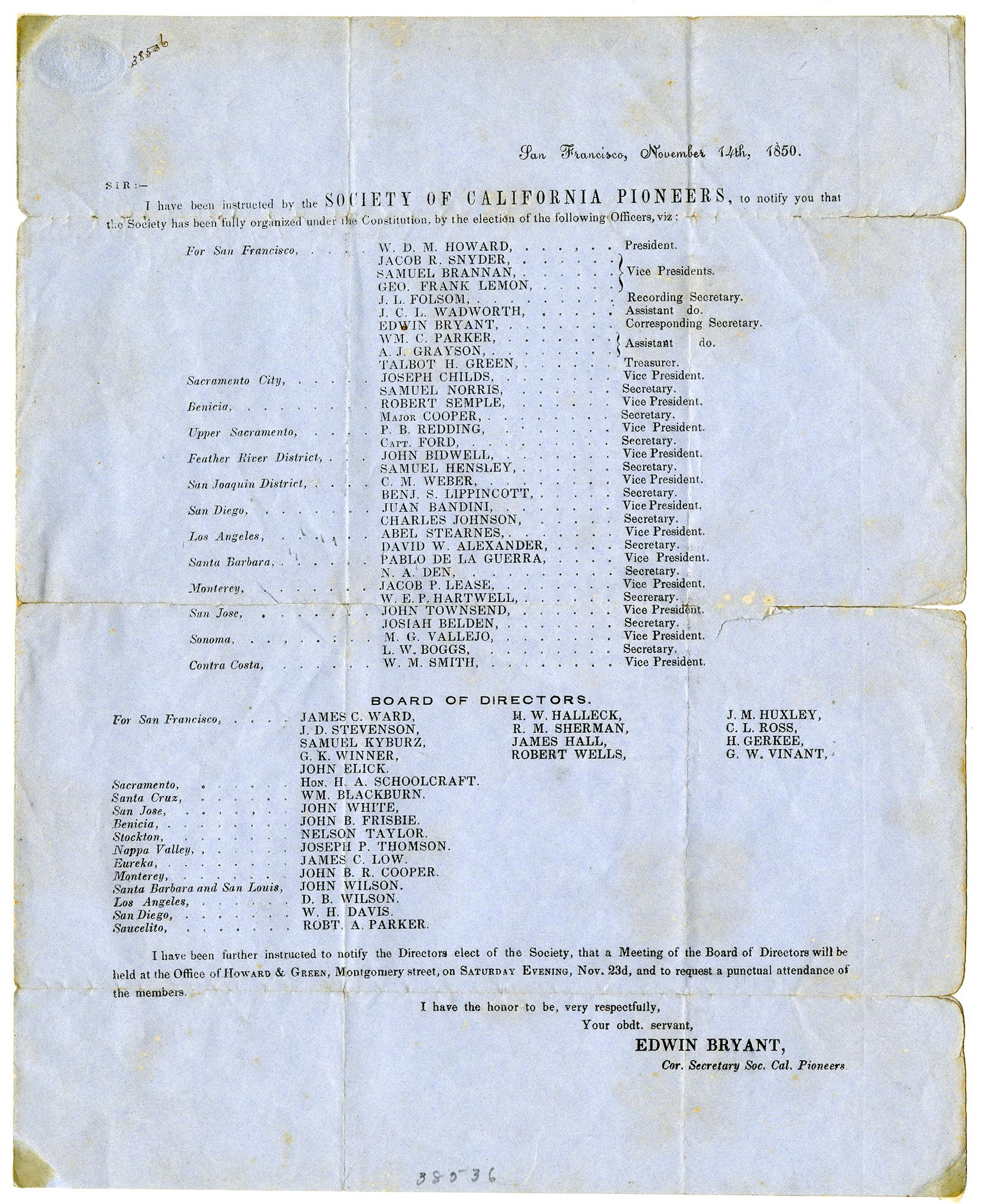
Society of California Pioneers membership certificate. Talbot H. Green is a treasurer.

Green was a popular figure in California with one author claiming, "the widow or the orphan ever found in him a generous friend." One acquaintance described him as "just about the all-around best man I had ever known." Along with his business success, Green gained social prominence and was well known on the streets of San Francisco. Despite his plain appearance, his "kind and off-hand" manner, common sense, and fine judgment made him welcome everywhere. According to another acquaintance, "He was respected by all." In business disputes, Green was often chosen as an arbitrator, frequently serving as the sole arbitrator, even in cases involving large sums. One friend noted, "I cannot recall an instance where his decision was disputed or appealed from by either party."

Prominent figures such as W. D. M. Howard, Samuel Brannan, Thomas O. Larkin, and Captain Folsom acknowledged their close personal friendship with Green. In 1851, Howard, Brannan, and Green all lived in similar cottages on the same block of Mission Street, between Third and Fourth streets. Green was elected as the first treasurer of the Society of California Pioneers upon its founding in 1850.

In the summer of 1849, a gold-seeker who knew Green described him as "the most popular man of all the old Californians." He noted that Green would have likely been elected as one of California's first senators "had he listened to the entreaties of friends, and allowed his name to be used." On October 25, 1849, Green married Sarah Montgomery, the widow of Allen Montgomery, at the San Jose home of his old friend, Grove C. Cook. The event was noted by the editor of the San Francisco Daily Alta California.

=== Public affairs ===
Soon after his arrival in San Francisco, Green became actively involved in public affairs. On February 21, 1849, he was elected to the San Francisco district Legislative Assembly. When that body was replaced by the Ayuntamiento (City Council), he was elected to the Council in August 1849. He was re-elected as councilman on January 8, 1850, and served until May of that year.

As a city official, Green actively participated in civic affairs. He served on the finance committee of the Council and chaired the committee for fencing Portsmouth Square. Early in 1850, Green and Samuel Brannan were among the councilmen accused of using their positions to secure titles to city property. Records indicate that Green purchased thirty-four lots at sales of town lots in 1849 and 1850. These accusations resulted in a public dispute involving Green.

Reports suggest that Green might have been elected mayor of San Francisco in 1850 if he had not declined to run, allowing John W. Geary to win the office. Green sought the Democratic nomination for mayor in April 1851. His involvement in this contest ultimately led to his downfall.

=== Exposure and scandal ===
Rumors began circulating in San Francisco that Talbot H. Green was actually Paul Geddes, a man who had absconded with funds from a Pennsylvania bank and left a deserted wife and family. The exact time when these rumors started is unclear. Some sources suggest that a woman recognized him during the celebrations for California's admission into the Union in 1850. Others claim that a woman publicly accused him of being Paul Geddes at a ball, while still others state that a lawyer from Philadelphia identified him on the street. Upon being recognized, Green reportedly turned pale, trembled, but firmly denied the accusation.

Prior to the mayoralty campaign of 1851, rumors about Green being Paul Geddes did not gain enough traction to harm his reputation significantly. However, his entry into the political contest brought these rumors to the forefront. A day or two before the candidates were to be announced, an incident led Green to withdraw his candidacy. Reports vary on the exact nature of the incident: William Heath Davis suggested that H. P. Hepburn from Philadelphia confronted Green on Montgomery Street and accused him of being Geddes in front of friends, while William White indicated that the exposure resulted from a newspaper notice. (Note: If the unmasking was accomplished by a newspaper notice, the present writer has not been able to find the item. However, the newspaper files consulted were incomplete.)

News of the event quickly spread through the city. Green's closest friends visited him to inquire about the truth of the charges, assuring him of their continued friendship and their determination to support him despite any past misdeeds. Green firmly insisted that the case was one of mistaken identity. Realizing that verbal denials would not clear him of suspicion, he offered to return East to resolve the matter and prove his innocence. Within a day or two, he dissolved his partnership with Howard, transferred some of his property to his wife, and settled his affairs as best he could.

On the afternoon of April 15, 1851, Green left San Francisco on the steamer Panama. His friends stood by him until his departure. Just before he left for the boat, many prominent citizens, merchants, bankers, and others gathered at the Eagle Saloon to bid him farewell, as reported by the next day's Alta California. When the room was filled to capacity, champagne was opened, and Thomas O. Larkin proposed a toast: "The health and prosperity of our friend and fellow citizen, Talbot H. Green; may the best among us be as worthy as we believe him to be." Green responded briefly, thanking everyone for their support and promising to return soon. A witness reported that Green broke down and "sobbed." The entire company then formed a procession and escorted him on board the steamer, continuing to shake his hand until the boat departed from the wharf. One of the attendees stated, "We all turned away with a sad, sickening feeling, as the conviction grew that Green was ... Geddes."

After several months, there was no news from Green. Reports occasionally stated that he had been seen in the East, but there were no indications that he had attempted to clear his name. Over time, it was accepted that Talbot H. Green was Paul Geddes, who had left his home in the East, leaving behind a wife and four children.

== Struggles to recover ==
Two years later, Thomas O. Larkin received a letter from Talbot H. Green, revealing that Green was indeed Paul Geddes. Green admitted to deceiving his California friends and acknowledged his dishonorable actions. Despite his feelings of betrayal, Larkin decided to support his former clerk and agent. Green, hiding in Tennessee, wrote several desperate letters to Larkin, seeking financial assistance and expressing his remorse. Green described his hardships and financial struggles, having lost $3,200 and being left penniless. He requested drafts from Larkin to sustain himself. (Note: According to the terms of Green's contract with Larkin of January 1, 1846, Green was to receive one-third of all profits received from Larkin's mercantile business, which included the sale of supplies to the United States forces.) In one of his letters, Green admitted to taking liquor excessively and promised to abstain from it in the future. He expressed a desire to make amends and clear his debts. Larkin sent Green a draft for $200 in December 1853, which lifted Green's spirits temporarily. Green detailed his early life and the circumstances that led him to adopt the name Talbot H. Green. He explained how he had fled westward, joining the emigration to California with little money.

Throughout early 1854, Green continued to receive newspapers and pamphlets from Larkin but no additional funds. He wrote letters describing his dire situation and the need for financial support to clear his debts and return to California. Green's correspondence revealed his growing despair and frustration with his circumstances. In January 1854, Green received Sarah's application for a divorce, which deeply affected him. (Note: No real divorce was possible, since the marriage of Green and Mrs. Montgomery was not legal.) He expressed his continued love for her and concern for their child. Despite his financial struggles, Green managed to survive by working and relying on the kindness of others.

By mid-1854, Green's letters indicated increasing distrust of his former associates, William D. M. Howard and Joseph P. Thompson. He detailed his grievances and the financial disputes he had with them. Green's health began to suffer due to the stress and anxiety caused by his uncertain situation. In late 1854, Green learned that Sarah had remarried, which further devastated him. Despite this, he expressed his hope for her happiness and continued concern for their child. Green struggled with the reality of his situation and the loss of his former life.

In early 1855, friends and former associates, including Samuel Brannan and William D. M. Howard, began to take steps to help Green settle his affairs. Ebenezer Childs played a crucial role in facilitating communication between Green and his benefactors. Green was eventually able to meet with Brannan in New York City, where arrangements were made to resolve his financial issues. By March 1855, Green successfully settled his accounts with Howard and planned to return to California. He expressed gratitude for the support from his friends and the hope of starting anew. However, upon his return to California, Green found it difficult to reintegrate into society. He faced awkward and strained interactions with former acquaintances, leading him to seek refuge in the Sacramento Valley. (Note: Little is known of Green's stay in California during 1855 and 1856. Some facts were drawn from letters of T. H. Green to T. O. Larkin)

In January 1856, Green learned of Howard's death, which saddened him. Green eventually decided to leave California and return to his family in Pennsylvania. In his farewell letter to Larkin, Green expressed his gratitude for the kindness and support he received and his intention to write from the East.

== Return to Pennsylvania ==
In October 1856, Green returned to Pennsylvania and reunited with his wife and family. He observed the unchanged state of his parents and household but found it challenging to reacquaint himself with his own children. Despite the warm reception from former acquaintances, Green felt a sense of emptiness and decided to travel westward with his wife.

After leaving Pennsylvania, Green was next heard of in Texas, where he was engaged in land speculation under his true name, Paul Geddes. He later lost most of his money and took a position as a clerk to the secretary of the United States Senate. In this capacity, he visited California in 1876 and held the office until at least 1878.

By 1880, Green returned to his boyhood home in Lewisburg, Pennsylvania. He spent the remainder of his life there, reportedly enjoying the confidence and respect of the community. Green never discussed his experiences in California. He died on July 2, 1889, and was survived by his wife and two children.

== Personal life and family ==
Those who knew Green described him as a short, square-built man with plain but kindly features. He was "well-known and well-liked". As Paul Geddes, he married Henrietta Fredrick Geddes. They had children James F. Geddes (1832–1840), Harriet Jenkins Geddes (1835–1855), Mary Elizabeth Geddes (1837–1921), and William Cameron Geddes (1839–1890).

As Talbot H. Green, he married Sarah Armstrong Montgomery (1825–1905), after a lengthy courtship, on October 25, 1849. She divorced him in January 1854. They had a son who was later adopted by Sarah's third husband, Joseph S. Wallis, and took his name to become Talbot H. Wallis.

== Legacy ==
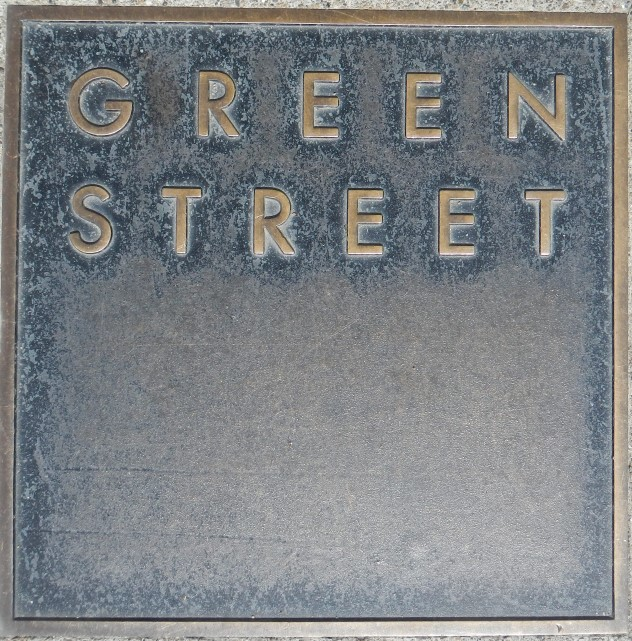
The plaque embedded in the pavement on Green Street in San Francisco

A series of letters written by Green are currently stored in the Bancroft Library of the University of California.

Green Street in San Francisco was named in honor of Talbot H. Green, (Note: One of the earliest mentions of Green Street was made in the Daily Alta California newspaper on January 7, 1850.) along with other streets named after California pioneers such as Larkin, Brannan, Folsom and Howard. Green Street runs through several neighborhoods, including North Beach and Russian Hill, which are areas rich in San Francisco's history.

== See also ==
- Thomas O. Larkin
- Sarah Wallis

== Bibliography ==
- Hussey, John Adam (March 1939). "New Light upon Talbot H. Green: As Revealed by His Own Letters and Other Sources". California Historical Society Quarterly. 18 (1). University of California Press: 32–63. doi:10.2307/25160810. JSTOR 25160810.
- Leek, Nancy (2017). The Sensational Saga of Talbot H. Green. goldfields books.
- Larkin, Thomas O. (1850). Letters from T. H. Green to T. O. Larkin in Documents, MS. Berkely: Berkeley Library. University of California.
- Larkin, Thomas Oliver (1856). Thomas O. Larkin papers, 1839-1856. Berkely: Berkeley Library. University of California.
- Dawson, Nicholas (1933). Narrative of Nicholas "Cheyenne" Dawson. San Francisco: The Grabhorn Press.
- White, William Francis (1881). A Picture of Pioneer Times in California. San Francisco: W. M. Hinton & Co.
- Hittell, Theodore H. (1898). History of California. San Francisco: The Stone Educational Company.
- Davis, William Heath (1929). Seventy-five Years in California. San Francisco: John Howell.
