= Shirley Williamson =

American artist

- Born: Maud Shirley Perry; May 25, 1875; New York City, U.S.
- Died: March 30, 1944 (aged 68); Palo Alto, California, U.S.
- Education: Art Students League of New York, Académie Julian
- Years active: 1913–1940
- Known for: artist
- Movement: California Impressionism

Shirley Williamson (1875–1944) was an American artist and educator, known for her seaside paintings and monotype prints. She was active between 1913 until 1940, in New York City, the San Francisco Bay Area and Carmel, California.

== Early life and education ==
At birth she was named Maud Shirley Perry and was born May 25, 1875, in New York City, New York. She attended classes at the Art Students League of New York studying with William Merritt Chase, and later with Arthur Wesley Dow. She married physician Edward Lincoln Williamson in 1903, together they had a son. Williamson continued her studies at Académie Julian in Paris, studying with Jean-Joseph Benjamin-Constant and with Auguste Rodin.

== Career ==
Between 1913 and 1926, the Williamson's lived in Berkeley and around the East Bay. By 1914, they had a second home in Carmel, California and the same year The New York Times newspaper named Williamson one of a few “notable” artists of Carmel. Her monotype print work was exhibited at the 1915 Panama-Pacific International Exhibition (PPIE) in the United States Section, sponsored by the San Francisco Art Association.

In 1927, the family moved to 1344 Tasso Street in Palo Alto, while the family still maintained the second home in Carmel. Her husband died by 1930, and the family moved two years later in 1932 to nearby 521 Addison Avenue in Palo Alto.

She was a member of the National Association of Women Painter's and Sculptors; the Pacific Art League (previously known as Palo Alto Art Club); and San Francisco Art Association. While living in New York City, Williamson had been a president and member of the Woman's Art Club of New York.

She taught craft classes at Carmel Summer School of Art in 1924 and 1925, a dramatics class at Stanford University Summer School in 1930, and after 1940 she taught evening classes at Palo Alto High School.

Shirley Williamson died on March 30, 1944, in Palo Alto, and she is buried in Albany, New York.
