= Eva Joseph Goldsheid =

German painter

Eva Joseph Goldsheid (March 20, 1926 – June 14, 2016) was a German-born American artist and educator, known as painter, and printmaker.

== Early life and education ==
Eva Joseph was on born March 20, 1926, in Halle (Saale), Germany. She was from an Orthodox Jewish family in the banking industry, daughter of Ernest David and Rosa (née Stein) Joseph. Her father died when she was eleven, and she and her mother fled Germany to escape the Nazis. After a brief period in Amsterdam, Joseph and her mother emigrated to New York in 1938, leaving behind everything they owned.

In 1946, as Joseph became progressively immersed in her work as a painter, she moved to the San Francisco Bay Area. She earned two degrees from the University of California, Berkeley (BA 1947; MA 1959). She also attended classes at the California School of Fine Arts (San Francisco Art Institute).

== Career ==
After moving to Southern California in 1991 to be closer to her daughter, she taught art classes at the South Bay Adult School in Manhattan Beach.

=== Works on paper ===
Joseph's style developed in the 1980s when she took up printmaking. Here she successfully combined the lessons of three midcentury styles: Bay Area Figurative painting, modern graphic design, and Japanese woodblock printing. Originally working at Kala Art Institute in Berkeley, California, Joseph produced dozens of striking abstract prints that evoke the midcentury modern aesthetic. Most of these works have not been shown or published. They were discovered in her home after she died by her daughter Sumi Berney.

== Death ==
She died June 14, 2016, in Los Angeles, California.
