= Marianne Kolb =

Swiss painter

Marianne Kolb (born 1958 in Bern) is a Swiss painter who lives in California. She is known for her emotional figurative paintings.

Kolb paints directly onto the canvas with her hands, placing her figures in isolation on a monochromatic, textured background. In regard to her figurative work, the artist stated that "The human figure is the vehicle with which I can most positively relate." Kolb has also stated that the imagery, "derives from direct observation of individuals transmuted by her own feelings which become fully known to her during the painting process." Kolb's work has been located within a legacy of Northern European paintings (including artists such as Edvard Munch and Francis Bacon), although journalist and art critic Daniella Walsh describes Kolb's work as exhibiting "quieter, inner angst…..To the enlightenment or distress of her audience, Kolb paints the soul." Kolb's work is part of the permanent collection of the Boise Art Museum.

Kolb is a member of the California Society of Printmakers.
