= Edward McNeil Farmer =

- Born: February 23, 1901; Los Angeles, California, U.S.
- Died: August 20, 1969 (aged 68); Palo Alto, California, U.S.
- Education: Stanford University
- Known for: Painting, professor
- Spouse(s): Mabel McKibben Farmer, Arbie Stewart Farmer
- Children: 3

Edward McNeil Farmer (1901–1969) was an American artist, designer, and professor. Best known for his watercolors and oil paintings of landscapes and flower studies. He taught at the Graphic Arts Department at Stanford University from 1923 until 1964 and played a role in the development of the Art Department.

== Early life and education ==
Edward McNeil Farmer was born on February 23, 1901, in Los Angeles, California. In 1919, he attended Stanford University. Farmer graduated in 1923 with his B.A. degree, and in 1926 with his M.A. degree in Graphic Arts from Stanford. While attending Stanford University, he studied with his aunt, Chloe Lesley Starks. Both his father and mother had graduated from Stanford, as well as all of his siblings. His aunt Chloe Lesley Starks and uncle Everett Parker Lesley graduated from Stanford University and served as professors, his aunt was a professor in the Graphic Arts Department and his uncle was a professor in the Mechanical Engineering Department.

Farmer continued his studies at the Rudolph Schaeffer School of Design in San Francisco. Farmer and his wife Mabel studied at the Art Students League of New York in 1929 and 1930, with George Bridgman, Charles Locke, Dimitri Romanovsky, and Jan Matulka.

== Career ==
Farmer was primarily a painter, but in his early years he was a printmaker working in lithography and woodcuts, working in watercolors in the 1930s and 1940s, and followed by oil paintings.

He taught at Stanford University after graduation in 1923, and until his retirement in 1964. He introduced Art History courses to the school in 1933. Farmer served as the head of the Graphic Arts Department from 1940 until 1956.

Farmer participated in the Golden Gate International Exposition (GGIE) in 1938. He was a member of the Palo Alto Art Club (now known as the Pacific Art League), and active in the Santa Cruz Art League, American Water Color Society, among others. He acted as secretary of the Pacific Arts Association in 1927.

== Personal life ==
He married artist Mabel McKibben Farmer, she had also studied at Stanford University. Together they had three children, Andrew, Mark, and Edward. His first wife Mabel died in 1956, he remarried Arbie Stewart Farmer (née Scott) and remained married until his death.

Farmer died after a heart attack on August 20, 1969, in his Palo Alto, California, home.

== See also ==
- Pacific Art League
