= Elizabeth Norton (artist) =

American artist (1887–1985)

Elizabeth Sawyer Norton
- Born: December 16, 1887; Chicago, Illinois, U.S.
- Died: August 7, 1985 (aged 97); Palo Alto, California, U.S.
- Resting place: Graceland Cemetery, Chicago, Illinois, U.S.
- Education: Art Institute of Chicago, Art Students League of New York, National Academy of Design, Chase School
- Known for: printmaking, painting, sculpture

Elizabeth Sawyer Norton (1887–1985) was an American artist, known for her bronze sculptures, paintings, and printmaking. The subject of her work often featured animals, landscapes and/or portraits. She lived in Palo Alto, California, from 1919 until her death in 1985.

== Early life and education ==
Elizabeth Sawyer Norton was born December 16, 1887, in Chicago, Illinois, to lawyer James Sanger Norton (1844–1896) and Frances Julia Rumsey (1850–1933).

Norton studied fine art at the Art Institute of Chicago in 1910. She continued her studies at Art Students League of New York with Frank DuMond, the National Academy of Design of New York and the Chase School (which later became Parsons School of Design).

While still living in New York City, one of her students was sculptor, Katharine Underhill (born 1892).

== Career ==
Norton had a successful career and exhibited her art in many galleries in New York City. She had made artistic contributions to exhibitions at the Smithsonian Institution throughout her career.

She had an older sister named Frances Sanger Norton (married name, Brown) that had moved to Palo Alto, California because her husband Harry Brown was a professor in the Philosophy Department at Stanford University. Norton traveled to California in 1915 to attend to Panama–Pacific International Exposition (PPIE) and to visit her sister. She returned four years later in 1919 to move to Palo Alto, after struggling with bouts with the flu. Her brother-in-law Harry Brown designed her home at 353 Lowell Avenue.

When Norton moved to California she became interested in printmaking, prior to which she primarily worked in sculpture, pastels, and oil paint. Norton was a founding member of the Palo Alto Art Club (now the Pacific Art League) in 1921. Norton was a member of the California Society of Etchers; Palo Alto Art Club (now known as the Pacific Art League); American Federation of Arts; and San Francisco Women Painters.

== Death and legacy ==
In the last 20 years of Norton's life she lived at Channing House, a retirement community in Palo Alto. Norton died on August 7, 1985, in Palo Alto, California, and is buried in Chicago at the Graceland Cemetery.

Her work is in many public museum collections including the Metropolitan Museum of Art, the Fogg Museum of Art, Yale University Art Gallery, Nelson-Atkins Museum of Art, Fine Arts Museums of San Francisco (FAMSF), the Smithsonian Institution's National Portrait Gallery, among others.

The Pacific Art League of Palo Alto has dedicated a solo-exhibition gallery in her name, the "Elizabeth Norton studio" and the "Elizabeth Norton Distinguished Service Award".

Her bronze bust of David Starr Jordan is on display at Hoover Institution at Stanford University.

== Exhibitions ==
- 1920 – Stanford University, Stanford, California
- 1926 – Series of animal wood block prints, Gump's, San Francisco, California
- 1929 – Courvoisier Gallery, San Francisco, California
- 1939 – Golden Gate International Exposition, San Francisco, California
- 1942 – solo exhibition of sculptures and watercolors, California State Library, Sacramento, California
- 1942 – National Academy of Design, New York City, New York
- 1944 – American Color Print Society, New York City, New York
- 1946 – Wichita Art Association, Wichita, Kanas
- 1950 – Stanford University, Stanford, California
