= Sigrid Lorenzen Rupp =

American architect

- Born: 1943; Bremerhaven, Germany
- Died: May 27, 2004 (aged 60–61)
- Education: University of California, Berkeley
- Occupation: Architect
- Spouse: Steven Rupp
- Practice: SLR Architects

Sigrid Lorenzen Rupp (1943 – May 27, 2004) was a German-American architect. She ran a private practice, SLR Architects, in Palo Alto, California, from 1976 to 1998, and specialized in designing facilities for tech companies in Silicon Valley.

== Early life and education ==
Rupp was born in Bremerhaven, Germany, on January 3, 1943, and migrated to Oakland, California, with her family at the age of 10. She became interested in architecture as a child during the German reconstruction boom after World War II and went on to study architecture at the University of California, Berkeley, graduating in 1966; she received her California Architecture License in 1971. Upon graduation Rupp worked for several architectural firms, including Van Bourg/Nakamura Associates of San Francisco, D'Amico Associates of Mill Valley, Hawley & Peterson of Mountain Valley and Spencer Associates of Palo Alto.

== Career ==
Rupp worked for various firms in the San Francisco Bay Area before establishing her own practice, SLR Architects, in 1976. She specialized in technical and industrial facilities and provided designs for many early tech companies in Silicon Valley, including Amdahl Corporation, Apple Computer, Claris, IBM, Raychem, Sun Microsystems and Tandem Computers. Her design of a testing facility for Apple won an American Institute of Architects (AIA) Honor Award. She designed Stanford University's Storey House and Press Building, and also completed projects for AT&T, Pac Bell, Pan Am, San Jose State University and United Airlines. SLR Architects, which was based in East Palo Alto, California, closed in 1998 when Rupp retired.

Rupp was an advocate of women's rights and was a member of the Organization of Women Architects (OWA), the Union Internationale des Femmes Architectes (U.I.F.A.), and the American Institute of Architects (AIA). In 1998, her work was added to the International Archive of Women in Architecture at Virginia Tech University. She said that she started campaigning for women's issues "simply because I did not want there to be any [women's issues]. It seemed that the time for gender differences should be long over." She was the chairperson of the City of Palo Alto Architectural Review Board, director of the AIA Santa Clara chapter, and director of California Women in Environmental Design.

The University of California-Berkeley, where Rupp studied architecture, awards the Berkeley-Rupp Architecture Professorship and Prize biannually to a practitioner or scholar who has contributed to promoting the advancement of women in the field.

== Personal life ==
Rupp traveled extensively throughout her career and during her retirement focused on painting watercolors of landscapes around the Bay Area of San Francisco. She kept numerous travel journals where she recorded written observations, photographs, sketches, and watercolors. Her paintings were include in juried exhibitions organized by the Pacific Art League of Palo Alto. Of her life and career, Rupp said, "I'd like to be remembered for dissenting when everyone else thought it easier to go with the grain even when the grain was wrong. I'd like to be remembered for being a competent architect who did competent work, a competent painter who did competent painting and someone who told good stories. I've enjoyed almost everything I [did], but nothing is enough and time (life) is too short."

Rupp was diagnosed with gastric cancer in November 2003 and died on May 27, 2004. She was married to Steven Rupp.
