= Bertha Elizabeth Stringer Lee =

American painter

- Born: Bertha Elizabeth Stringer; December 6, 1869; San Francisco, California, U.S.
- Died: March 19, 1939 (aged 69); Palo Alto, California, U.S.
- Known for: Painting
- Movement: California Impressionism
- Spouse: Louis Eugene Lee (m. 1894)

Bertha Elizabeth Stringer Lee (1869-1937) was an American painter, known for her California landscapes painted within the California Impressionist style.

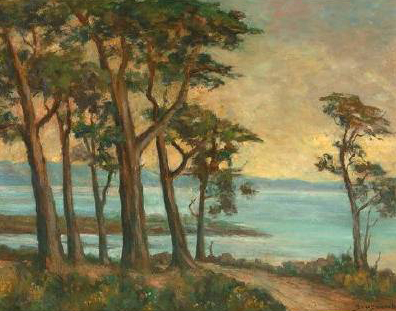
Monterey Bay, Pacific Grove by Bertha Elizabeth Stringer Lee

== Biography ==
Bertha Elizabeth Lee (née Stringer) was born on December 6, 1869, in San Francisco. She graduated from the University of California, Berkeley and went on to study painting with Amédée Joullin, William Keith, Arthur Frank Mathews, and Raymond Yelland.

She married Eugene Lee in 1894. The couple lived in San Francisco and Lee primarily painted California scenes.

She exhibited her work at the Woman's Building at the 1893 World's Columbian Exposition in Chicago, Illinois. She also exhibited at the California State Fair, the Alaska–Yukon–Pacific Exposition, and the Mark Hopkins Institute. In 1922 she had a one-woman show at Richelieu Gallery in San Francisco.

Lee died on March 19, 1937, in Palo Alto, California.
