= Pocket camera =

Pocket Camera may refer to:

- Game Boy Camera, marketed as Pocket Camera in Japan
- Pocket Instamatic, a series of camera by Kodak introduced in 1972
- Hole cam, a type of camera used in poker that displays a player's face-down cards
- Blackmagic Pocket Cinema Camera, a line of digital movie cameras first released in 2013

== See also ==
- Point-and-shoot camera, a compact camera designed to fit in a pocket
