= Margo Davis =

American photographer

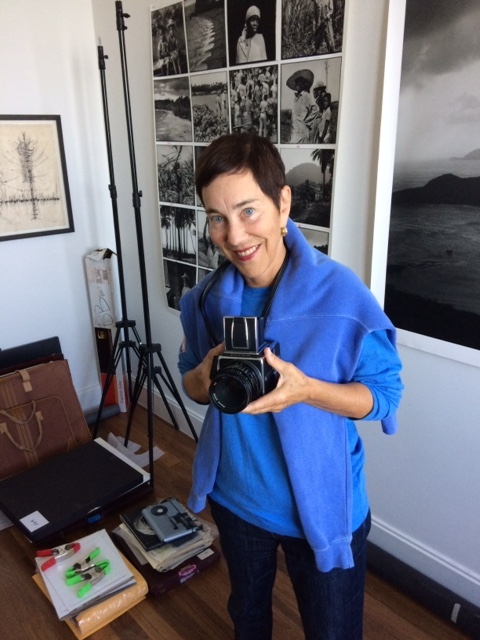
- Born: Margo Baumgarten; 1944 (age 81–82)
- Education: UC Berkeley (BA) San Jose State University (MA)
- Known for: Fine Art Portraiture, Documentary Photography
- Spouses: Gregson Davis; Anthony Browne
- Website: margodavisphoto.com

Margo Baumgarten Davis is a photographer, educator and author of several photographer's books.

== Personal life ==
Margo was raised in Connecticut and has lived for over 30 years in Palo Alto, California. She attended Bennington College, spent time at the Sorbonne studying French literature, and graduated from University of California, Berkeley. It was at UC Berkeley where she met her first husband Gregson Davis and traveled frequently to his home country of Antigua. She has a daughter, Anika and a son, Julian.

== Photography career ==
Davis has produced photography in Paris, Italy, Nigeria and in the Caribbean, and has done a significant amount of portraiture. Davis has photographed Saul Bellow, Maxine Kingston, Tillie Olsen, Ursula K. Le Guin, Diane Johnson, and Kay Boyle.

In Nigeria, Davis produced a number of photographs of the Fula people.

Davis has spent time lecturing at Stanford on photojournalism with the communications department. She has also taught photography at University of California, Berkeley, and University of California, Santa Cruz.

In 2017, Margo's book Antigua: Photographs 1967-1973 was published by Nazraeli Press. At interview, Margo said she produced the book after hearing interest expressed at an exhibit in Antigua.

== Publications ==
- Davis, Gregson; Davis, Margo (1973). Antigua Black: Portrait of an Island People (1 ed.). San Francisco, California: Scrimshaw Press. ISBN 091202030X.
- Davis, Gregson; Davis, Margo (1983). Antonia Astori, Designer. Naples, Italy: Edizioni LAN.
- Yalom, Marilyn; Davis, Margo (1983). Women Writers of the West Coast: Speaking of Their Lives and Careers (1 ed.). Santa Barbara: Capra Press. ISBN 0884962040.
- Davis, Margo; Nilan, Roxanne (1989). The Stanford Album: A Photographic History, 1885-1945. Stanford, California: Stanford University Press. ISBN 978-0-804-71639-0.
- Davis, Margo (2004). Under One Sky. Stanford, California: Stanford University Press. ISBN 9780804742665.
- Davis, Margo (2017). Antigua: Photographs 1967-1973 (1 ed.). Munich, Germany: Nazraeli Press. ISBN 978-1-59005-448-2.
- Editors,(2026), www.dodho.com, https://www.dodho.com/following-the-light-with-a-camera-by-margo-davis/
