= List of people from San Francisco =

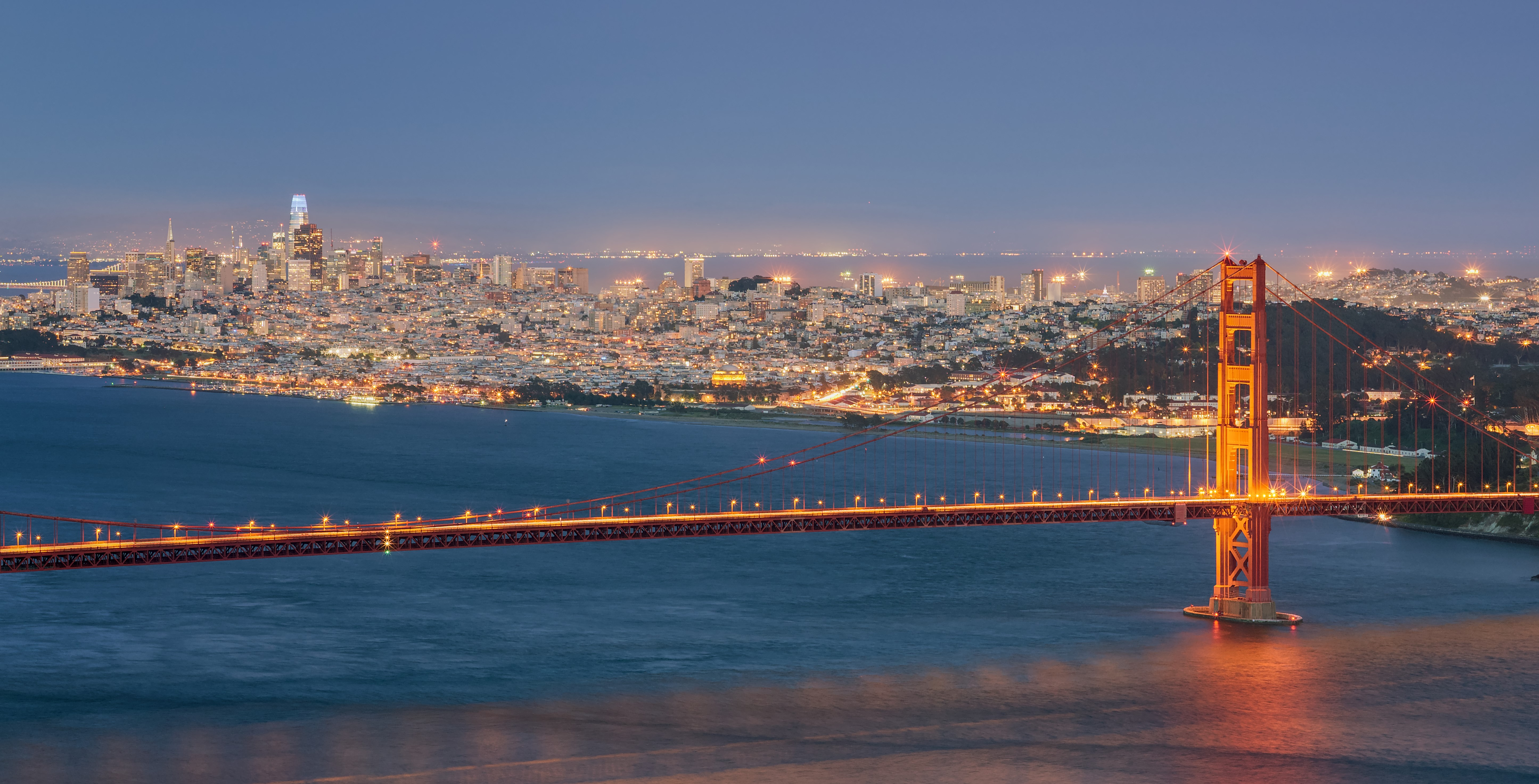
Golden Gate Bridge and San Francisco skyline

This is a list of notable people from San Francisco, California. It includes people who were born or raised in, lived in, or spent significant portions of their lives in San Francisco, or for whom San Francisco is a significant part of their identity, as well as music groups founded in San Francisco. This list is in order by primary field of notability, and then in alphabetical order by last name.

== Academics ==
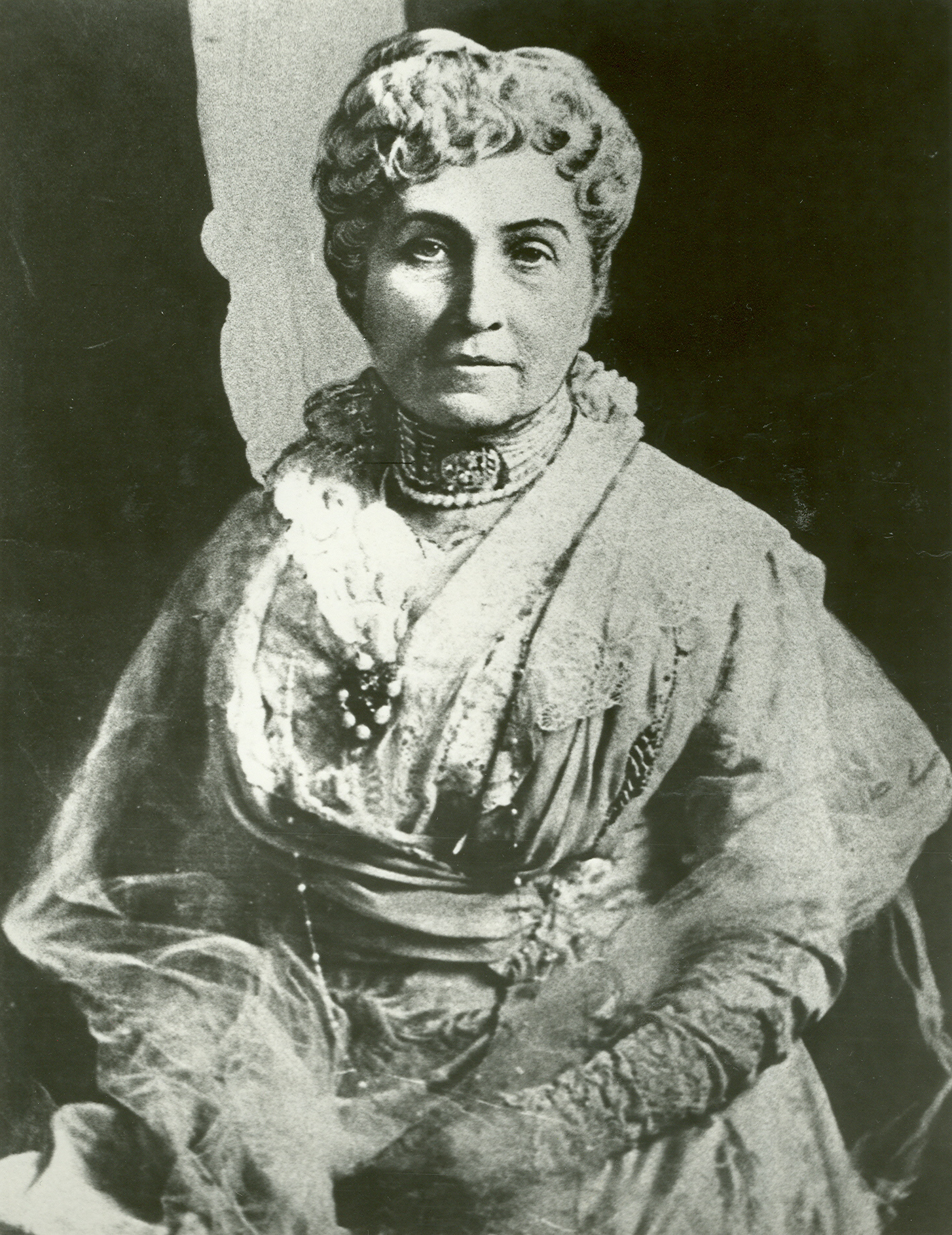
Phoebe Hearst, philanthropist, feminist, and suffragist

- James Reed Averill (1935–2024), psychologist and professor
- Andrew Smith Hallidie (1836–1900), promoter of the first cable car line, regent of the University of California 1868–1900
- Phoebe Hearst (1842–1919), first female regent of the University of California, socialite, philanthropist, feminist, and suffragist
- Terry Karl (born 1947), professor of Latin American Studies at Stanford University

== Athletes ==
=== Baseball ===
See San Francisco Giants#Baseball Hall of Famers for San Francisco Giants players in the Baseball Hall of Fame.

- Jim Baxes (1928–1996), third baseman
- Ping Bodie (1887–1961), outfielder, played for the Chicago White Sox (1911–1914), Philadelphia Athletics (1917) and New York Yankees (1919–1921), born and raised in San Francisco
- Sam Bohne (originally "Sam Cohen"; 1896–1977), Major League Baseball player
- Barry Bonds (born 1964), outfielder
- Bobby Bonds (1946–2003), outfielder
- Fred Breining (born 1955), pitcher for San Francisco Giants (1980–1984)
- Madison Bumgarner (born 1988), pitcher for San Francisco Giants
- Matt Cain (born 1984), pitcher
- Dolph Camilli (1907–1997), first baseman, played for the Philadelphia Phillies and Brooklyn Dodgers, born and raised in San Francisco
- Ike Caveney (1894–1949), shortstop
- Orlando Cepeda (born 1937), 1st baseman, inductee into the Baseball Hall of Fame
- Gino Cimoli (1929–2011), outfielder, born and raised in San Francisco
- Joe Corbett (1875–1945), pitcher, born in San Francisco
- Joe Cronin (1906–1984), infielder, Baseball Hall of Fame, born and raised in San Francisco
- Frankie Crosetti (1910–2002), shortstop and coach
- Tim Cullen (born 1942), infielder
- Babe Dahlgren (1912–1996), first baseman
- Joe DeMaestri (1928–2016), shortstop
- Dom DiMaggio (1917–2009), outfielder
- Bob Elliott (1916–1966), player and manager
- Jim Fregosi (1942–2014), player and manager
- Al Gallagher (1945–2018), third baseman for the San Francisco Giants and California Angels (1970–1973)
- Jonny Gomes (born 1980), outfielder for Boston Red Sox
- Herb Gorman (1924–1953), player in one MLB game
- Harry Heilmann (1894–1951), outfielder, Baseball Hall of Fame
- Keith Hernandez (born 1953), first baseman
- Jackie Jensen (1927–1982), also in the College Football Hall of Fame
- Eddie Joost (1916–2011), player and manager
- Willie Kamm (1900–1988), third baseman
- George Kelly (1895–1984), first baseman, Baseball Hall of Fame
- Steve Kerr (born 1965), head coach of the Golden State Warriors and eight-time NBA champion
- Mark Koenig (1904–1993), infielder for 1927 New York Yankees
- Tony Lazzeri (1903–1946), infielder, Baseball Hall of Fame
- Tim Lincecum (born 1984), pitcher
- Willie McCovey (1938–2018), 1st baseman, inductee into the Baseball Hall of Fame
- Nyjer Morgan (born 1980), outfielder for Milwaukee Brewers
- Hunter Pence (born 1983), outfielder
- Mark Prior (born 1980), baseball pitcher for Chicago Cubs (2002–2004), born in San Francisco
- Charlie Sweeney (1863–1902), pitcher
- Mike Vail (born 1951), outfielder
- Tyler Walker (born 1976), relief pitcher for Washington Nationals

=== Basketball ===
- Jason Kidd (born 1973), basketball player
- Tom Meschery (born 1938)
- Pete Newell (1915–2008), Olympic and USF coach
- Gary Payton (born 1968), NBA player
- Phil Smith (1952–2002)
- Phil Woolpert (1915–1987), San Francisco high school and college coach

=== Boxing ===
- Abe Attell (1883–1970), world featherweight champion
- James J. Corbett (1866–1933), world heavyweight champion
- Andre Ward (born 1984), 2004 Olympics light heavyweight gold medal winner

=== Football ===
- Andre Alexander (born 1967), CFL wide receiver
- Gary Beban (born 1946), NFL quarterback and 1967 Heisman Trophy winner
- Ed Berry (born 1963), NFL defensive back for Green Bay Packers and San Diego Chargers
- Tom Brady (born 1977), NFL quarterback for New England Patriots and two-time NFL most valuable player
- Tedy Bruschi (born 1973), NFL linebacker for New England Patriots
- Al Cowlings (born 1947), USC and NFL defensive lineman
- Chris Darkins (born 1974), NFL running back for Green Bay Packers
- Bob deLauer (1920–2002), NFL center
- Matt Dickerson (born 1995), NFL defensive end for the Atlanta Falcons
- Eddie Forrest (1921–2001), NFL offensive lineman for San Francisco 49ers
- Beau Gardner, college football long snapper for the Georgia Bulldogs
- Jason Hill (born 1985), NFL wide receiver for the Jacksonville Jaguars
- Mike Holmgren (born 1948), NFL head coach for Green Bay Packers and president of Cleveland Browns
- James Hundon (born 1971), NFL player
- Zeph Lee (born 1963), NFL player
- Joe Montana (born 1956), NFL quarterback for San Francisco 49ers, inductee into Pro Football Hall of Fame
- John Nisby (1936–2011), NFL guard with the Pittsburgh Steelers and Washington Redskins; one of the first African American players to play for the Washington Redskins
- Paul Oglesby (1939–1994), Oakland Raiders tackle
- Igor Olshansky (born 1982), NFL defensive end for Dallas Cowboys
- Jerry Rice (born 1962), NFL wide receiver for San Francisco 49ers, inductee into Pro Football Hall of Fame
- George Seifert (born 1940), head coach of the San Francisco 49ers (1989–1996), Carolina Panthers (1999–2001)
- O. J. Simpson (1947–2024), NFL running back with Buffalo Bills and San Francisco 49ers (1985); inductee into Pro Football Hall of Fame; previously City College of San Francisco and USC running back
- Donald Strickland (born 1980), current NFL cornerback for the New York Jets
- Eric Wright (born 1985), NFL cornerback for Detroit Lions
- Steve Young (born 1961), NFL quarterback for San Francisco 49ers, inductee into Pro Football Hall of Fame

=== Golf ===
- Danielle Kang (born 1992), professional golfer
- Johnny Miller (born 1947), professional golfer, TV commentator
- Ken Venturi (1931–2013), professional golfer, TV commentator
- Michelle Wie (born 1989), professional golfer

=== Other sports ===
- Townsend Bell (born 1975), race car driver
- George Bignotti (1916–2013), motor racing team owner and mechanic
- Otey Cannon (born 1950), soccer player who was the first black American player in the North American Soccer League
- Cheerleader Melissa (born 1982), pro wrestler
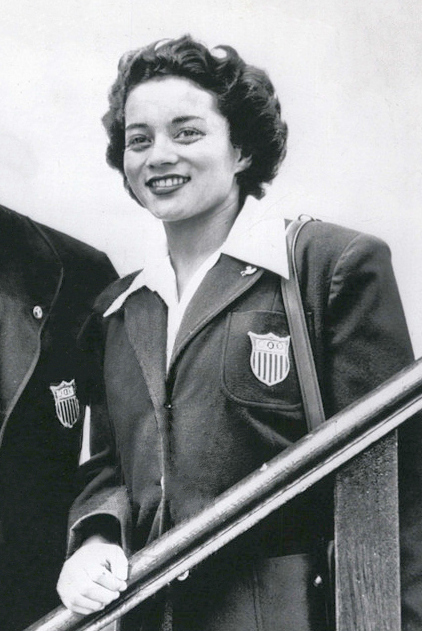
- Vicki Draves, Olympic gold medalist diver
  Mark Crear (born 1969), two-time Olympic medallist in 110m hurdles
- Ann Curtis (1926–2012), two-time Olympic gold medalist and one-time silver medalist in swimming
- Vicki Draves (1924–2010), two-time Olympic gold medalist, diver, first Asian American gold medalist
- Ken Flax (born 1963), Olympic hammer thrower
- Al Gordon (1902–1936), race car driver
- Hans Halberstadt (1885–1966), German-born American Olympic fencer
- Laird Hamilton (born 1964), surfer
- Helen Jacobs (1908–1997), tennis player
- Jeremy McGrath (born 1971), motocross rider
- Cruz Medina (born 2006), soccer player
- Jonny Moseley (born 1975), freestyle skiing Olympic gold medalist
- Jimmy Murphy (1894–1924), race car driver
- Bill Nelson (born 1944), bull rider
- Katelyn Ohashi (born 1997), artistic gymnast
- Brooks Orpik (born 1980), NHL player for the Washington Capitals
- Elaine Pedersen (1936–2000), long-distance runner
- Shannon Rowbury (born 1984), 2-time track & field Olympian, American record holder at 1500m, world record holder in distance medley relay
- Bill Schaadt (1924–1995), fly fisherman
- Emerson Spencer (1906–1985), Olympic track and field gold medalist
- Shawn Spikes (born 1996), thoroughbred jockey
- Ben Wildman-Tobriner (born 1984), Olympic swimming gold medalist
- Al Young (born 1946), drag racing world champion

== Business ==
- Albert Abrams (1863–1924), inventor of medical equipment in the field of electricity therapy
- Sam Altman (born 1985), chairman of Y Combinator, co-chairman of OpenAI
- Melvin Belli (1907–1996), attorney known as the "king of torts", died in San Francisco
- Friedrich Bendixen (1864–1920), American-born German banker
- Marc Benioff (born 1964), founder and co-CEO of Salesforce
- Nathan Blecharczyk (born 1983), chief strategy officer and co-founder of Airbnb
- Thomas Henry Blythe (born Thomas Williams, 1822–1883), emigrated to the San Francisco from Wales and became a wealthy capitalist
- Bill Bowes (1926–2016), venture capitalist, philanthropist, and co-founder of U.S. Venture Partners
- Luke Brugnara (born 1963), real estate investor
- Brian Chesky (born 1981), CEO and co-founder of Airbnb
- Jason Citron (born 1984), CEO and co-founder of Discord and founder of OpenFeint
- Ron Conway (born 1951), angel investor and philanthropist
- George Washington Dennis (c. 1825–1916), 19th-century entrepreneur, real estate developer, and advocate for Black rights
- Barry Diller (born 1942), co-founder of Fox Broadcasting Company
- Mickey Drexler (born 1944), CEO of J. Crew and Gap Inc.
- Donald Fisher (1928–2009), co-founder of the Gap clothing company
- Doris F. Fisher (born 1931), co-founder of the Gap clothing company
- Philip Arthur Fisher (1907–2004), investor, author, entrepreneur
- Aaron Fleishhacker (1820–1898), paper box manufacturer, Gold Rush-era entrepreneur, local philanthropist
- Joe Gebbia (born 1981), co-founder and chief product officer of Airbnb
- Gordon Getty (born 1934), oil philanthropist and composer
- Warren Hellman (1934–2011), private equity investor and founder of Hardly Strictly Bluegrass festival
- Jess Jackson (1930–2011), wine entrepreneur and founder of Kendall-Jackson wine company
- Steve Jobs (1955–2011), co-founder of Apple Inc., born in and adopted in San Francisco
- Max Levchin (born 1975), PayPal co-founder
- Lew Hing (1858–1934), Chinese-born American industrialist and banker; founder of Chinatown in San Francisco, as well as Chinatown in Oakland, California
- James Lick (1796–1876), real estate investor, carpenter, piano builder, land baron, and patron of the sciences
- Larry Livermore (born 1947), founder of Lookout Records
- Marissa Mayer (born 1975), information technology executive, and co-founder of Lumi Labs; former president and chief executive officer of Yahoo!
- Jesse B. McCargar (1879–1954), banker and industrialist
- Pete McDonough (1872–1947), bail bonds broker, called "the fountainhead of corruption" in 1937 police graft investigation
- Morris Meyerfeld Jr. (1855–1935), German-born entrepreneur and theater owner (Orpheum Vaudeville Circuit)
- Gordon E. Moore (1929–2023), co-founder of Intel Corporation, author of Moore's law
- Michael Moritz (born 1954), venture capitalist at Sequoia Capital
- Craig Newmark (born 1951), founder of Craigslist
- Alexis Ohanian (born 1983), co-founder of Reddit
- Jack O'Neill (1923–2017), founder of O'Neill surf equipment
- Jay Paul, real estate developer
- Mark Pincus (born 1966), founder of Zynga
- Bob Pritikin (1929–2022), advertising executive, creative director, author, art collector, and bon vivant
- William Chapman Ralston (1826–1875), founder of the Bank of California
- Kevin Rose (born 1977), internet entrepreneur, co-founded Revision3, Digg, Pownce, and Milk
- Stockton Rush (1962–2023), co-founder and CEO of the deep-sea exploration company OceanGate
- Charles R. Schwab (born 1937), businessman, founder of Schwab investment firm
- Jessie L. Seal (1864–1946), floriculturist; floristry business owner
- Theresa Sparks (born 1949), CEO of sex toy company Good Vibrations
- Tom Steyer (born 1957), hedge fund manager and political activist
- Levi Strauss (1829–1902), German-American Gold Rush-era businessman who founded the first company to manufacture blue jeans, Levi Strauss & Co., headquartered in San Francisco
- Rikki Streicher (1922–1994), LGBT leader, bar owner and co-founder of the Gay Games
- Adolph Sutro (1830–1898), German-American engineer, business man, politician and philanthropist who served as the 24th mayor of San Francisco 1895–1897
- Aaron Swartz (1986–2011), co-founder of Reddit
- Eric Swenson (1946–2011), co-founder of Thrasher Magazine and Independent Truck Company
- Peter Thiel (born 1967), co-founder of PayPal, founder of Clarium Capital
- Richard M. Tobin (1866–1952), president of Hibernia Bank and Minister to the Netherlands
- George Treat (1819–1907), early Gold Rush-era pioneer in the Mission District, of San Francisco, businessman, abolitionist, member of the first Committee of Vigilance of San Francisco, and horse racing enthusiast
- Walter Varney (1888–1967), aviation pioneer, founded the predecessors to both United Airlines and Continental Airlines
- Fausto Vitello (1946–2006), creator of Thrasher Magazine, co-creator of Independent Trucks
- Pat Walker (1939–1999), activist, poet, and businesswoman
- Ilya Zhitomirskiy (1989–2011), co-founder of Diaspora

== Chefs ==
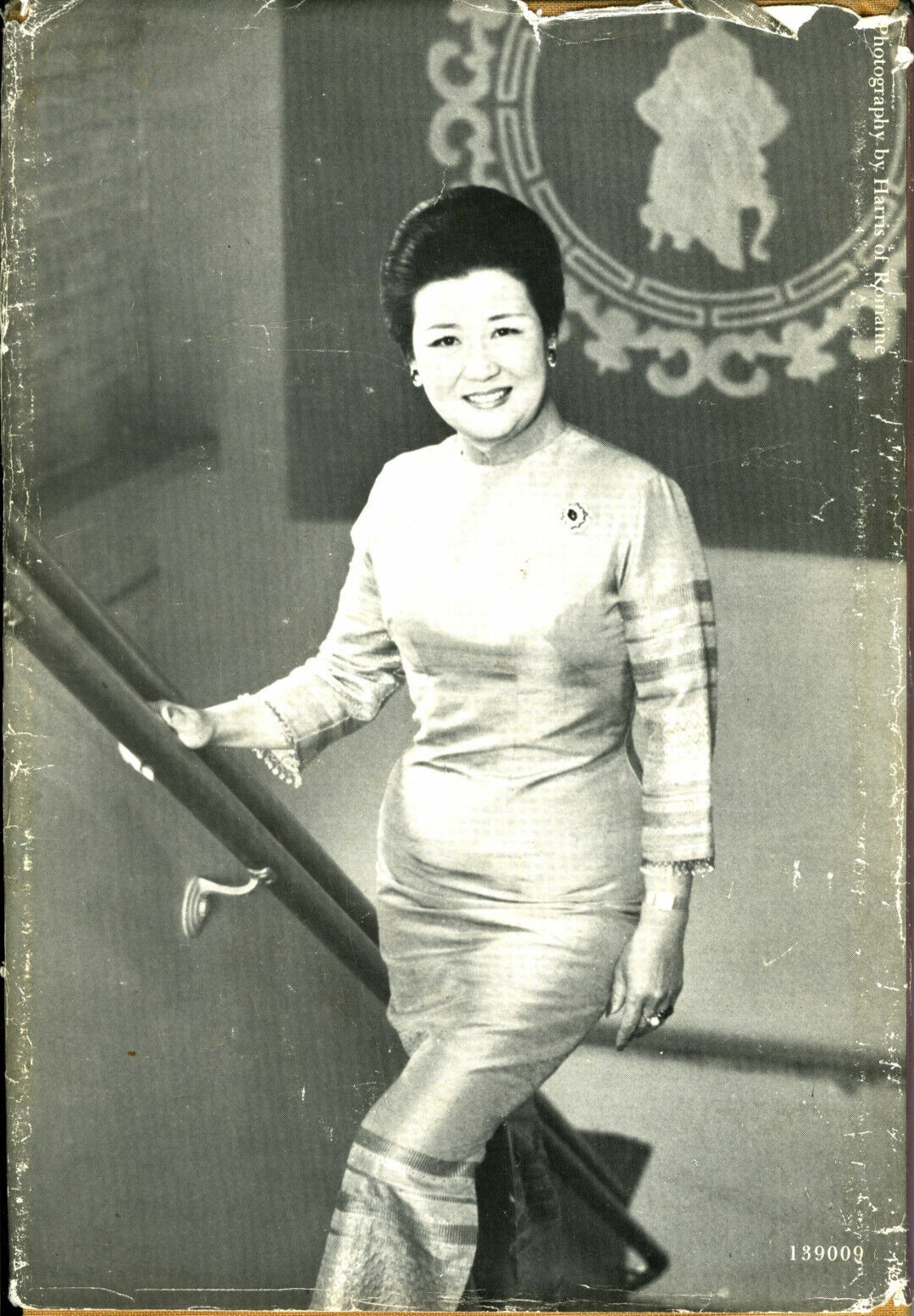
- Cecilia Chiang, restaurateur, chef, and cookbook writer
  Mario Batali (born 1960), chef
- Danny Bowien (born 1982), chef and restaurateur; founder of Mission Chinese Food
- Cecilia Chiang (1920–2020), chef, restaurateur, and cookbook writer
- Chris Cosentino, celebrity chef, restaurateur and reality television personality
- Dominique Crenn (born 1965), chef and owner of the two Michelin stars-rated Atelier Crenn and Petit Crenn in San Francisco
- Gary Danko, chef and restaurateur
- Traci Des Jardins (born 1967), chef and restaurateur, previously Jardinière
- Reed Hearon (born 1957), chef, cookbook writer, and founder of Rose Pistola
- Melissa King (born 1983), winner of Top Chef
- Corey Lee (born 1977), chef and restaurateur; founder of Benu
- George Mardikian (1903–1977), chef and restaurateur; founder of Omar Khayyam's restaurant
- Thomas McNaughton (born 1983), chef, restaurateur, and cookbook writer, Flour and Water
- Michael Mina (born 1969), chef, restaurateur
- Daniel Patterson, chef, food writer, and owner of Coi 2006–2022
- Michelle Polzine (born 1969), pastry chef and owner of 20th Century Café
- Judy Rodgers (1956–2013), chef, cookbook writer, restaurateur; founder of Zuni Cafe
- Ron Siegel, chef in San Francisco 2002–2016
- Jeremiah Tower (born 1942), chef at Chez Panisse and Stars
- Michael Tusk (born 1964), chef and owner of Quince
- René Verdon (1924–2011), chef and owner of Le Trianon 1972–1985
- Martin Yan (born 1948), television chef

== Crime ==
- David Carpenter (born 1930), also known as the Trailside Killer, a serial killer on hiking trails around the Bay Area; born and raised in San Francisco
- Raymond "Shrimp Boy" Chow (born 1959), Hong Kong-born felon with ties to a San Francisco Chinatown street gang and an organized crime syndicate
- Richard Allen Davis (born 1954), career criminal convicted of killing Polly Klaas; born and raised in San Francisco
- The Doodler, also known as the Black Doodler, unidentified serial killer believed responsible for up to 16 murders and three assaults of men in San Francisco between January 1974 and September 1975; had a habit of sketching his victims prior to their sexual encounters and slayings by stabbing
- Alice Maud Hartley (c. 1864–1907), murdered Nevada state senator Murray D. Foley by gunshot in 1894
- Jim Jones (1931–1978), cult leader of the Peoples Temple
- Leonard Lake (1945–1985), serial killer alongside his accomplice Charles Ng
- Pete McDonough (1872–1947), crime boss working alongside his brother Thomas, nicknamed the "King of the Tenderloin"
- Earle Nelson (1897–1928), serial killer and necrophile
- The Zodiac Killer, unidentified serial killer active in the 1960s

== Entertainment industry ==
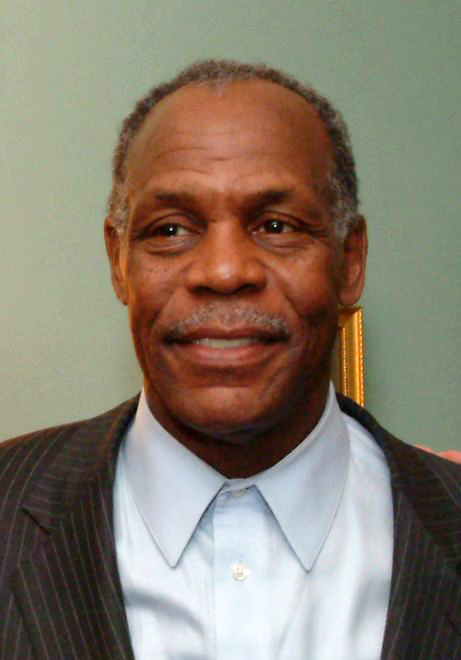
Danny Glover, actor

=== Actors ===
- Dianna Agron (born 1986), actress
- Gracie Allen (1895–1964), actress, comedian, born in San Francisco
- W. Kamau Bell (born 1973), comic, television host
- Bill Bixby (1934–1993), actor
- Joan Blackman (born 1938), actress
- Mel Blanc (1908–1989), voiceover actor
- Lisa Bonet (born 1967), actress
- Michael Bowen (born 1953), actor, son of Beat generation artist Michael Bowen (Sr.)
- Benjamin Bratt (born 1963), actor
- Todd Bridges (born 1965), actor
- Charlotte Burton (1881–1942), silent film actress, born in San Francisco
- Kari Byron (born 1974), television personality
- Colleen Camp (born 1953), actress
- Scott Capurro (born 1962), comedian, actor
- Carol Channing (1921–2019), actress
- Kevin Cheng (born 1969), actor
- Margaret Cho (born 1968), comedian, actress
- Jamie Chung (born 1983), actress
- William Collier Jr. (1902–1987), silent film and stage actor
- Darren Criss (born 1987), actor in Glee
- Eric Dane (born 1972), actor
- Dimitri Diatchenko (1968–2020), actor and musician
- Minnie Dupree (1875–1947), actress
- Clint Eastwood (born 1930), actor and film director

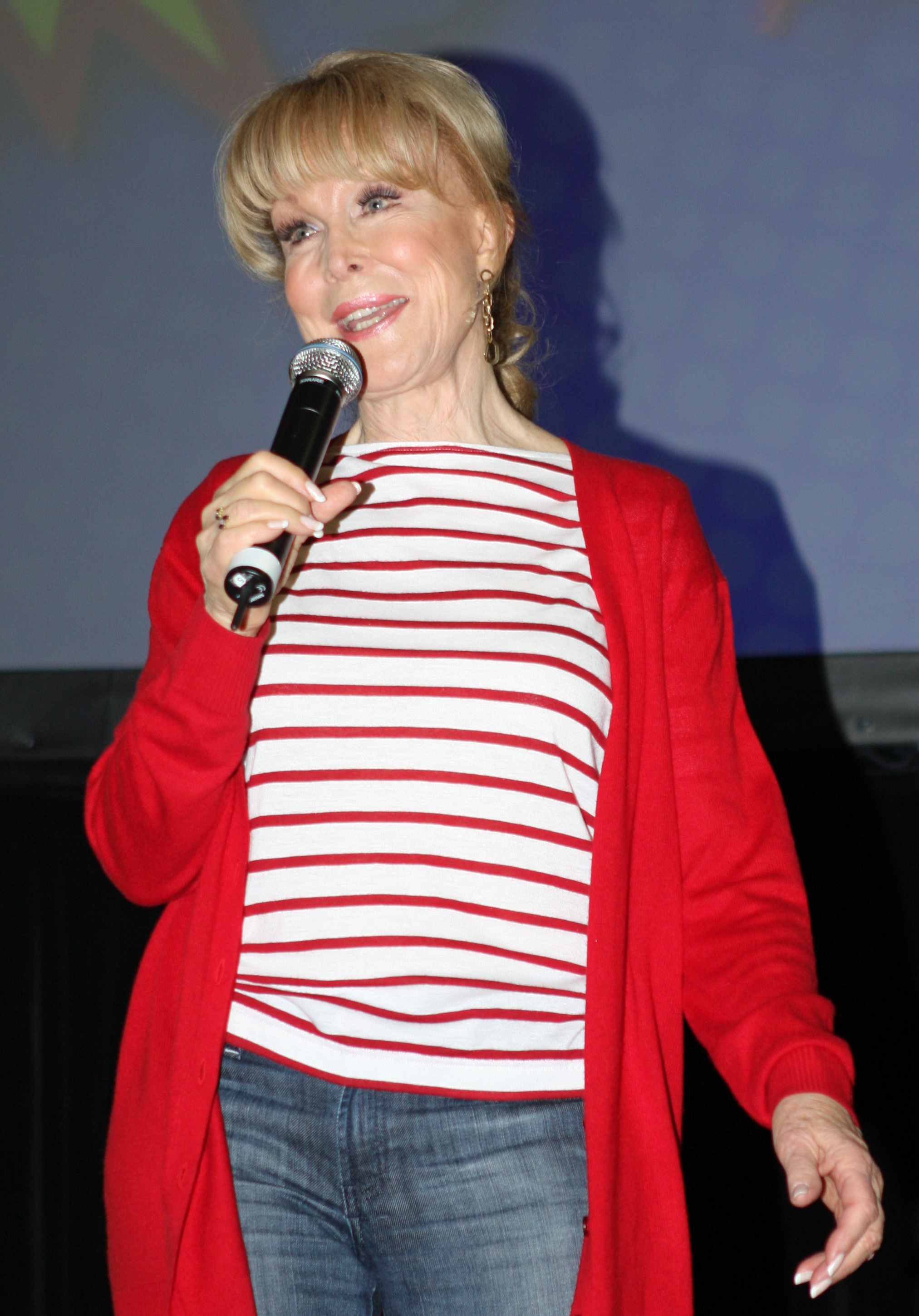
Barbara Eden, actress

- Barbara Eden (born 1931), actress
- Richard Egan (1921–1987), actor
- Jimmie Fails (born 1994), actor, screenwriter
- Danny Glover (born 1946), actor
- Jacob Hopkins (born 2002), actor
- China Kantner (born 1971), actress
- Bruce Lee (1940–1973), actor and martial artist
- Marjorie Lord (1918–2015), actress
- Cheech Marin (born 1946), actor
- Edna McClure (born c. 1888), Broadway actress
- Bridgit Mendler (born 1992), actress and singer
- Vera Michelena (1885–1961), actress, dancer and singer
- Larisa Oleynik (born 1981), actress
- Patton Oswalt (born 1969), comedian
- Kevin Pollak (born 1957), comedian, actor
- Brian Posehn (born 1966), comedian
- Paula Poundstone (born 1959), comedian and panelist on NPR's Wait, Wait...Don't Tell Me
- Rob Schneider (born 1963), actor
- Liev Schreiber (born 1967), actor
- Harry Shum Jr. (born 1982), actor
- Alicia Silverstone (born 1976), actress
- Don Spruance (born 1933), actor
- Genevieve Stebbins (1857–1934), actress, author, teacher
- Sharon Stone (born 1958), actress
- David Strathairn (born 1949), actor
- Amir Talai (born 1977), actor
- Lyle Talbot (1902–1996), actor
- Jeffrey Tambor (born 1944), actor
- Phillip Terry (1909–1993), actor
- Gregg Turkington (born 1967), a.k.a. Neil Hamburger
- Aisha Tyler (born 1970), actress and TV personality
- Stuart Whitman (1928–2020), actor
- Robin Williams (1951–2014), comedian, actor
- Ali Wong (born 1982), actress, comic, writer
- BD Wong (born 1960), actor
- Natalie Wood (1938–1981), actress

=== Dancers ===
- Carol Doda (1937–2015), first public topless dancer
- Isadora Duncan (1877–1927), "mother" of modern dance
- Margaret Jenkins (born 1942), choreographer

=== Filmmakers ===
- Chris Columbus (born 1958), director
- Francis Ford Coppola (born 1939), film director, writer, producer, winery owner, San Francisco restaurateur
- Sofia Coppola (born 1971), director
- Delmer Daves (1904–1977), director
- David Fincher (born 1962), director
- Joshua Grannell (born 1974), director
- Sarah Jacobson (1971–2004), film director, screenwriter, and producer
- Philip Kaufman (born 1936), film director
- George Kuchar (1942–2011), underground film director and video artist, known for his "low-fi" aesthetic
- Mervyn LeRoy (1900–1987), director, producer, actor
- George Lucas (born 1944), director and producer
- Andy Luckey (born 1965), TV writer, producer, director
- Mary Eunice McCarthy (1899–1969), screenwriter, playwright, and author
- H.P. Mendoza (born 1977), writer-director, musician
- The Mitchell brothers, Jim and Artie, adult industry pioneers including adult cinema and adult film production
- Jon Moritsugu (born 1965), cult-underground filmmaker
- Jenni Olson (born 1962), film curator, filmmaker, author, and LGBT film historian
- Lourdes Portillo (born 1944), screenwriter and filmmaker
- Walter Shenson (1919–2000), film producer
- Cauleen Smith (born 1967), filmmaker and multimedia artist
- Joe Talbot (born 1991), director
- Wayne Wang (born 1949), director
- Jay Ward (1920–1989), creator and producer of animated TV series
- Tommy Wiseau, director of the cult film The Room

=== Promoters and managers ===
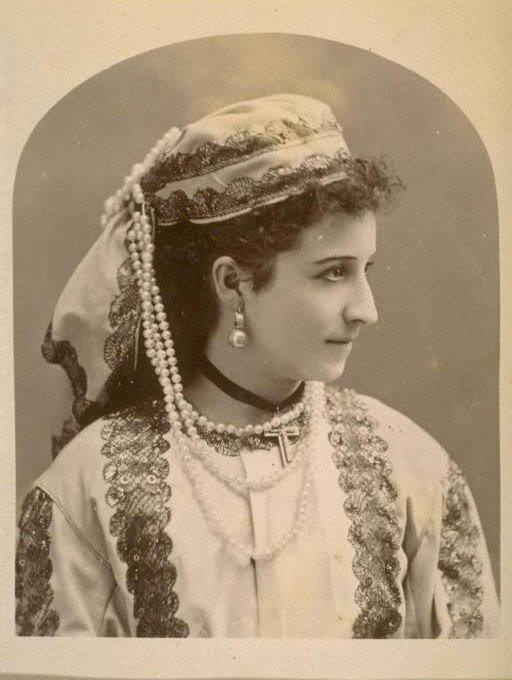
Alice Oates, theatre manager and pioneer of American musical theatre

- Bill Graham (1931–1991), rock promoter, known for Winterland Ballroom, The Fillmore, Fillmore West and Bill Graham Presents
- Chet Helms (1942–2005), 1960s rock promoter
- Rock Scully (1941–2014), manager of the Grateful Dead

=== Theatre ===
- David Belasco (1853–1931), theatrical producer, impresario, director and playwright, born in San Francisco
- Darren Criss (born 1987), Broadway actor, singer and songwriter, born in San Francisco
- Alice Oates (1849–1887), actress and pioneer of American musical theatre, lived and worked in San Francisco
- Carole Shorenstein Hays (born 1948), theatrical producer and owner of Curran Theatre

== Military ==
- James Millikin Bevans (1899–1977), U.S. Air Force general
- John W. Bowen, U.S. Army lieutenant general
- Charles M. Bundel (1875–1941), US Army brigadier general
- Daniel Callaghan (1890–1942), U.S. navy admiral and Medal of Honor recipient
- Richard Comba (1837–1907), US Army brigadier general; raised and educated in Ireland and immigrated to the United States in 1854
- Kenneth J. Houghton (1920–2006), U.S. Marine Corps general and Navy Cross recipient
- William Payne Jackson (1868–1945), U.S. Army major general
- William Harrington Leahy (1904–1986), U.S. Navy admiral
- Robert Houston Noble, U.S. Army general
- G. S. Patrick (1907–1999), U.S. Navy admiral and Navy Cross recipient
- Thomas Selfridge (1882–1908), U.S. Army first lieutenant, aviator, first person to die in a plane crash
- William T. Shorey (1859–1919), first black San Francisco sea captain
- William Renwick Smedberg Jr., U.S. Army general
- Arthur Wolcott Yates, U.S. Army general
- John C. Young (1912–1987), U.S. Army officer, Chinatown leader
- Elmo R. Zumwalt Jr. (1920–2000), U.S. Navy admiral

== Musicians and bands ==
- 11/5, rap group
- 4 Non Blondes, rock band
- 8 Legged Monster, Jazz band based in San Francisco
- A.B. Skhy, 1960s blues-rock band
- The Ace of Cups, 1960s rock band
- The Aislers Set, indie rock band
- American Music Club, indie rock band
- Lorin Ashton a.k.a. Bassnectar (born 1978), DJ and record producer
- Avengers, punk band
  - Penelope Houston (born 1958), singer
- Marty Balin (1949–2018), singer Jefferson Airplane
- The Beau Brummels (1960s), rock band, signature song "I Left My Heart in San Francisco"
- Jello Biafra (born 1958), singer for Dead Kennedys
- Kat Bjelland (born 1963), bassist for Babes in Toyland
- Black Pearl, 1960s/1970s rock band
- Blue Cheer, early hard rock band
- Mike Bordin (born 1962), drummer for Faith No More and Ozzy Osbourne
- Paul Bostaph (born 1964), heavy metal drummer
- Mike Burkett a.k.a. "Fat Mike" (born 1967), bassist/songwriter for NOFX
- Kevin Cadogan (born 1970), guitarist, known for his work with the band Third Eye Blind on the albums Third Eye Blind and Blue* Jim Campilongo (born 1958), guitarist
- Michael Carabello (born 1947), percussionist with Santana
- Vanessa Carlton (born 1980), singer
- Caroliner, experimental band
- Adam Carson (born 1974), drummer for AFI
- Jack Casady (born 1944), bassist for Jefferson Airplane and Hot Tuna
- Tracy Chapman (born 1964), singer-songwriter
- Craig Chaquico (born 1954), rock, jazz and new age guitarist
- The Charlatans, folk rock and psychedelic rock band
- Chrome, foundational industrial rock band
- Todd Tamanend Clark (born 1952), poet and composer
- Clown Alley, punk band
- Consolidated, alternative dance/industrial music band
- Jack Conte, songwriter, multi-instrumentalist, half of the musical duo Pomplamoose, and CEO of Patreon
- Counting Crows, alternative rock band
- Patrick Cowley (1950–1982), disco composer
- Helios Creed (born 1953), singer/songwriter
- Creeper Lagoon, rock band
- Crime, early punk band
- Cypher in the Snow, queercore band
- Dead Kennedys, punk band
- Paul Desmond (1924–1977), jazz saxophonist
- The Dicks, early punk band
- Dave Dictor (born 1951), founder and singer of MDC
- Dieselhed, country punk band
- The Dils, early punk band
- Dominant Legs, indie pop group
- Jane Dornacker (1947–1986), songwriter for The Tubes, lead vocalist of Leila and the Snakes (originally from Albuquerque, New Mexico)
- The Dwarves, punk band
- John Dwyer (born 1974), multi-instrumentalist, vocalist, songwriter
- Mark Eitzel (born 1959), musician
- Hanni El Khatib (born 1981), a blues rock artist born in San Francisco, currently based in Los Angeles
- Erase Errata, post-punk band
- Faith No More, rock band
- Maude Fay (1878–1964), operatic dramatic soprano
- Flamin' Groovies, rock band
- Flipper, early punk band
- Michael Franti (born 1967), singer/songwriter
- Bobby Freeman (1940–2017), rock, soul, and R&B singer and producer
- Frightwig, punk band
- The Fucking Champs, progressive punk band
- Girls, rock band
- Billy Gould (born 1963), bass guitarist for Faith No More
- Grass Widow, indie punk band
- Grateful Dead, rock band
  - Tom Constanten (born 1944), keyboardist for Grateful Dead
  - Jerry Garcia (1942–1995), psychedelic and folk-rock guitarist and singer for Grateful Dead
  - Mickey Hart (born 1943), drummer for Grateful Dead
  - Bill Kreutzmann (born 1946), drummer for Grateful Dead
  - Phil Lesh (born 1949), bassist for Grateful Dead
  - Ron "Pigpen" McKernan (1949–1973), keyboardist and founding member of Grateful Dead
  - Bob Weir (born 1947), songwriter/guitarist for Grateful Dead
- Ryan Greene, record producer and sound engineer
- Grotus, industrial rock band
- Vince Guaraldi (1928–1976), jazz musician and pianist, born in San Francisco
- Sammy Hagar (born 1947), singer for Montrose and Van Halen
- Henry's Dress, indie pop band
- Cindy Herron (born 1961), R&B singer in EnVogue, born in San Francisco
- Hickey, punk band
- Gary Holt (born 1964), thrash metal guitarist for Exodus
- Tiffany Hwang (born 1989), member of pop group Girls' Generation
- I Am Spoonbender, band
- Imperial Teen, rock band
- Chris Isaak (born 1956), singer and musician
- J Church, punk band
- Etta James (1938–2012), blues/R&B/soul icon
- Jawbreaker, punk/emo band
  - Blake Schwarzenbach (born 1967), singer, songwriter and guitarist for Jawbreaker and Jets to Brazil
- Jefferson Airplane, rock band
- Jefferson Starship, rock band
- Stephan Jenkins (born 1964), singer/songwriter for Third Eye Blind
- Janis Joplin (1943–1970), rock singer
- Journey, rock band
- Jessica Jung (born 1989), former member of pop group Girls' Generation
- John Kahn (1947–1996), bassist for Jerry Garcia Band
- Paul Kantner (1941–2016), rock musician and co-founder of the band Jefferson Airplane
- Jorma Kaukonen (born 1940), guitarist for Jefferson Airplane and Hot Tuna
- Mark Kozelek (born 1967), singer/songwriter, Red House Painters and solo
- Kreayshawn (born 1989), rapper
- Kronos Quartet, classical ensemble
- Krystal Jung (born 1994), member of pop group f(x)
- Jay Lane (born 1964), drummer, RatDog, Furthur, Primus, Les Claypool's Frog Brigade, Sausage, The Uptones
- Maxime Le Forestier (born 1949), French singer/songwriter
- CoCo Lee (1975–2023), CantoPop singer and actress
- Huey Lewis (born 1950), Lead singer for Huey Lewis and the News
- The Little Deaths, rock band
- Courtney Love (born 1964), singer and actress
- Bamboo Mañalac (born 1978), rock singer, former lead vocals for Rivermaya and Bamboo, coach of The Voice Philippines
- Tony Martin (1913–2012), actor and popular singer
- Mates of State, indie-pop duo
- Dmitri Matheny (born 1965), jazz flugelhornist
- Johnny Mathis (born 1935), pop singer
- Bobby McFerrin (born 1950), singer/songwriter
- Kirke Mechem (born 1925), composer
- Eric Melvin (born 1966), guitarist for NOFX
- Melvins, band
- The Mermen, surf-rock band
- Metal Church, heavy metal band
- Metallica, heavy metal band
  - Cliff Burton (1962–1986), bass guitarist for thrash metal band Metallica
  - Kirk Hammett (born 1962), lead guitarist for thrash metal band Metallica
  - Lars Ulrich (born 1963), drummer for thrash metal band Metallica
- Adi Meyerson (born 1991), jazz bassist
- Milk Cult, electronic band
- Moby, electronic music artist
- Moby Grape, rock band
- The Mojo Men, 1960s rock band
- Chante Moore (born 1967), R&B and jazz singer
- Bob Mould (born 1960), singer/guitarist, Hüsker Dü, Sugar
- The Mummies, garage rock band
- Stuart Murdoch (born 1968), singer/songwriter, Belle & Sebastian
- The Mutants, early punk band
- The Mystery Trend, 1960s garage rock band
- Dan Nakamura a.k.a. Dan the Automator (born 1966), hip hop producer
- Graham Nash (born 1942), singer, songwriter and guitarist for Crosby, Stills, Nash & Young and The Hollies
- Matt Nathanson (born 1973), singer/musician
- Negative Trend, punk band
- New Riders of the Purple Sage, rock band
- Andre Nickatina (born 1970), rapper
- The Nuns, punk band
- The Offs, punk band
- The Oh Sees, garage rock band
- The Ophelias, psychedelic rock band
- Bill Orcutt (born 1962), guitarist and composer
- Buzz Osborne (born 1964), singer/songwriter/guitarist with The Melvins
- Christopher Owens (born 1979), singer, songwriter
- Pablo Cruise, pop/rock band
- Pagan Babies, rock band
- Pansy Division, punk band
- Mike Patton (born 1968), singer for Faith No More
- Linda Perry, lead singer of 4 Non Blondes
- Faith Petric (1915–2013), folk singer
- Leviticus Lyon (1894–1958), tenor vocalist, stage director
- Liz Phair (born 1967), singer/songwriter
- Polkacide, punk-polka band
- Quicksilver Messenger Service, rock band
- Rappin' 4-Tay (Anthony Forte, born 1968), rapper
- RBL Posse, rap group
- Red House Painters, rock band
- The Residents, avant-garde music and visual arts group
- Linda Ronstadt (born 1946), singer
- Arthur Russell (1951–1992), cellist, composer, producer, singer
- Doug Sahm (1941–1999), singer-songwriter
- Esa-Pekka Salonen (born 1958), Finnish orchestral conductor, composer, music director-designate of the San Francisco Symphony
- San Quinn (born 1977), rapper, raised in the Western Addition, a neighborhood of San Francisco
- Santana, rock band
- Carlos Santana (born 1947), rock, blues, salsa guitarist and singer
- Boz Scaggs (born 1944), singer, songwriter, guitarist
- Ty Segall (born 1987), musician
- Deke Sharon (born 1967), a cappella singer The House Jacks
- Virgil Shaw, singer-songwriter, member of Brent's TV and Dieselhed
- Michael Shrieve (born 1949), drummer for Santana
- Sic Alps, garage rock band
- Sir Douglas Quintet, rock band
- Sister Double Happiness, punk band
- Skrillex (born Sonny John Moore, 1988), electronic producer, DJ, musician
- Grace Slick (born 1939), singer for Jefferson Airplane
- Miriam Solovieff (1921–2004), classical violinist and pianist
- Sopwith Camel, 1960s psychedelic rock band
- Martin Sorrondeguy (born 1967), singer for Los Crudos and Limp Wrist, founder of Lengua Armada Discos
- Skip Spence (1946–1999), singer-songwriter, and member of Jefferson Airplane, Quicksilver Messenger Service, and Moby Grape
- Steel Pole Bath Tub, noise-punk band
- Steve Miller Band, rock band
- The Stone Foxes, rock band
- Sly Stone (born 1943), funk icon
- Sun Kil Moon, folk rock band
- Swingin' Utters, street punk band
- Sylvester (1947–1988), disco singer and performer
- Third Eye Blind, alt-rock band
- Michael Tilson Thomas (born 1944), conductor
- Those Darn Accordions, accordion band
- Tribe 8, queercore punk band
- The Tubes, new wave/punk band
- Two Gallants, guitar/drum duo
- Ross Valory (born 1949), bass player for many bands, most notably Journey
- John Vanderslice (born 1967), musician, songwriter, and recording engineer
- Sid Vicious (1957–1979), bassist for Sex Pistols
- Von Iva, electro soul-punk band
- Martha Wash (born 1953), R&B, Soul, and pop singer
- Rob Wasserman (1952–2016), composer and bass player
- George Watsky (born 1986), hip hop artist
- Linda Watson (born 1960), dramatic soprano and academic voice teacher
- We Five, 1960s folk rock group
- White Trash Debutantes, punk band
- Kevin Woo (born 1991), member of Korean boygroup U-Kiss

== News and commentary ==
- Ambrose Bierce (1842–1913), journalist
- Ben Blank (1921–2009), television graphics innovator
- Phil Bronstein (born 1950), editor of San Francisco Chronicle and San Francisco Examiner
- Herb Caen (1916–1997), newspaper columnist
- Tucker Carlson (born 1969), conservative political commentator for Fox News
- Ben Fong-Torres (born 1945), journalist, best known for work with Rolling Stone
- C.H. Garrigues (1902–1974), jazz reviewer
- William Randolph Hearst (1863–1951), newspaper magnate and publisher
- Gregg Jarrett (born 1955), news commentator with Fox News
- Whit Johnson (born 1982), journalist
- Lewis Lapham (born 1935), editor of Harper's
- Jake Phelps (1962–2019), editor-in-chief of Thrasher Magazine
- Michael Savage (born 1942), radio personality and conservative political commentator
- Randy Shilts (1951–1994), pioneering gay journalist at San Francisco Chronicle and author of And the Band Played On, The Mayor of Castro Street and Conduct Unbecoming
- Lincoln Steffens (1866–1936), journalist
- Kara Swisher (born 1962), technology journalist, New York Times writer, and co-founder of Recode and All Things Digital
- David Talbot (born 1951), creator of Salon.com, journalist
- Stephen Talbot (born 1949), reporter, producer, KQED and PBS' Frontline
- Jann Wenner (born 1946), Rolling Stone founder
- Tim Yohannan (1945–1998), founder of MaximumRockNRoll and 924 Gilman Street

== Political figures, activists and civil servants ==
- Robert Ackerman, Oregon state legislator born in San Francisco
- Jeff Adachi (1959–2019), San Francisco public defender
- Jewett W. Adams (1835–1920), fourth governor of Nevada; resident of San Francisco
- Art Agnos (born 1938), 38th mayor of San Francisco
- Beya Alcaraz (born 1996), member of the San Francisco Board of Supervisors
- Tom Ammiano (born 1941), California state assemblyman, San Francisco supervisor, mayoral candidate and LGBT rights activist
- Luis Antonio Argüello (1784–1830), first governor of Alta California
- John Perry Barlow (1948–2018), poet and essayist, cyberlibertarian political activist, Grateful Dead lyricist, and founding member of the Electronic Frontier Foundation and the Freedom of the Press Foundation
- London Breed (born 1974), mayor of San Francisco (2017–)
- Stephen Breyer (born 1938), former United States Supreme Court associate justice
- Jerry Brown (born 1938), former governor of California, former governor of California, former mayor of Oakland, former California Attorney General
- Pat Brown (1905–1996), governor of California
- Willie Brown (born 1934), mayor of San Francisco, 1996–2004, speaker of the California State Assembly, 1980–1995
- Christopher Augustine Buckley ("Blind Boss" Buckley, 1845–1922), Democratic Party boss
- Wayne M. Collins (1899–1974), civil rights attorney
- Belle Cora (Arabella Ryan) (1827–1862), Madam of the Barbary Coast, Vigilance Committee
- Bobby Farlice-Rubio, Vermont state legislator
- Ben Fee (1908), Chinese activist in San Francisco's Chinatown
- Dianne Feinstein (1933–2023), San Francisco's first female mayor (1978–1988) and U.S. senator for California
- Sandra Lee Fewer (born 1956/57), San Francisco supervisor
- Joseph Flores (1900–1981), governor of Guam
- John Gilmore (born 1955), co-founder of the Electronic Frontier Foundation, the Cypherpunks mailing list, and Cygnus Solutions; creator of the alt.* hierarchy in Usenet; major contributor to the GNU Project
- C.J. Goodell (1885–1967), associate justice, California Court of Appeals (1945–1953)
- Terence Hallinan (1936–2020), San Francisco supervisor and district attorney
- Matt Haney (born 1982), San Francisco supervisor
- Peter D. Hannaford (1932–2015), aide to Ronald Reagan; author, public relations consultant
- Kamala D. Harris (born 1964), San Francisco District Attorney (2004–2011), Attorney General of California (2011–2017), U.S. Senator from California (2017–2021), vice president of the United States (2021–)
- George Hearst (1820–1891), politician
- Frank Jordan (born 1935), police chief and former mayor of San Francisco
- Ed Lee (1952–2017), mayor of San Francisco
- Mark Leno (born 1951), California state senator, former San Francisco supervisor, and mayoral candidate
- Monica Lewinsky (born 1973), activist and former White House intern, born in San Francisco
- Rafael Mandelman, San Francisco supervisor
- Gordon Mar, San Francisco supervisor
- Del Martin and Phyllis Lyon, activists, first same-sex couple to get a marriage license in San Francisco
- Robert McNamara (1916–2009), Secretary of Defense and CEO of Ford Motor Company
- Harvey Milk (1930–1978), city supervisor of San Francisco, gay icon
- George Moscone (1929–1978), attorney and Democratic politician, 37th mayor of San Francisco (1976–1978), "the people's mayor," California State Senator and majority leader (1967–1976)
- Gavin Newsom (born 1967), current governor of California, former mayor of San Francisco and lieutenant governor of California
- José de Jesús Noé (1805–1862), the last alcalde of Yerba Buena, which became San Francisco after the Mexican–American War
- Michael O'Shaughnessy (1864–1934), civil engineer; city engineer for the city of San Francisco during the first part of the twentieth century; developed the Hetch-Hetchy water system
- Nancy Pelosi (born 1940), congresswoman, former speaker of the U.S. House of Representatives (2007–2011, 2019–2023)
- Aaron Peskin (born 1964), San Francisco supervisor
- James Duval Phelan (1861–1930), civic leader and banker; mayor of San Francisco 1897–1902; U.S. senator 1915–1921; central to effort to bring Hetch Hetchy and municipal water to San Francisco
- Dean Preston (born 1969/70), San Francisco supervisor
- Anthony Ribera (born 1945), chief of San Francisco police department
- James Rolph Jr. (1869–1934), 27th governor of California; 30th (and longest-serving) mayor of San Francisco
- Hillary Ronen, San Francisco supervisor
- John Roos (born 1955), former United States Ambassador to Japan under Barack Obama, technology attorney, and CEO of Silicon Valley-based law firm of Wilson Sonsini Goodrich & Rosati
- Angelo Rossi (1878–1948), 31st mayor of San Francisco
- Ahsha Safaí (born 1973), San Francisco supervisor
- Helen P. Sanborn (1858–1922), president, San Francisco Board of Education
- Tony Serra (born 1934), criminal defense and civil rights attorney, political activist and tax resister, grew up in the Outer Sunset district and has practiced law in San Francisco for years
- Charlotte Mailliard Shultz (born 1933), chief of Protocol, trustee of San Francisco War Memorial and Performing Arts Center, widow of George Shultz
- George P. Shultz (1920–1933), Secretary of State under Ronald Reagan and Secretary of the Treasury, Secretary of Labor and Director of the Office of Management and Budget under Richard Nixon
- Lateefah Simon (born 1977), U.S. representative
- Theresa Sparks (born 1949), activist, former president of the San Francisco Police Commission, business woman
- Catherine Stefani (born 1969), San Francisco supervisor
- Maluseu Doris Tulifau (born c.1991), Samoan American human rights activist
- Shamann Walton, San Francisco supervisor
- Edgar Wayburn (1906–2010), environmentalist, five-time president of the Sierra Club
- Caspar Weinberger (1917–2006), secretary of defense
- Cecil Williams (1929–2024), pastor and community leader
- Norman Yee (born 1949), San Francisco supervisor

== Scientists ==
- Augustus Jesse Bowie Jr. (1872–1955), technology engineer, inventor and entrepreneur
- Mary E. Clark (1927–2019), biologist, professor, Fellow of the American Association for the Advancement of Science
- Peter Eckersley (1979–2022), computer scientist, computer security researcher, and activist
- Paul Ekman (born 1934), pioneer in the study of emotions and their relation to facial expressions
- Laura J. Esserman, surgeon and breast cancer oncology specialist at the University of California, San Francisco School of Medicine
- Dian Fossey (1932–1985), primatologist, researcher and animal advocate
- Clifford Geertz (1926–2006), anthropologist
- Eugene Gu (born 1986), doctor and CEO of Ganogen Research Institute Also a news media writer, born in San Francisco
- Mary Halton (1879–1948), suffragist, doctor and early IUD researcher;first women appointed to the Harvard Medical School faculty; born and raised in San Francisco
- Stephen Herrero, biologist, bear expert, professor at University of Calgary
- Daniel Levitin (born 1957), cognitive psychologist, neuroscientist, writer, musician, and record producer
- Gabriel L. Plaa (1930–2009), toxicologist
- Mervyn Silverman, physician and public health supervisor of San Francisco during the city's initial response to the AIDS crisis
- Kazue Togasaki (1897–1992), Japanese woman who served as a medical doctor in Japanese internment camps
- Paul Volberding, physician known for his pioneering work in treating persons with HIV
- Robert Wartenberg (1887–1956), neurologist and clinical professor of neurology at the University of California
- John W. Young (1930–2018), astronaut, ninth person to walk on the Moon

== Socialites ==
- Marian and Vivian Brown (1927–2013, 2014), identical twin socialites and locally known San Francisco personalities
- Abigail Folger (1943–1969), Folgers coffee heiress and victim of the Tate murders
- Gordon Getty (born 1933), heir to oil tycoon J. Paul Getty, philanthropists, classical music composer, business man, born and raised in San Francisco
- Charlotte Mailliard Shultz (born 1933), philanthropist, socialite
- Tabe Slioor (1926–2006), socialite, news reporter, photojournalist
- Noël Sullivan (1890–1956), concert singer, philanthropist and patron of the arts, born and raised in San Francisco

== Writers ==
- Maya Angelou (1928–2014), poet
- Mary Therese Austin (d. 1889), theater critic
- Julian Bagley (1892–1981), author, veteran and hotel concierge
- William Bayer (born 1939), crime fiction writer
- David Belasco (1853–1931), playwright
- Ambrose Bierce (1842 – c. 1914), journalist and author
- Clark Blaise (born 1940), Canadian author
- Richard Brautigan (1935–1984), poet, writer
- Carrie Carlton (1834–1868), mid-19th-century poet, writer, journalist
- Neal Cassady (1926–1968), beatnik poet, husband of Carolyn Cassady
- Carolyn Cassady (1923–2013), writer, wife of Neal Cassady
- Eli Coppola (1961–2000), poet and spoken word performer
- Diane di Prima (1934–2020), poet
- Greg Downs (born 1971), short-story writer
- Robert Duncan (1919–1988), poet
- Dave Eggers (born 1970), author
- Jeffrey Eugenides (born 1960), author
- Marcus Ewert (born 1972), writer, actor, and director
- Stephen Fender (1936–2026), writer
- Lawrence Ferlinghetti (1919–2021), poet, co-founder of City Lights Bookstore
- Robert Frost (1874–1963), iconic poet
- Adam Gidwitz (born 1982), children's book author
- Allen Ginsberg (1926–1997), iconic poet of the beat generation
- Clay Meredith Greene (1850–1933), playwright, director, actor
- Thom Gunn (1929–2004), poet
- Dashiell Hammett (1894–1961), author of hard-boiled detective novels
- Daniel Handler (born 1970), better known as Lemony Snicket
- Jack Hirschman (1933–2021), poet
- George Hitchcock (1914–2010), poet, playwright, actor, professor, editor of the San Francisco–based Kayak poetry journal, lived in San Francisco 1958–1970
- Robert Hunter (1941–2019), Grateful Dead lyricist
- Shirley Jackson (1916–1965), author
- Alan Kaufman (born 1952), author, poet, editor
- Bob Kaufman (1925–1986), poet
- Joanne Kyger, 1934–2017, poet, writer
- Philip Lamantia (1927–2005), poet
- Gus Lee (born 1946), Asian-American author
- Daniel Levitin (born 1957), writer, scientist, musician
- Ron Loewinsohn (1937–2014), poet, novelist
- Jack London (1876–1916), writer
- Ki Longfellow (born 1944), writer
- Devorah Major (active since 1990s), poet, novelist
- Armistead Maupin (born 1944), writer
- Florence Percy McIntyre (1855–1923), short story writer, journalist, and clubwoman
- Midori, author and sex educator

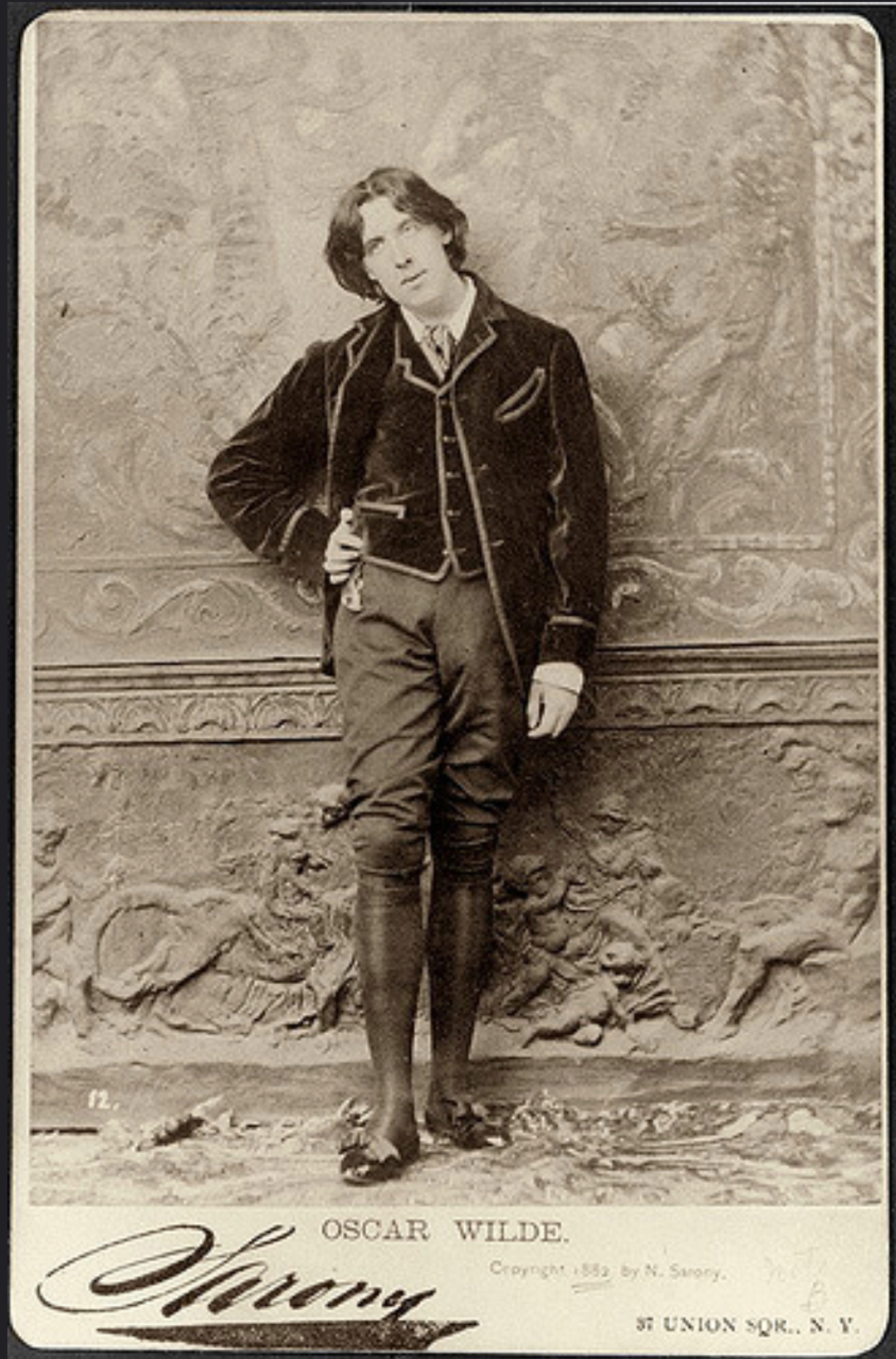
Oscar Wilde, author and playwright

- Carol Anne O'Marie (1933–2009), Roman Catholic nun, mystery writer
- Emelie Tracy Y. Swett Parkhurst (1863–1892), poet and author
- Charles Plymell (born 1935), poet, novelist, and small press publisher
- Kenneth Rexroth (1905–1982), poet
- Anne Rice (1941–2021), author
- Gary Snyder (born 1930), poet of the beat generation
- Rebecca Solnit (born 1961), writer
- Lorenzo Sosso (1867–1965), Italian-American poet
- Jack Spicer (1925–1965), poet of the beat generation, lived in the 1950s and 1960s in San Francisco and died in San Francisco
- Joseph Staten, writer (Halo: Contact Harvest)
- Danielle Steel (born 1947), author
- Dale J. Stephens, author
- Robert Louis Stevenson (1850–1894), author, lived in San Francisco 1879–1880
- Amy Tan (born 1952), author
- Michelle Tea (born 1971), author, poet, editor
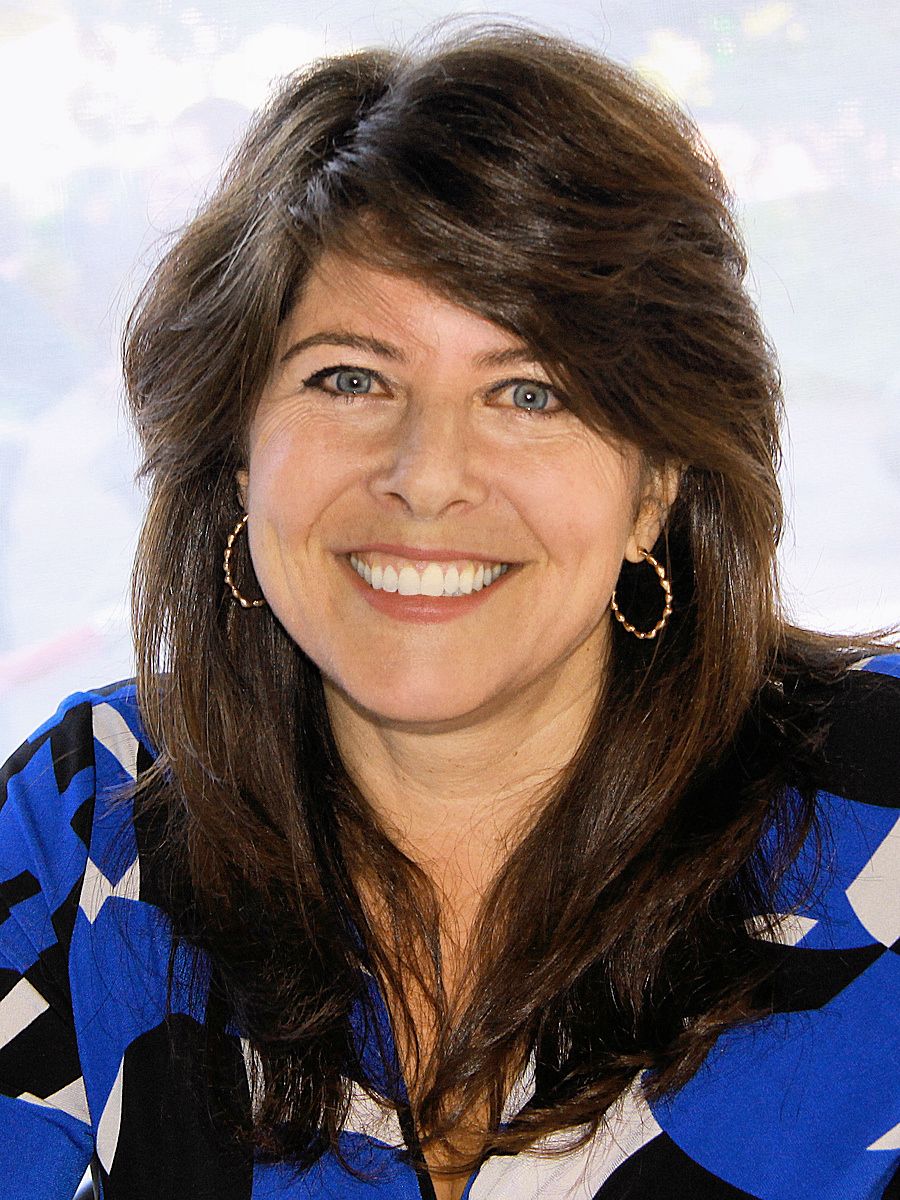
- Naomi Wolf, feminist author
  Walter Tevis (1928–1994), author, The Hustler
- Robert Alfred Theobald (1884–1957), US Navy rear admiral, author of The Final Secret of Pearl Harbor
- M. B. M. Toland (1925–1895), poet, social leader
- Alice B. Toklas (1877–1967), cookbook author, partner of Gertrude Stein, born and lived in San Francisco
- Mark Twain (1835–1910), author
- Vendela Vida (born 1971), writer
- Madge Morris Wagner (1862–1924), poet and journalist
- Lew Welch (1926 – disappeared 1971), poet
- Philip Whalen (1923–2002), poet
- Oscar Wilde (1854–1900), author and playwright, spent 1882 in San Francisco and is commemorated in the Castro's Rainbow Honor Walk
- Emma Wolf (1865–1932), novelist, lived in San Francisco her entire life
- Naomi Wolf (born 1962), writer
- Curtis Yarvin (born 1973), political theorist and computer scientist
- Laurence Yep (born 1948), Asian-American writer
- Helen Zia (born 1952), writer, journalist, and activist

== Other ==
- Michael A. Aquino (1946–2019), political scientist, military officer, Satanist, and founder of the Temple of Set
- Brace Belden (born 1989), columnist, militiaman, union organizer, Twitter personality
- Dario Amodei (born 1983), artificial intelligence researcher and the CEO of Anthropic
- Charles L. Biedenbach (1865–1942), teacher, advocate of junior high schools
- Maciej Cegłowski (born 1975), web developer, entrepreneur, speaker, and social critic
- Thomas E. Horn (born 1946), attorney, philanthropist, publisher of Bay Area Reporter, trustee of San Francisco War Memorial and Performing Arts Center
- Laurene Powell Jobs (born 1963), widow of Steve Jobs, founder of Emerson Collective
- Anton LaVey (1930–1997), founder of the Church of Satan, author, musician and occultist, lived and died in San Francisco
- Douglas MacAgy (1913–1973), Canadian-born American curator, academic administrator; former curator of the San Francisco Museum of Art
- Jermayne MacAgy (1914–1964), art historian, curator, and museum director; worked at the California Palace of the Legion of Honor
- Madame Moustache (born Eleanor Dumont; 1829–1879), Gold Rush-era professional card dealer and gambler
- Emperor Norton (1818–1880), Gold Rush entrepreneur, eccentric, egalitarian and original visionary of the San Francisco-Oakland Bay Bridge
- Maria Seise, first Chinese woman to immigrate to California
- Owsley Stanley (1935–2011), audio engineer and clandestine chemist
- Tye Leung Schulze (1887–1972), interpreter and first Chinese-American woman to vote in a US primary election
- Jacob Weisman (born 1965), publisher of Tachyon Publications, editor

== See also ==
- List of people from Berkeley, California
- List of people from Oakland, California
- List of people from Palo Alto
- List of people from San Jose, California
- List of people from Santa Cruz, California
