= Bendixen =

Bendixen is a surname. Notable people with the surname include:

- Aage Bendixen (1887–1973), Danish actor
- Alfred Bendixen, American literatary scholar
- Fanny Bendixen (c. 1820 – 1899), Canadian gold-rush hotelier
- Finn Bendixen (born 1949), Norwegian long-jumper
- Friedrich Bendixen (1864–1920), German banker
- Harry Bendixen (1901–1954), Danish footballer and journalist
- Niclas Bendixen (born 1972), Danish theatre director
- Ole Bendixen (1869–1958), Danish explorer
- Ole Christian Bendixen (born 1947), Norwegian sailor
- Ulla Bendixen, Danish folktronic musician
