= Fimrite =

Fimrite is a surname. Notable people with the surname include:

- Adolph Fimrite (1913–1990), Canadian politician
- Ron Fimrite (1931–2010), American humorist, historian, sportswriter, and author
