= Hearon =

Hearon is a surname. Notable people with the surname include:

- Caleb Hearon (born 1995), American comedian, writer, and actor
- Reed Hearon (born 1957), American chef
- Shelby Hearon (1931–2016), American writer
- Steve Hearon (born 1953), American professional boxer and convicted serial killer
- Todd Hearon (born 1968), American poet
