= Washington Square Bar and Grill =

San Francisco restaurant

Coordinates: 37°48′1.62″N 122°24′39.46″W

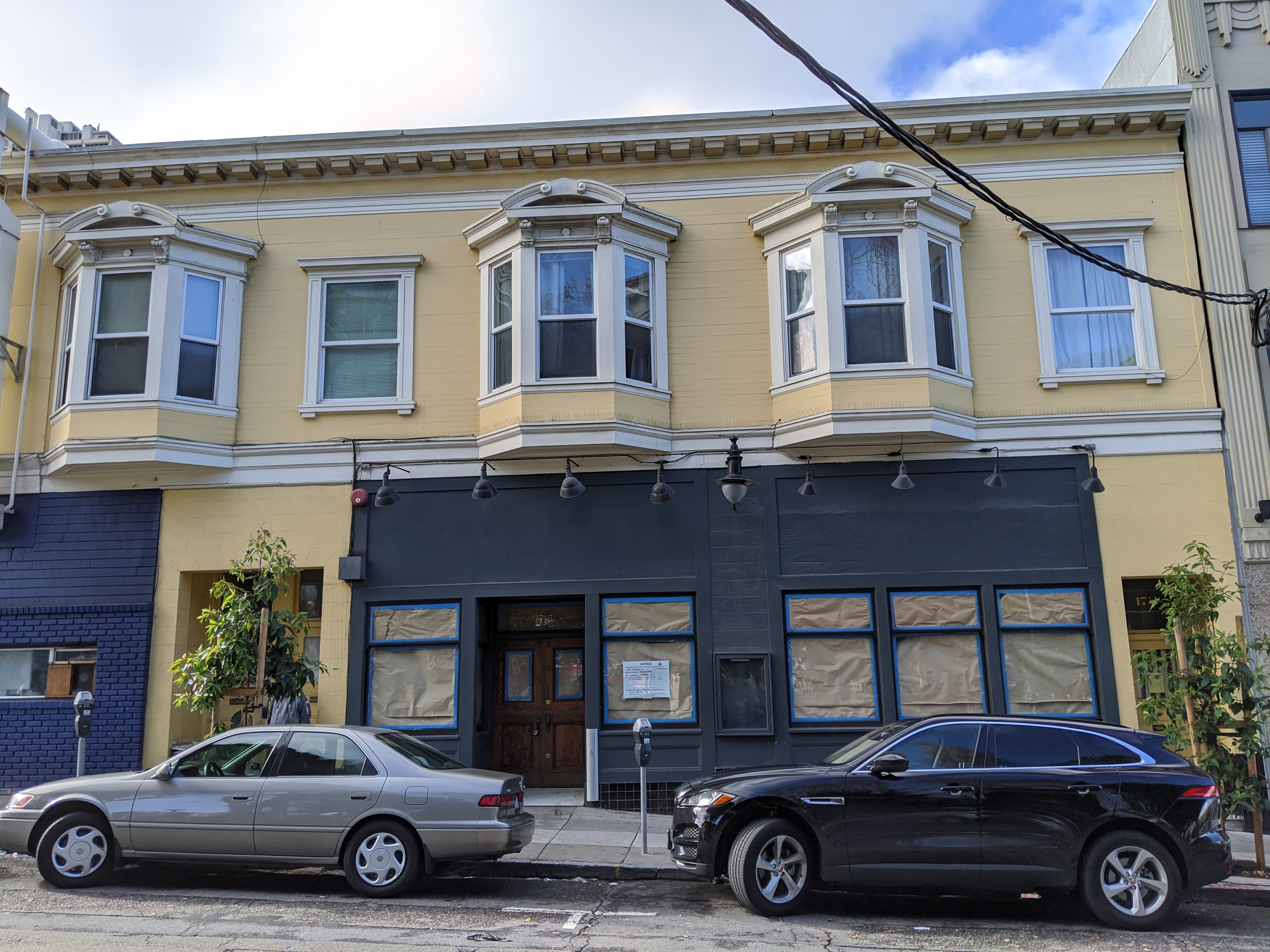
- Interactive map of Washington Square Bar and Grill

Restaurant information
- Established: 1973
- Closed: August 2010
- Previous owners: Ed Moose, Sam Deitsch
- Location: 1707 Powell Street, San Francisco, California, United States

The Washington Square Bar & Grill was a landmark restaurant adjoining Washington Square in San Francisco's North Beach neighborhood (Powell at Union streets). Known widely as the Washbag, so named by columnist Herb Caen as a play on words, it was a favorite gathering place for writers, politicians, musicians, and social elite.

== History ==
In 1973, Rose "Pistola" Evangelisti sold her bar Rose Pistola, and that fall the Washington Square Bar & Grill was opened there by Ed Moose, a former dispatcher and reporter for the St. Louis Post-Dispatch, his wife Mary Etta, and partner Sam Deitsch. It became a favorite gathering place for writers, politicians, musicians, and social elite. San Francisco Chronicle columnist Herb Caen coined its nickname, the "Washbag". Caen's decades-long buddy at the Chronicle, Pulitzer prizewinner Stanton Delaplane, wrote many of his columns while sitting by the Washbag's piano, then dispatched them to the paper via messenger.

Ed Moose organized a softball team, the Lapins Sauvages, composed of famous and influential people who were regular patrons, and Caen often wrote of the team's exploits in his columns, describing its travels to play in major stadiums in various locations around the world. In 1989 Ron Fimrite, a sporst writer and one of the team members, wrote The Square: the Story of a Saloon, describing the restaurant's place in San Francisco's cocktail culture.

In 1990 the partners sold the restaurant. With Sam Dietsch as a silent partner, the Mooses opened a larger restaurant, Moose's, on the opposite side of the square. The new restaurant soon took on the same local cultural significance for San Francisco.

The Washington Square Bar & Grill was sold to new partners in 2000, replaced by a club called Cobalt's and then revived, closed on January 1, 2008, and then reopened under new ownership on March 2, 2009. It closed permanently in August 2010. That same week, on August 12, 2010, Ed Moose died at San Francisco General Hospital. Mary Etta Moose died on December 23, 2023, two days after her 95th birthday. Memorabilia including the restaurant's sign and Delaplane's typewriter were given to the San Francisco History Center at the San Francisco Main Library.
