= Cass Calder Smith =

American architect

Cass Calder Smith, FAIA, (born 1961) is an American architect. He and his firm, Cass Calder Smith Architecture + Interiors, are known for high-profile restaurant designs in San Francisco, California, and New York City.

== Early life ==
Smith was born in New York City in 1961. His father is Howard Smith, a journalist and academy-award winning documentary film director. His mother is a California landscape painter and designer.

He grew up in the West Village neighborhood of New York City in the 1960s, attending Public School 41. His parents divorced when he was ten, and in 1972 he moved with his mother and younger brother Zachary, first to a commune in Rockland County, New York, then later to the Star Hill Academy for Anything, a commune near Woodside, California, that was adjacent to the home of musician Neil Young. The site had no running water or electricity, but it included the landowner's former lumber yard. Smith was out of school for several years, and spent the time building housing structures out of abandoned lumber. He attended high school in the Sierra Foothills and earned an undergraduate architecture degree from University of California, Berkeley. He supported himself as a carpenter during college, progressing from small jobs to complete design projects. He formed his own design and construction company after college, which he wound down to attend graduate school.

== Career ==
Smith established his architecture firm, CCS Architecture, in 1990. Smith's career designing restaurants started with Restaurant Lulu, one of the landmark restaurants in the early 1990s San Francisco dining scene. During his last semester at graduate school then-roommate Reed Hearon, an aspiring chef, was working with restaurateur Rowena Wu to open a restaurant in a former warehouse in San Francisco's SOMA district. Smith was awarded the commission, and the final design attracted much attention.

Aesthetically, he is known for clean, modernist design aesthetic.

In 2008 Smith was appointed to the San Francisco Arts Commission. In 2005 his firm opened a New York office. As of 2009 the firm employs approximately 20 people.

== Projects ==
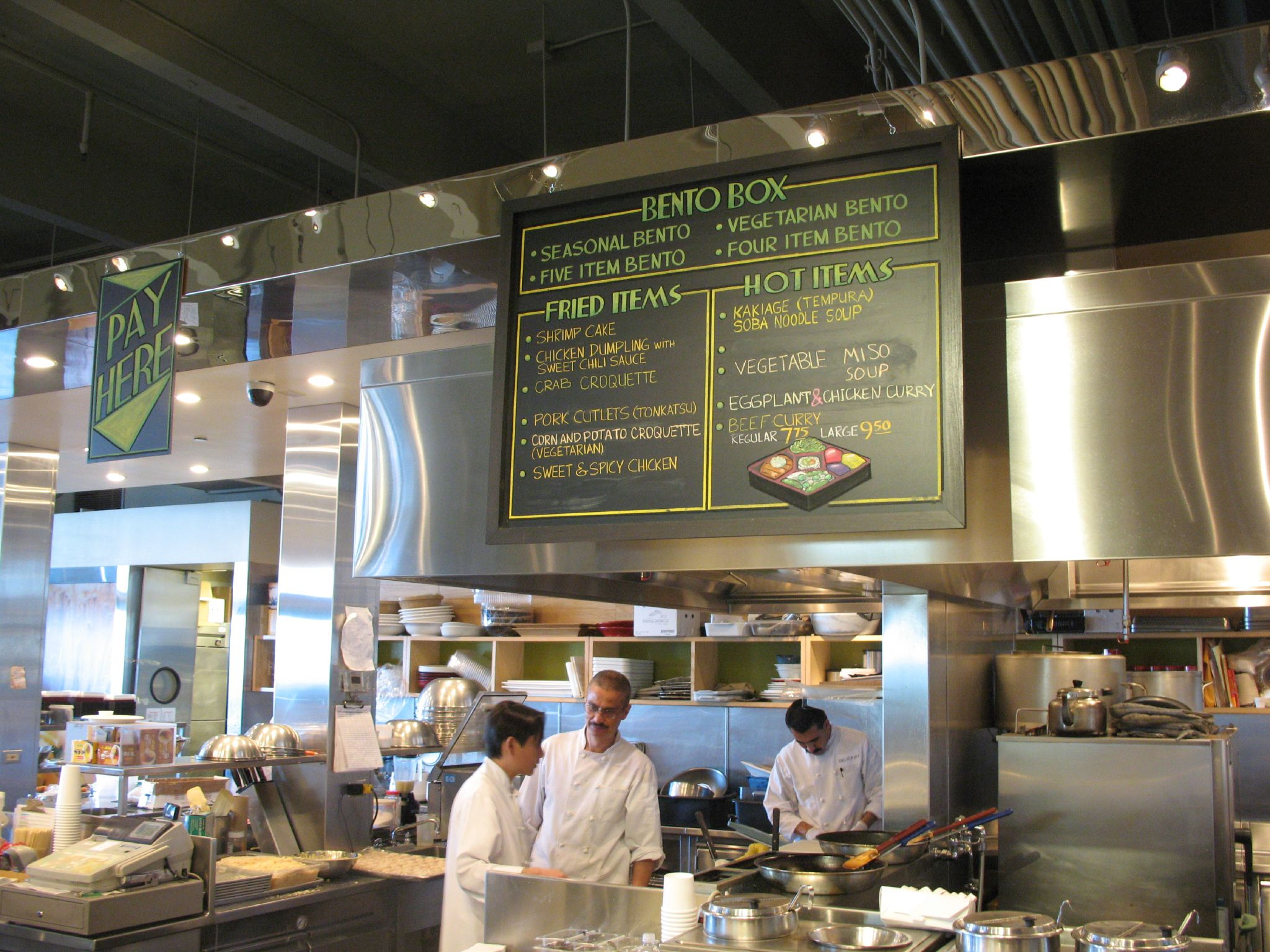
Delica rf-1 in San Francisco, California

Projects for which Smith is known include:

=== San Francisco ===
- Lulu, Ferry Building, San Francisco; his first restaurant project in 2004, closed in 2010
- Azie, San Francisco; near Lulu, closed and renovated in 2010
- La Mar Cebicheraria Peruana, on the Embarcadero, San Francisco
- Terzo, in Cow Hollow, San Francisco
- Perbacco, in the Financial District, San Francisco
- Rose Pistola, in North Beach, San Francisco
- Delica RF-1, in the Ferry Building, San Francisco
- Lettüs, in Cow Hollow, San Francisco
- Tavern on the Green, in Yerba Buena Gardens, San Francisco; project abandoned
- 25 Lusk, in SoMa, San Francisco; a large restaurant built in a converted meat packing plant

=== Other locations ===
- Reposado, Palo Alto
- Zibibbo, Palo Alto
- Wild Goose, Lake Tahoe
- Straits, in Santana Row, San Jose, California
- Hyatt Regency bar in Atlanta, Georgia
- Townline BBQ, in The Hamptons
- Lake Chalet, in Oakland, California
- Whitebark Restaurant, Westin Monache Resort, Mammoth Lakes, California
