= Pete McDonough =

American crime boss and bail bondsman

Peter P. McDonough (1872 – 8 July 1947) was a crime boss, bail bondsman, and saloon owner in San Francisco, in partnership with his brother Tom. The McDonough brothers were a wealthy and influential force in San Francisco, dominating much of the underworld from 1910 to 1941. Together, they were called the "King of the Tenderloin," and the "McDonough Brothers".

== Early life and family ==
Pete was born on May 10, 1872, and raised in the Cow Hollow neighborhood (now known as the Marina District) of San Francisco. He was the son of Hannora (née O'Connor) and Patrick McDonough, a San Francisco police sergeant and saloon owner. The McDonough family was of Irish-descent and they had five children. Pete attended Sacred Heart College in San Francisco and then for 12 years Pete worked at a haberdashery at 3rd Street and Market Street.

His older brother Thomas was born February 19, 1870, in San Francisco and was educated in the public schools and Sacred Heart College in San Francisco. Thomas was a member of the Fraternal Order of Eagles and the Druids.

== Career ==
In 1890, with his brother Thomas, Pete grew up to take over the saloon previously owned by his father, located at Kearny and Clay Streets. The bar was located close to the Hall of Justice, on Montgomery Street. This led the brothers to open the first bail bondsmen business at "the corner," as it was called at the time, in 1896. It is possible that the brothers founded the first modern bail bonds business in the United States, the system by which a person pays a percentage to a professional bondsman who puts up the cash as a guarantee that the person will appear in court.

Over time, the business expanded to include a range of services for accused individuals, such as providing lawyers. McDonough also developed a communication system with the police stations, so that his business could quickly respond to new arrests. As explained by FoundSF, "Within minutes of an arrest, McDonough's nephew was hailing a taxi to find a judge to sign an OR (order of release) form, and the client was soon free. Naturally, everyone was on the take, and McDonough was raking it in."

The brothers were a dominant force in organized labor. They provided bail without charge to striking workers, and he generously donated to the political campaigns of labor leaders. For example, he paid for the bail of striking streetcar workers during the 1906-07 strikes. For this support, the brothers often expected support from organized labor when they were in trouble.

McDonough was a product of the post-earthquake Abe Ruef days of civic corruption. During his years as the pre-eminent bondsmen in San Francisco, McDonough was accused of bribery, perjury, suborning witnesses, tampering with judges, bootlegging, corrupting officials, and controlling and paying off police. A 1919 Grand Jury exonerated San Francisco District Attorney Charles Fickert from charges made by John B. Densmore, investigator from Washington, Director General of Employment, in the framing of Thomas Mooney and Warren Billings and for Fickert having conspired with McDonough in the freeing of wealthy defendants. Labelled the "fountainhead of corruption" by Edwin Atherton in the 1937 Atherton Report on San Francisco police corruption, McDonough was considered the overlord of San Francisco vice, gambling, and prostitution. Furthermore, a grand jury concluded that "No one can conduct a prostitution or gambling enterprise in San Francisco without the approval direct or indirect of the McDonough brothers."

During prohibition, McDonough spent eight months in the Alameda County Jail for bootlegging and eventually sought a pardon from President Calvin Coolidge. He was jailed again in 1938 for refusing to discuss police corruption before the Police Graft grand jury headed by Marshall Dill.

Pete McDonough died on 8 July 1947, after having a stroke. Thomas died in 1948.

== Sources ==
- Atherton, Edwin (1937). The 1937 San Francisco Police Graft Report. ISBN 9781466109292.
