= Ole Christian Bendixen =

Norwegian sailor

Personal information
- Nationality: Norwegian
- Born: 5 August 1947 (age 77); Trondheim

Sport
- Country: Norway
- Sport: Sailing

Ole Christian Bendixen (born 5 August 1947) is a Norwegian sailor. He was born in Trondheim. He competed at the 1972 Summer Olympics in Munich.
