= Otey Cannon =

American soccer player (born 1950)

Personal information
- Date of birth: October 16, 1948 (age 78)
- Place of birth: San Francisco, California, United States
- Position: Forward

College career
| Years | Team | Apps | (Gls) |
| 1970–1971 | Chico State Wildcats | | |

Senior career*
| Years | Team | Apps | (Gls) |
| 1972–1974 | Dallas Tornado | 11 | (0) |
| 1974–1975 | Seattle Sounders | 10 | (1) |
| 1976–1978 | Sacramento Spirits | 57 | (16) |
- * Club domestic league appearances and goals

Otey Cannon is an American former soccer forward who was the first black American player in the North American Soccer League. He also played in the American Soccer League.

Cannon attended Chico State University where he played on the men's soccer team in 1970 and 1971. Although he played only two season, his 42 goals puts him second on the team's career goals list. Chico State inducted him into the Athletic Hall of Fame in 1995.

In 1972, Cannon turned professional with the Dallas Tornado of the North American Soccer League. In 1974, Dallas traded him to the expansion Seattle Sounders. In 1976, Cannon moved to the Sacramento Spirits of the American Soccer League.
