= Edwin Atherton =

American FBI agent (1896-1944)

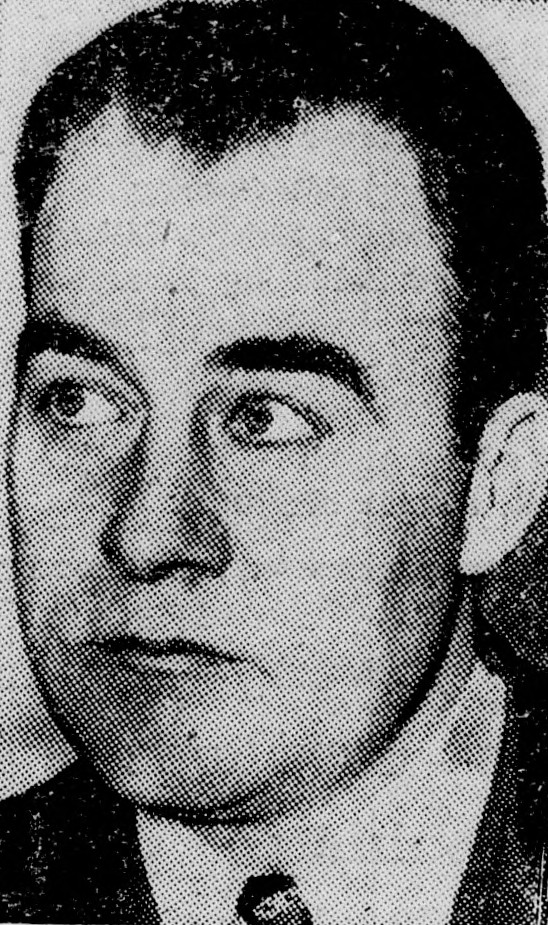
- Born: October 12, 1896; Washington, D.C., U.S.
- Died: August 31, 1944 (aged 47); Santa Monica, California, U.S.
- Resting place: Forest Lawn Memorial Park; Glendale, California
- Education: Georgetown University (1914)
- Occupations: Consul, FBI Agent; Private investigator Commissioner, Pacific Coast Conference (1940–1944)

Edwin Newton Atherton (October 12, 1896 – August 31, 1944) served as a foreign service officer, Bureau of Investigation agent, private investigator, and later, appointed head of the college athletics organization, the Pacific Coast Conference in 1940.

== Biography ==
Born in Washington, D.C., the son of Edwin J Atherton and Mary Agnes McCarten. Atherton studied law at Georgetown University (1914) for only four months. After leaving Georgetown, he was a clerk in a bank and then entered the consular service (January 1916) where during World War I he served in Genoa, Italy, followed by Bulgaria, and Jerusalem. After the war, Atherton served in Canada, then resigned from consular duties, March 13, 1925, and served the Department of Justice from 1925 to 1927. He served in New York, Boston, Detroit, Los Angeles and headed the Department of Justice office in San Francisco, California.

His service in the BOI (later FBI) was notable for his having worked on the 1924 capture of a neo-revolutionary army of Mexican nationals under the leadership of General Enrique Estrada at Engineer Springs on the California border. He resigned from the BOI in 1927 and started a private investigating firm in Los Angeles with another former special agent, Joseph Dunn, called Atherton and Dunn.

Atherton's firm was hired to investigate police graft and corruption (including Tenderloin, San Francisco brothel madam (prostitution), Dolly Fine). In 1937, they wrote a seventy-two-page report referred to as the "Atherton Report" on police corruption in the San Francisco Police Department.

"Atherton report on graft in the San Francisco Police Department as presented in the San Francisco Examiner, March 17, 1937"

He was paid $40,000 to thoroughly investigate the Pacific Coast Conference in 1938. After two years and the submission of his extensive two-million-word report, he was immediately appointed to be High Commissioner of the Pacific Coast Conference in January 1940 to carry out his recommended reforms.

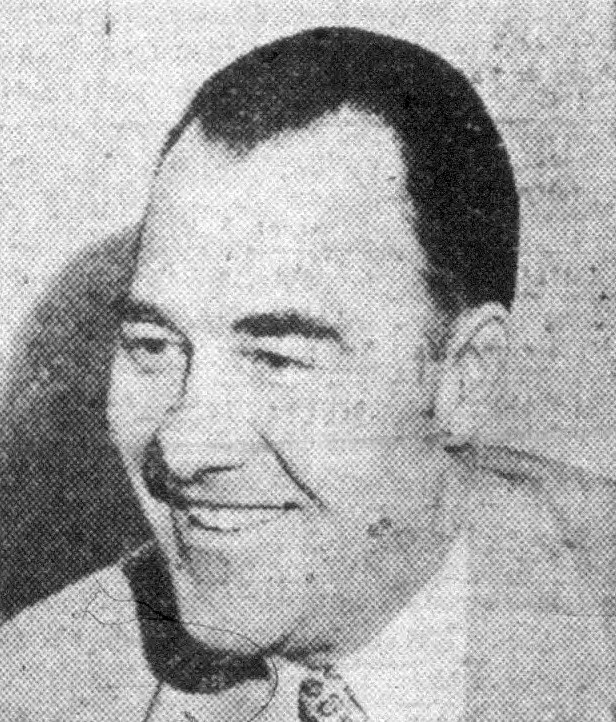

== Personal ==
He was previously married in 1924 to Elma Catheryne Atherton (née Jackson), who divorced him on grounds of cruelty in October 1941. His son Edwin Jr. was 12 years old at the time.

After a month-long hospitalization for a gall bladder illness in August 1944, Atherton died at age 47 at Santa Monica Hospital in Santa Monica, California.

Atherton was survived by his widow, Anzonetta Atherton, whom he had married in October 1942 in Las Vegas. Anzonetta Collison (née Moore), a playwright from Mason City, Iowa was the widow of Wilson Collison.
