= James Reed Averill =

American academic and psychologist

- Born: November 29, 1935; San Francisco, California, U.S.
- Died: August 19, 2024 (aged 88); Northampton, Massachusetts, U.S.
- Education: San Jose State University (B.A.), UCLA (Ph.D.)
- Occupations: Psychology, emotion research
- Known for: Social constructivist theory of emotion
- Awards: APA Division 24 President (1997–1998)

James Reed Averill (November 29, 1935 – August 19, 2024) was an American psychologist and professor known for his pioneering work in emotion research and development of the social constructivist approach to emotions. He served on the faculty of the University of Massachusetts Amherst for over 30 years and was president of the American Psychological Association's Division 24 (Theoretical and Philosophical Psychology) from 1997 to 1998.

== Early life and education ==
Averill was born in San Francisco, California, on November 29, 1935, to Dupree Reed Averill and Rosalie Diamond Averill. He spent his youth near the Sierra Nevada foothills, where his parents operated a resort at Pinecrest Lake. After he and his sister contracted polio, the family moved to Glendale and later Oceanside, California for the warmer climate.

He graduated from the Army and Navy Academy in Carlsbad, California and served in the United States Army from 1954 to 1957, stationed in Frankfurt, Germany. He earned a Bachelor of Arts in psychology and philosophy from San Jose State University in 1959, then received a Fulbright Scholarship to study at the Medical Academy in Düsseldorf and the University of Bonn in Germany.

Averill completed his Ph.D. in physiological psychology at the University of California, Los Angeles (UCLA) in 1966.

== Career ==
=== Early career ===
After his doctorate, Averill worked as a research psychologist at University of California, Berkeley from 1966 to 1971 under Richard Lazarus, focusing on stress and coping mechanisms.

=== University of Massachusetts Amherst ===
In 1971, Averill joined the University of Massachusetts Amherst as an associate professor of psychology, became full professor in 1976, and remained until his retirement in 2006. He was a founding member of the Department of Psychological and Brain Sciences.

== Research and contributions ==
=== Social constructivist theory of emotion ===
Averill is recognized as a founder of the social constructivist approach to emotion research. His 1980 chapter "A Constructivist View of Emotion" proposed that emotions function as transitional social roles rather than solely physiological responses.

=== Research areas ===
Averill's work covered anger and aggression, grief and bereavement, hope and optimism, emotional creativity, solitude and its benefits, and aesthetic experiences. His 1982 book Anger and Aggression: An Essay on Emotion is seminal in emotion research, with over 3,900 citations.

== Professional recognition ==
Averill served as president of American Psychological Association Division 24 in 1997–1998 and was a fellow of APA Divisions 1, 8, and 24, and a founding fellow of the Association for Psychological Science.

He published over 130 scholarly works, advancing emotion research in social psychology and personality psychology.

== Personal life ==
Averill married Judith Wittenberger on June 9, 1962; they had two daughters. Judith died in June 2023. In retirement, he participated in the Five College Learning in Retirement program and traveled extensively.

== Death ==
Averill died on August 19, 2024, in Northampton, Massachusetts, at 88.

== Selected publications ==
=== Books ===
- Anger and Aggression: An Essay on Emotion (1982, reprinted 2012). Springer. ISBN 978-1-4613-8167-9
- Rules of Hope (1990). Springer. ISBN 978-1-4613-8171-6
- Voyages of the Heart: Living an Emotionally Creative Life (1992). Free Press. ISBN 978-0-02-901485-1

=== Articles ===
- Averill, J. R. (1973). "Personal control over aversive stimuli and its relationship to stress." Psychological Bulletin, 80(4), 286–303.
- Averill, J. R. (1983). "Studies on anger and aggression: Implications for theories of emotion." American Psychologist, 38(11), 1145–1160.
- Averill, J. R. (1999). "Individual differences in emotional creativity: Structure and correlates." Journal of Personality, 67(2), 331–371.

== See also ==
- Social constructivism
- Richard Lazarus
- Appraisal theory
