= Maria Seise =

Maria Seise was the first Chinese woman to immigrate to California, arriving in Hawaii (then the Sandwich Islands) in 1837 and San Francisco in 1848.

As a young girl, she ran away from her home in Canton to Macao to avoid being sold into slavery by her parents, a common practice amongst impoverished families in China to escape destitution. In Macao she worked for a Portuguese family, eventually adopting the Roman Catholic faith and marrying Portuguese sailor. After her husband disappeared on a voyage, she worked for an American family and moved to Hawaii in 1837. She returned to China six years later where she found employment under the Charles V. Gillespie household. In 1848 aboard the Eagle, Seise arrived in San Francisco with the Gillespies. She was reported to be a close companion to Mrs. Gillespie and learned English fluently enough to be confirmed into her church. Maria Seise stayed with the Gillespies and settled on a large tract of land near Chinatown.
