= Jesse McCargar =

American businessman (1879–1954)

Jesse B. McCargar (1879-1954) was an American banker and industrialist.

== Early life ==
Jesse B. McCargar was born in Nord, Butte County, California on Aug. 11, 1879. He was the son of Philander McCargar and Emily Lawson. Philander McCargar was a dentist in Oakland, CA. He was born in Canada, and migrated with his father, Samuel McCargar, a prosperous rancher, from Rice County, MN to Butte County, CA. in 1861. Philander McCargar met and married his wife, Emily Lawson, on a business trip for his father in Topeka, KS in 1874. Dr. Philander McCargar graduated from the U. C. Berkeley School of Dentistry in 1888. Living in Oakland, CA., Philander McCargar was very active in the Prohibition Party. He ran for mayor of Oakland twice and supported various committees and organizations for the Prohibitionist cause. Jesse and his brother joined the Spanish–American War in 1898. After the war and his father's death, Jesse went into banking.

In 1905 Jesse married Addie Goodrich (1882-1920). They had 4 children. The youngest was the author, diplomat, and intelligence agent James Goodrich McCargar (1920-2007). After the death of his first wife, Jesse married Phoebe Hunt in 1923. After his divorce from Phoebe Hunt, he married Helen Baker in 1949.

== Career ==
Jesse McCargar started his banking career early in his life. He worked for Crocker National Bank for 22 years. At the time of his retirement in 1927, he was Vice President and Director. He was a past president of the California Bankers Assoc., and was a member of the executive council of the American Bankers Assoc. He was, at various times in his life, director or on the board of many companies including: American Trust Co., Pabco Products, Inc., Moore Dry Dock Company, Pacific Securities Co., Pioneer Kettlemen Co., Honolulu Oil Corp. Pacific Transport Lines, Hutchinson Sugar Plantation Co., Paauhau Sugar Plantation Co., and others. He was president of the Dumbarton Bridge Co., which opened the Dumbarton Bridge on the San Francisco bay in 1927. He was also a trustee of the William G. Irwin Charity Foundation and a manager of the Irwin Estate.

Jesse was an active member of the Pacific Union Club, Bohemian Club, the San Francisco Golf Club, and the Live Oak Lodge of Masons.
