= Stanton Delaplane =

San Francisco Chronicle columnist

Stanton Hill ("Stan") Delaplane (12 October 1907 – 18 April 1988) was an American travel writer, credited with introducing Irish coffee to the United States. Called "last of the old irreplaceables" by fellow-columnist Herb Caen, he worked for the San Francisco Chronicle for 53 years, winning a Pulitzer Prize for reporting in 1942.

== Early life ==
Delaplane was born in Chicago, Illinois, and attended high school there and in Santa Barbara and Monterey, California.

== Career ==
Delaplane's career as a journalist began as a writer for Apéritif Magazine from 1933 to 1936, when he joined the San Francisco Chronicle as a reporter He won the Pulitzer Prize for Reporting in 1942 for a depiction of the State of Jefferson, a state that residents of far northern California and southern Oregon proposed semi-seriously in order to publicize their grievances. He also won National Headliner Awards in 1946 and 1959. In 1944 and 1945 he served as a war correspondent in the Pacific Ocean theater of World War II.

=== Irish coffee ===
After drinking Irish coffee at Shannon Airport in Ireland, Delaplane convinced Jack Koeppler, then owner of the Buena Vista Cafe in San Francisco, to start serving it at his bar. On November 10, 1952, the two spent hours perfecting the Irish method for floating the cream on top of the coffee, reportedly to the point where Delaplane almost passed out on the cable car tracks outside.

=== Postcards ===
Beginning in 1953 Delaplane published a syndicated humorous travel column called "Postcards". In later years Delaplane would write his travel dispatches (which he called "postcards") from his home on Telegraph Hill, finishing them over a martini and cigarettes by the piano at the Washington Square Bar and Grill before sending them to the newspaper building by messenger. His writing style was characterized by very short sentences and sentence fragments, which he said was for the benefit of San Francisco Municipal Railway riders who had to read the paper while being jostled by the commuter train. He was known for exaggerating and sometimes fictionalizing his stories, and wrote often of the North Beach neighborhood and various eccentric people who lived in San Francisco. About his writing style, British commentator Alistair Cooke wrote, "Stanton Delaplane wrote like a young and happy and wholly successful pupil of Hemingway. He rarely wrote sentences of more than six or seven words and he could go weeks without calling on an adjective. His peculiar magic, which I often probed into and never discovered, was to keep these bare sentences rollicking along in the most effortless way, running as clean as spring water over the bed of a brook. He could not help being an entertaining writer and that is a gift that very few writers indeed can legitimately claim from the double-domed philosophers to the light-weight journalists."

=== Ding dong daddy ===
Delaplane's second Headliner award was for a semi-fictionalized account of Francis Van Wie, a Muni conductor arrested for bigamy for keeping 18 wives. Delaplane promoted the story into a nationwide sensation, calling Van Wie "The Ding-Dong Daddy of the D Car Line" after a popular Louis Armstrong song, "Ding Dong Daddy of Dumas" (in reality, Van Wie never worked on the D line). The story inspired the American swing revival band the Cherry Popping Daddies to write a new song about Van Wie, "Ding-Dong Daddy of the D Car Line", which Warren Sapp and Kym Johnson performed as part of their second-place finish in Season 7 of Dancing With The Stars.

Delaplane's final column ran the day he died, and was a reminiscence of old days in North Beach.

== Published works ==
- Stanton Delaplane (1953). Postcards from Delaplane. Doubleday.
- Stanton Delaplane (1959). The Little World of Stanton Delaplane, Being Stanton Delaplane's Observations of the Lighter Side of Life on Our Small Planet. Coward-McCann. "Stanton Delaplane."
- Stanton Delaplane, Robert William De Roos (1960). Delaplane in Mexico:a Short, Happy Guide. Coward-McCann.
- Stanton Delaplane (1961). And how She Grew. Coward-McCann. "and how she grew."
- Stanton Delaplane (1963). Pacific Pathways. McGraw-Hill.
- Stanton Delaplane, Stuart Nixon (1976). Stan Delaplane's Mexico. Chronicle Books. ISBN 978-0-87701-084-5.

== See also ==
- Feuilleton
- Causerie
