= Ron Fimrite =

American sportswriter and author (1931–2010)

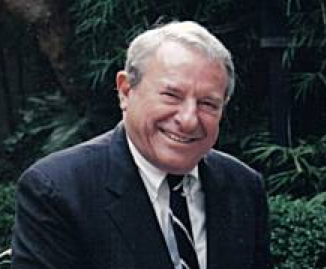
- Born: January 6, 1931; Healdsburg, California, U.S.
- Died: April 30, 2010 (aged 79)
- Education: University of California, Berkeley
- Occupations: Humorist, historian, sportswriter

Ron Fimrite (January 6, 1931 – April 30, 2010) was an American humorist, historian, sportswriter and author who was best known for his writing for Sports Illustrated.

Fimrite began his career at the Berkeley Gazette in 1955, moving to the San Francisco Chronicle. He was nicknamed "The Sporting Tiger" and was part of a famous circle of San Francisco Chronicle columnists that included Herb Caen, Art Hoppe, Stanton Delaplane and Charles McCabe. He became a sports columnist for Sports Illustrated in 1971. He authored numerous books about sports.

== Books ==
- Golden Bears: A Celebration of Cal Football's Triumphs, Heartbreaks, Last-Second Miracles, Legendary Blunders and the Extraordinary People Who Made It All Possible, 2009
- Winged O: The Olympic Club of San Francisco 1860-2009
- Sports Illustrated: Moments of Glory: Unforgettable Games, 2000
- The World Series: A History of Baseball's Fall Classic 1993, 1996, 1999
- A Series for the Fans: 1995 World Series
- Birth of a Fan: A Collection of Original Works, 1993
- Three Weeks in October, the 1989 World Series, and the Loma Prieta Earthquake
- The Square: The Story of a Saloon, 1989
