= Rose Pistola =

Defunct Italian restaurant in San Francisco, California, U.S.

- Interactive map of Rose Pistola

Restaurant information
- Established: 1996; 30 years ago
- Closed: 2017; 9 years ago
- Head chef: Reed Hearon
- Food type: Ligurian (Italian)
- Location: 532 Columbus Avenue, San Francisco, California, United States
- Coordinates: 37.8001°N 122.4095°W

Rose Pistola was an Italian restaurant in the North Beach neighborhood in San Francisco. Specializing in cuisine from the Ligurian region of Italy, it opened in 1996, by Reed Hearon, a Texas-born chef, and received the James Beard Foundation Award for Best New Restaurant the following year.

== History ==
The restaurant was named after Rose "Pistola" Evangelisti and her popular local bar, Rose Pistola, at 1707 Powell Street (later, the Washington Square Bar and Grill), across from Washington Square Park that she owned from the 1950s to 1973; chef Reed Hearon and co-owner Laurie Thomas purchased the rights from Evangelisti for an undisclosed sum and a promise that she could visit and eat as she liked.

"Hearon focused on the specialties of the Ligurian region. His kitchen was equipped with a wood-burning oven, rotisserie and two separate grills, turning out pizza, whole roast fish, cast iron pots of polenta and other dishes that made it the best Italian restaurant of its era."

Rose Pistola closed in February 2017, with its owners citing rising costs and diminished popularity.

In 2025, former Rose Pistola executive chef Valentino Luchin was arrested for allegedly robbing three San Francisco banks in one day. Luchin had further legal troubles associated with bank robbing in 2018.

== See also ==
- James Beard Foundation Award: 1990s
- List of Italian restaurants
