= Reed Hearon =

American chef (born 1957)

- Born: 1957 (age 68–69); Austin, Texas, U.S.
- Education: University of Chicago, University of Texas at Austin
- Culinary career
- Cooking style: French, regional Mexican, Ligurian cuisines
- Previous restaurants: * Rose Pistola, San Francisco, California (1996–2017), * LuLu, San Francisco, California (1993–1996) * Cafe Marimba, San Francisco, California (1993–2002)
- Awards won: * Best New Chef, Food & Wine (1994) *Chef of The Year, San Francisco Focus Magazine (1996)

Reed Hearon (born 1957) is an American chef, cookbook author, businessperson, and restauranteur. During the 1990s dot-com bubble, he opened many notable restaurants in San Francisco, California, including LuLu, Rose Pistola, Rose's Cafe, Cafe Marimba, and the Black Cat. Hearon is known for his work with French, regional Mexican, and Ligurian cuisines.

Since 1993, Hearon co-founded a restaurant investment firm called Nice Ventures; as well as in 2001, he founded Hearon Designs, a consultancy for the food industry; and in 2011, founded a wine-focused software company called Purevin.

== Biography ==
Reed Hearon was born in 1957, in Austin, Texas. He attended college at the University of Chicago, and the University of Texas at Austin, and studied mathematics and philosophy.

In his early career, Hearon worked at The Avenue restaurant in Austin, the Rattlesnake Club in Denver, and worked as a sous–chef at Mark Miller's Coyote Café in Santa Fe. In 1988, he moved to the West Coast, in order to take over the existing Corona Bar and Grill in San Francisco, California.

Hearon appeared on the series, Julia Child: Lessons with Master Chefs, season 1.

== Awards and honors ==
Julia Child named Hearon as one of the 30 most promising young chefs in the United States in 1987. In 1994, Hearon was awarded "Best New Chef" at Food & Wine magazine.

His former restaurant Rose Pistola was awarded the James Beard Foundation Award for "Best New Restaurant" in 1997. In 2016, the San Francisco Chronicle voted LuLu as one of the most important restaurants of the San Francisco Bay Area, for their usage of new trends including the beginning of using communal table, serving family-style dishes, for being located in SoMa neighborhood (which was once a desolate area), and their use of a wood oven in the center of the dining room.

== List of former restaurants ==
- LuLu Petite (2004–2010), Ferry Building, 1 Embarcadero, San Francisco, California, U.S.
- Black Cat (1998–), 501 Broadway Street, San Francisco, California, U.S.
- Zibibbo (1997–2014), 430 Kipling Street, Palo Alto, California, U.S.
- LuLu Petite (1996–2014), 430 Kipling Street, Palo Alto, California, U.S.
- Rose's Cafe (1997–), 2298 Union Street, San Francisco, California, U.S.
- Rose Pistola (1996–2017), 532 Columbus Avenue, San Francisco, California, U.S.
- LuLu (1993–1996), 816 Folsom Street, San Francisco, California, U.S.
- Cafe Marimba (2001–), 908 Fourth Street, San Rafael, California, U.S.
- Cafe Marimba (1993–2001, left in 1999), 2317 Chestnut Street, San Francisco, California, U.S.
- Corona Bar and Grill (1988–), 88 Cyril Magnin, San Francisco, California, U.S.
- Coyote Café (1987–1988), 132 W. Water Street, Santa Fe, New Mexico, U.S. (working under chef Mark Miller)

== Publications ==
- Hearon, Reed; Capucilli, Karen (April 1, 1993). Salsa. San Francisco, CA: Chronicle Books. ISBN 978-0811803281.
- Hearon, Reed; Smith, Larry L. (January 1, 1996). LA Parilla: The Mexican Grill. San Francisco, CA: Chronicle Books. ISBN 978-0811810340.
- Hearon, Reed (January 1, 1997). Bocaditos: The Little Dishes of Mexico. Laurie Smith (photographer). San Francisco, CA: Chronicle Books. ISBN 978-0811810098.
- Hearon, Reed; Knickerbocker, Peggy (October 19, 1999). The Rose Pistola Cookbook: 140 Italian Recipes from San Francisco's Favorite North Beach Restaurant. Broadway. ISBN 978-0767902502.

== See also ==
- Michael Mina, restaurateur and chef in San Francisco
- Judy Rodgers, chef and cookbook author in San Francisco
- Jeremiah Tower, celebrity chef in San Francisco
- Cass Calder Smith, former interior architect for LuLu's in San Francisco
