= Friedrich Bendixen =

German economist (1864-1920)

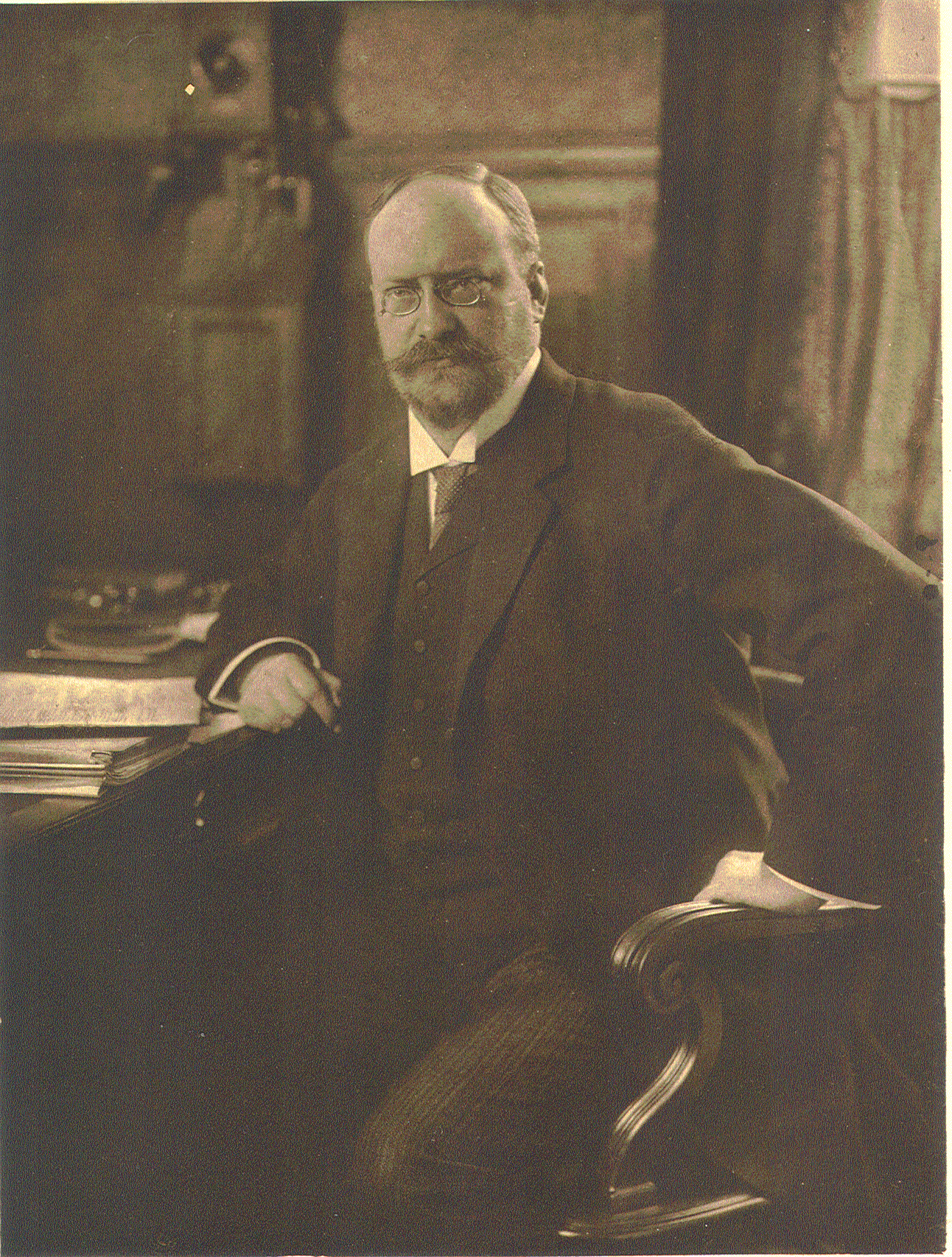
- 1905 portrait
- Born: September 12, 1864; Altona, German Confederation
- Died: December 25, 1920 (aged 56); Hamburg, Germany
- Occupations: Economist, banker
- Known for: Monetary theory and banking policy

Friedrich Bendixen (1864–1920) was an American-born German banker who made contributions to monetary theory. He was born in San Francisco, California in the United States, and received his education in Germany at Heidelberg and Leipzig. Bendixen was a banker in Hamburg, Germany.

== Monetary theory of Bendixen ==
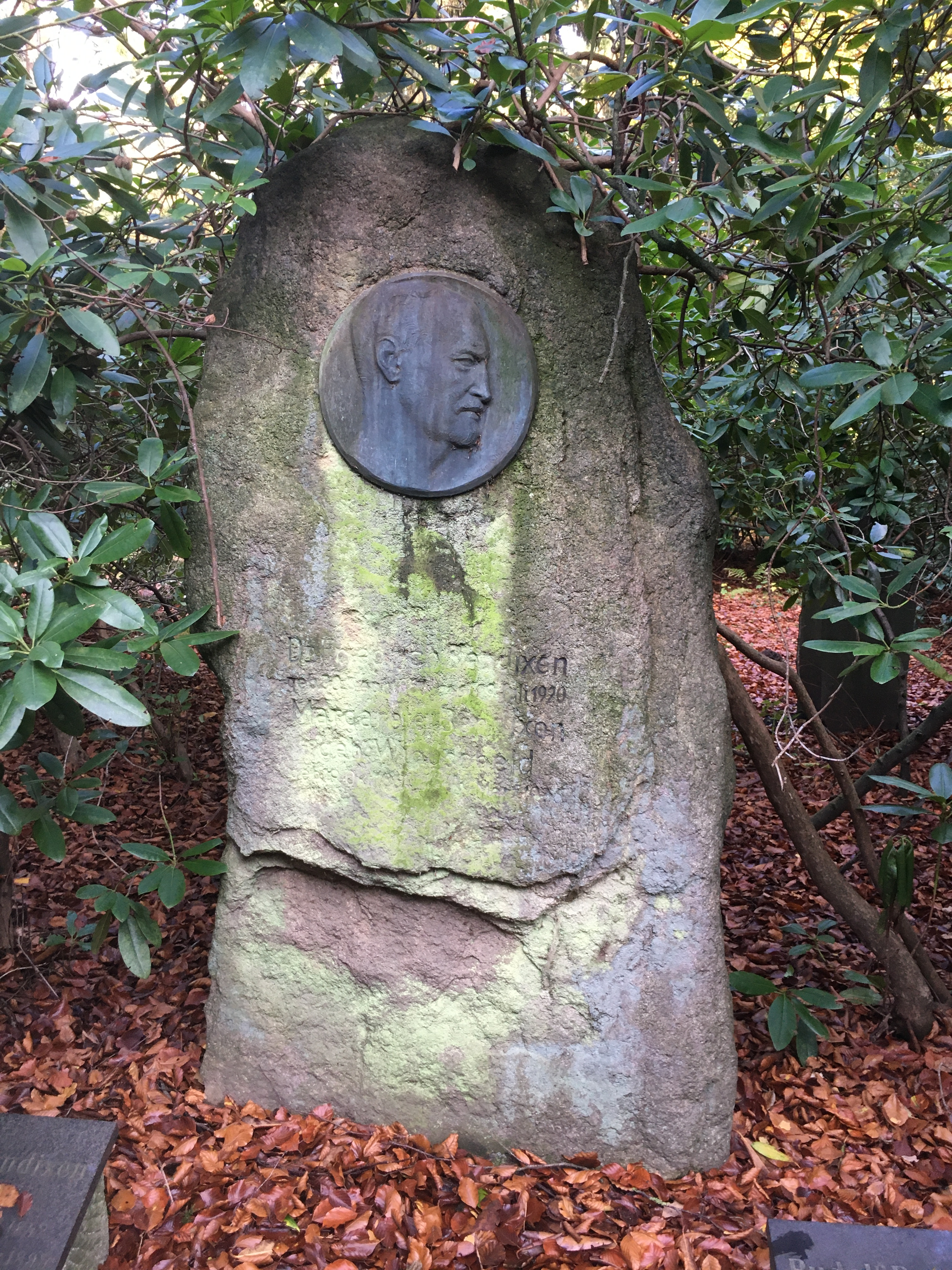
Grave of Friedrich Bendixen

The supply of money should not increase faster than production, because as production increases, the ratio of the circulation of money (notes that acquire goods) and goods themselves should remain constant, otherwise prices and values would become unstable. Friedrich Bendixen died at the age of 55 in Hamburg and was buried in the Ohlsdorf cemetery there. The preserved gravesite is located in plan square Z 12 southwest of the North Pond.

== Bibliography ==
- The Nature of Money (Das Wesen des Geldes). (1908) 4th ed., Duncker & Humblot, Munich 1926.
- Money and Capital. (Geld und Kapital, 1912), 3rd ed., G. Fischer, Jena 1922.
- German banking legislation and the Balkan crisis (Die deutsche Bankgesetzgebung und die Balkankrisis). Guttentag, Berlin 1913.
- Monetary Policy and Monetary Theory in the Light of the World War (Währungspolitik und Geldtheorie im Lichte des Weltkrieges). Duncker and Humblot, Munich 1916.
- Socialism and the National Economy under the Wartime Constitution (Sozialismus und Volkswirtschaft in der Kriegsverfassung). Berlin: Guttentag, 1916.
- The Inflation Problem (Das Inflationsproblem). Stuttgart: Enke, 1917.
- Usury and Chain Trading (Wucher und Kettenhandel). Hamburg: Boysen, 1918.
- War Loans and Financial Distress (Kriegsanleihen und Finanznot). Jena: G. Fischer, 1919.
- Editor of several published collections of letters.
