= List of Native Hawaiians =

List of notable Native Hawaiians

This is a list of notable Native Hawaiians. To be included on this list, they must be notable and be of the Indigenous Polynesian people of the Hawaiian Islands, or their descendants.

== Academia and science ==
- Isabella Abbott (1919–2010), educator, phycologist, and ethnobotanist; first native Hawaiian woman to receive a PhD in science
- Lilia Wahinemaikaʻi Hale (1913 – 2003), educator, musician, and prominent champion of ʻŌlelo Hawaiʻi
- John Dominis Holt IV (1919 – 1993), writer, poet and cultural historian
- Kamakahukilani (1937–1999), Native Hawaiian educator, poet, and activist
- Kauanoe Kamanā (born 1954), ʻŌlelo Hawaiʻi educator
- Cliff Kapono, scientist, surfer, journalist; his work is focused on researching ocean conservation and sustainability at University of Hawai'i at Hilo
- Samuel Kamakau, historian and scholar of Hawaiian culture and language, author
- John S. K. Kauwe III (born 1980), geneticist and 11th president of Brigham Young University–Hawaii (BYU–Hawaii)
- Noelani Goodyear-Kaʻōpua, professor, writer, and activist
- David Malo (1795–1853), Native Hawaiian historian of the Kingdom of Hawaii
- R. Keao NeSmith, Native Hawaiian linguist, educator, and translator
- Mary Kawena Pukui (1895–1986), Hawaiian scholar, author, composer, hula expert and educator
- Nainoa Thompson, Polynesian navigator, Trustee for Kamehameha Schools
- Haunani-Kay Trask (1949–2021), Hawaiian nationalist, educator, political scientist, author, and professor emeritus at the University of Hawaiʻi at Mānoa
Native Hawaiians in academia and science

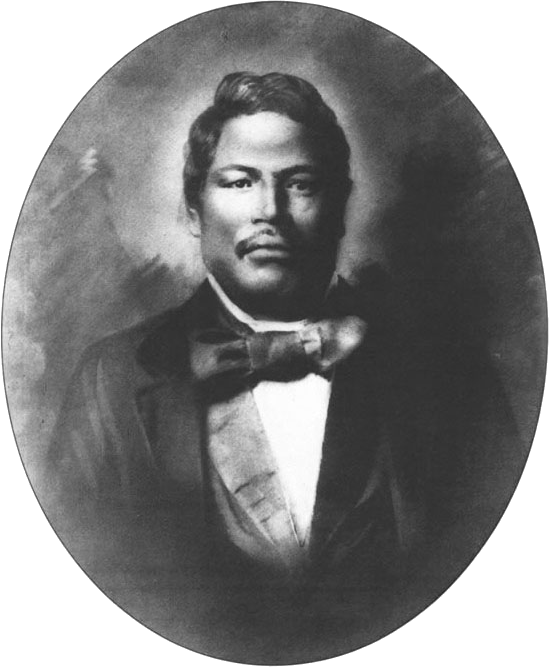

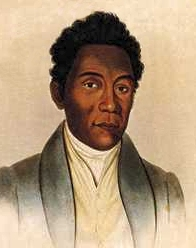

== Arts and entertainment ==
- Sam Choy, chef, restaurateur, and Food Network television personality
- Johanna Drew Cluney, Hawaiian featherwork artist, conservator, and collector of featherwork
- Marcus Coloma (born 1978), television and film actor
- Sasha Colby (born 1984), drag queen, beauty pageant winner, winner of RuPaul's Drag Race
- Auliʻi Cravalho (born 2000), actress and singer
- Frank De Lima (born 1949), comedian and Catholic deacon
- William De Los Santos (born 1965), author, poet, screenwriter, film director and film producer
- Solomon Enos, artist, illustrator, and activist
- Brian Haberlin (born 1963), comic book artist, writer, editor and producer
- Kelly Hu (born 1968), actress, former fashion model and beauty pageant queen
- Maren Jensen (born 1956), former model and actress; known for starring in the 1970s television series Battlestar Galactica
- Herb Kawainui Kāne (1928–2011), artist, historian, author, architect, and a principal figure in the Hawaiian Renaissance
- Kaliko Kauahi, television actress
- Gilbert Lani Kauhi (1937–2004), often credited as "Zulu", actor who starred in the television series Hawaii Five-O
- Mary Louise Kekuewa (1926–2008) master of lei hulu making, feather worker, and teacher
- Al Kikume (1894–1972), actor and stuntman
- Brook Mahealani Lee (born 1971), actress, television host, model, Miss Universe 1997
- Patrick Makuakāne (born 1962), kumu hula, cultural preservationist, and MacArthur Fellow 2023
- Jason Scott Lee (born November 19, 1966), actor and martial artist
- Steve Leialoha (born 1952), comic book artist
- Agnes Lum (born 1956), gravure idol, bikini model, actor, and singer
- Jarah Mariano (born 1984), model
- Maxine (born 1986), model and professional WWE wrestler
- Janet Mock (born 1983), television host, director, producer, writer, and transgender rights activist
- Jason Momoa (born 1979), actor
- Kellye Nakahara (1948–2020), actress, starred in the television show M*A*S*H
- Adrienne Keahi Pao (born 1975), photographer and artist
- Ed Parker (1931–1990), martial artist, actor, grandmaster, and founder of American Kenpo karati
- Keanu Reeves (born 1964), actor; Canadian born
- Rap Reiplinger, Emmy-award winning comedian
- Nicole Scherzinger (born 1978), singer-songwriter and television personality
- Wini Shaw (1907–1982), actress, singer
- Shannyn Sossamon (born 1978), actress
- David Strathairn (born 1949), actor
- Napua Stevens (1918–1990), entertainer, singer, hula dancer, musician, teacher, radio-television personality, event producer and author
- Kiana Tom (born 1965), television host, fitness expert, author, actress, and businesswoman
- Herman Wedemeyer (1924–1999), actor, football player, and politician; starred in Hawaii Five-O (1972–1980)
Native Hawaiians in the arts and entertainment

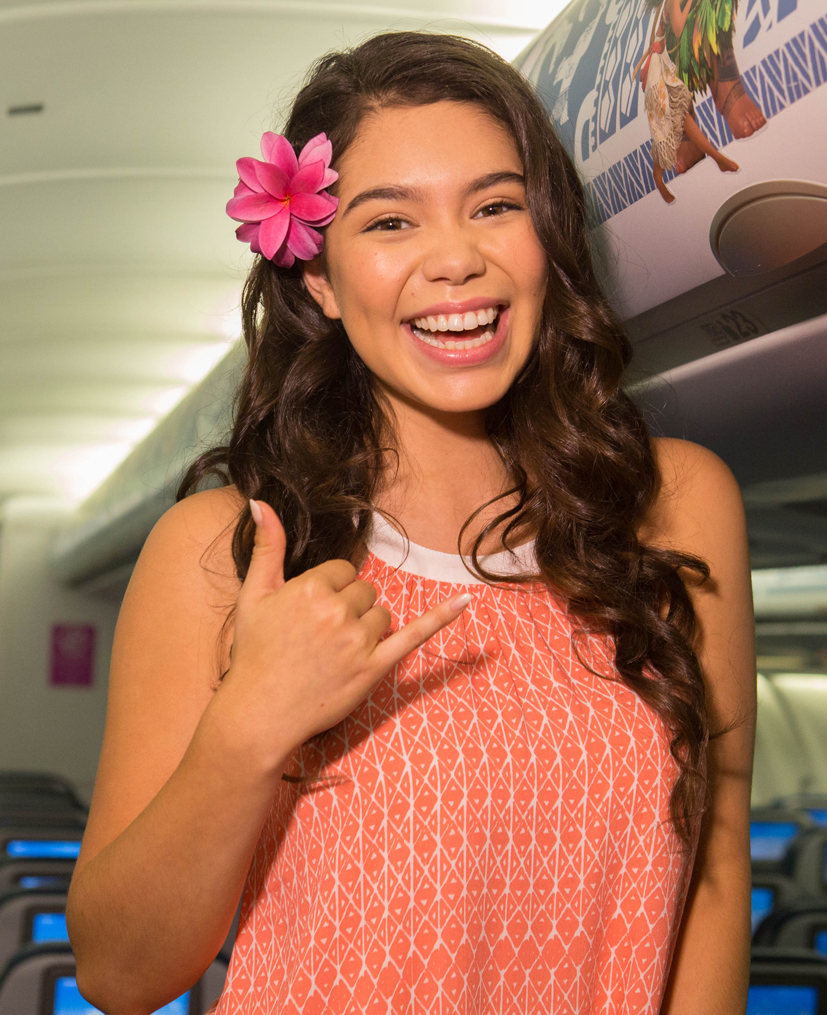

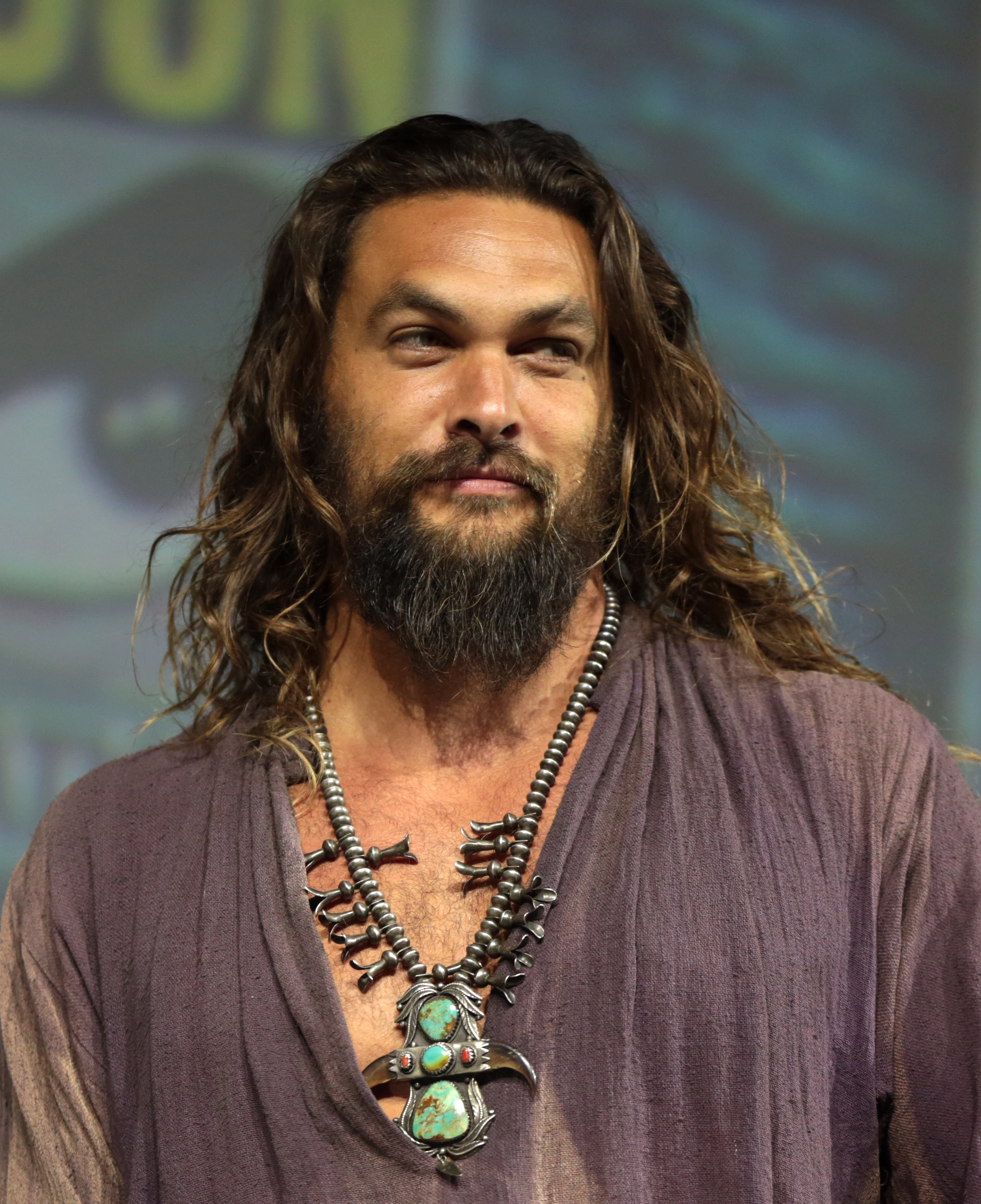

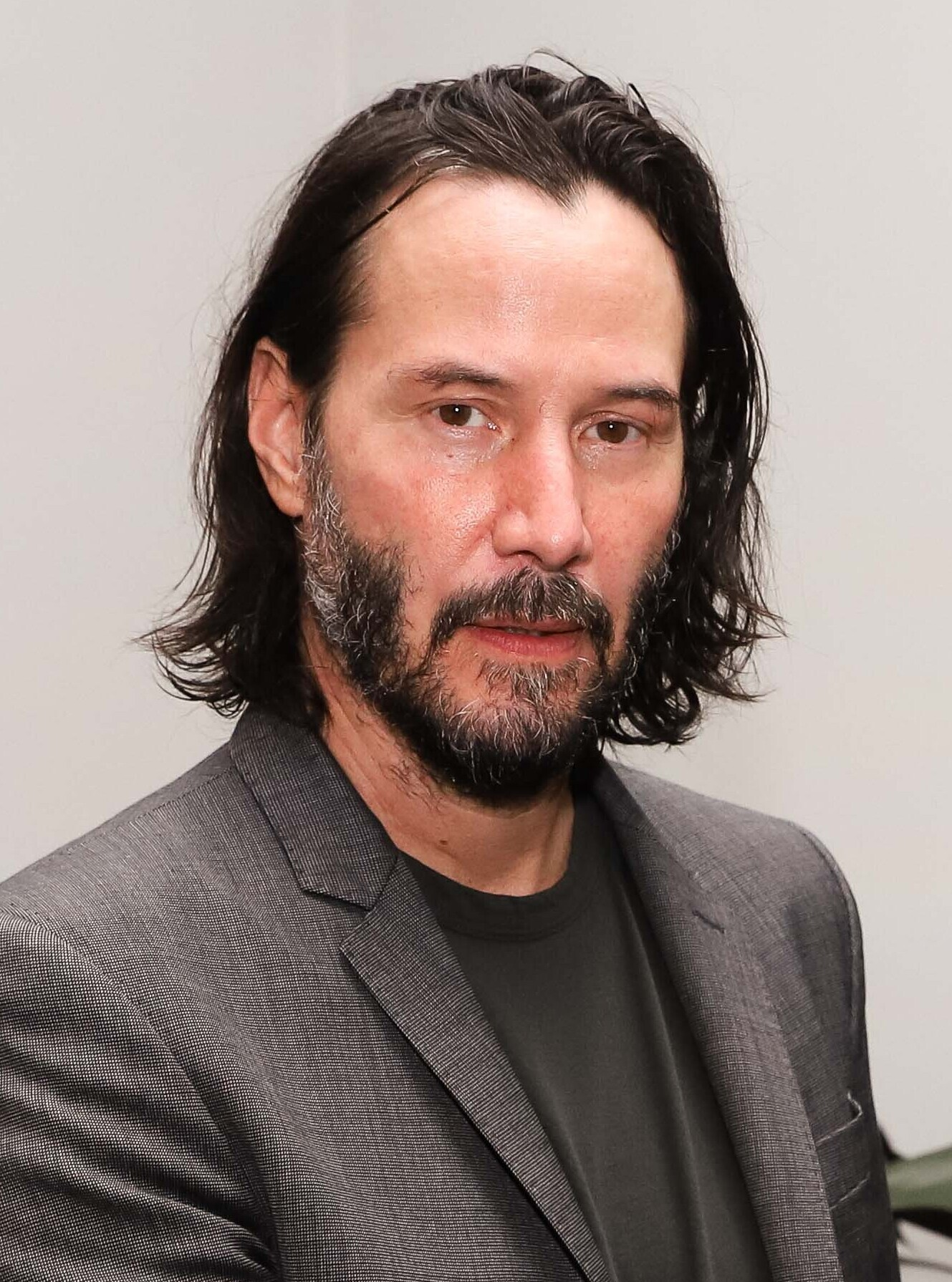

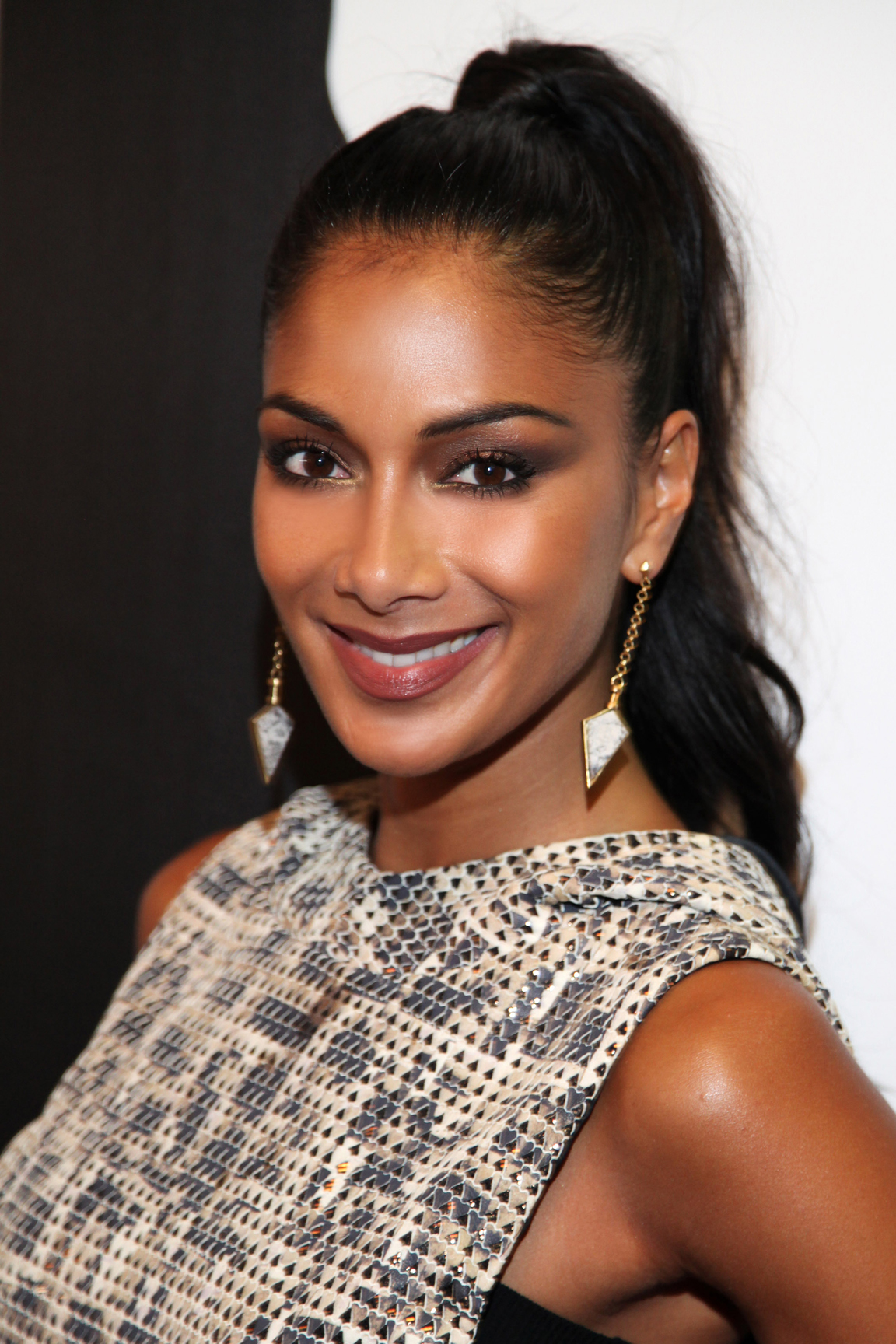

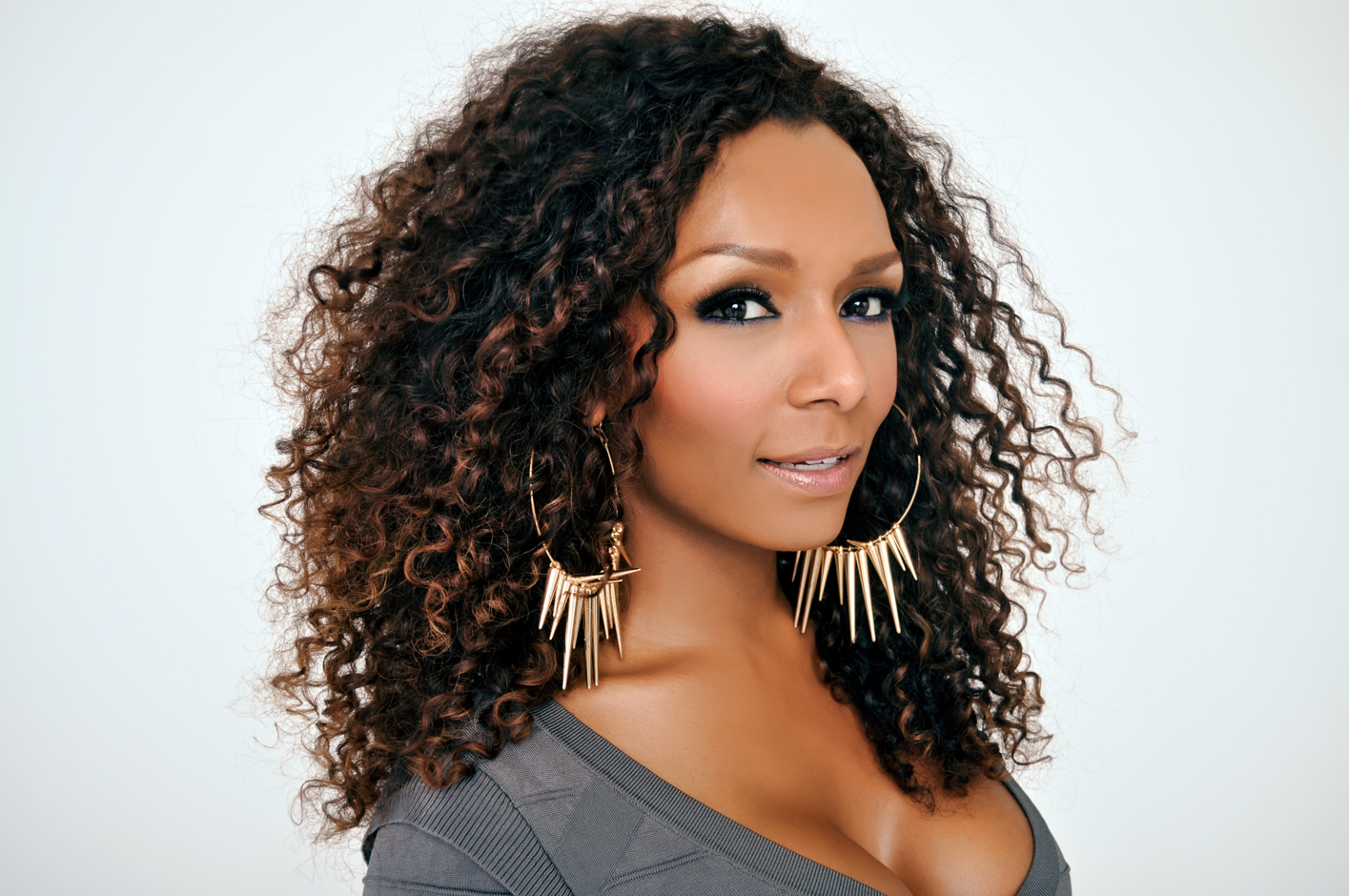

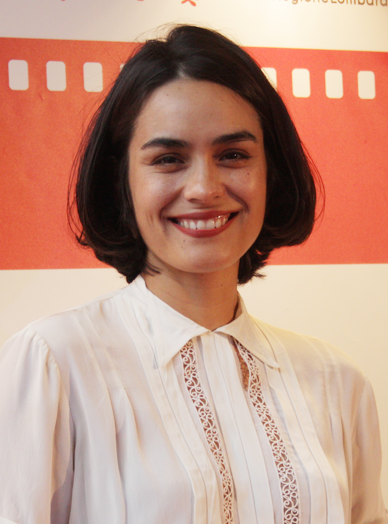

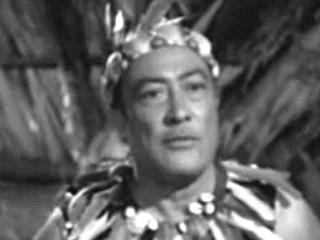

== Business ==
- William Heath Davis (1822–1909), merchant and trader; early pioneer of the city of San Diego, California

== Literature ==
- Kaui Hart Hemmings, novelist, author of The Descendants (2007)
- George Kanahele (1930–2000), author of books about Native Hawaiians, activist
- Kirby Wright, novelist and poet

== Media and journalism ==
- Jeff Chang, journalist, author and music critic; of Hawaiian-Chinese ancestry

== Music ==
- Kealii Blaisdell (born 1972), musician of Native Hawaiian music
- Don Ho (1930–2007), entertainer, musician, best known for the song "Tiny Bubbles"
- Hoku Ho (born 1981), Bubblegum pop singer
- Mark Keali'i Ho'omalu (born 1959), musician, contemporary Hawaiian chanter and kumu hula
- Anuhea Jenkins (born 1985), singer-songwriter, musician
- Dick Jensen (1942–2006), rhythm and blues, soul, and gospel singer and actor
- Israel Kamakawiwoʻole (1959–1997), musician, singer-songwriter, and Hawaiian sovereignty activist
- Irmgard Farden Aluli (1911–2001), prominent composer
- Keali'i Reichel (born 1962), singer-songwriter, musician
- Mary Kaye (1924–2007), musician, guitarist, singer
- Kūkahi (born 1999), musician, singer-songwriter, record producer
- Eric Lee, musician, singer-songwriter, and record producer
- Joey Moe (born 1985), hip hop and pop singer and producer; Danish-Hawaiian descent
- Ruban Nielson (born 1980), musician, New Zealand singer-songwriter and musician
- Gabby Pahinui (1921–1980), slack-key guitarist and singer
- Dennis Pavao (1951–2002), Hawaiian falsetto singer and musician; one of several Hawaiian musicians who during the 1970s, led the Hawaiian music renaissance
- Kalani Peʻa (born 1983), Grammy award-winning singer, songwriter, entertainer, and educator
- Marlene Sai (born 1941), Hawaiian classic-style female solo singer, actress
- Brendon Urie (born 1987), lead singer of Panic! at the Disco
Native Hawaiians in music

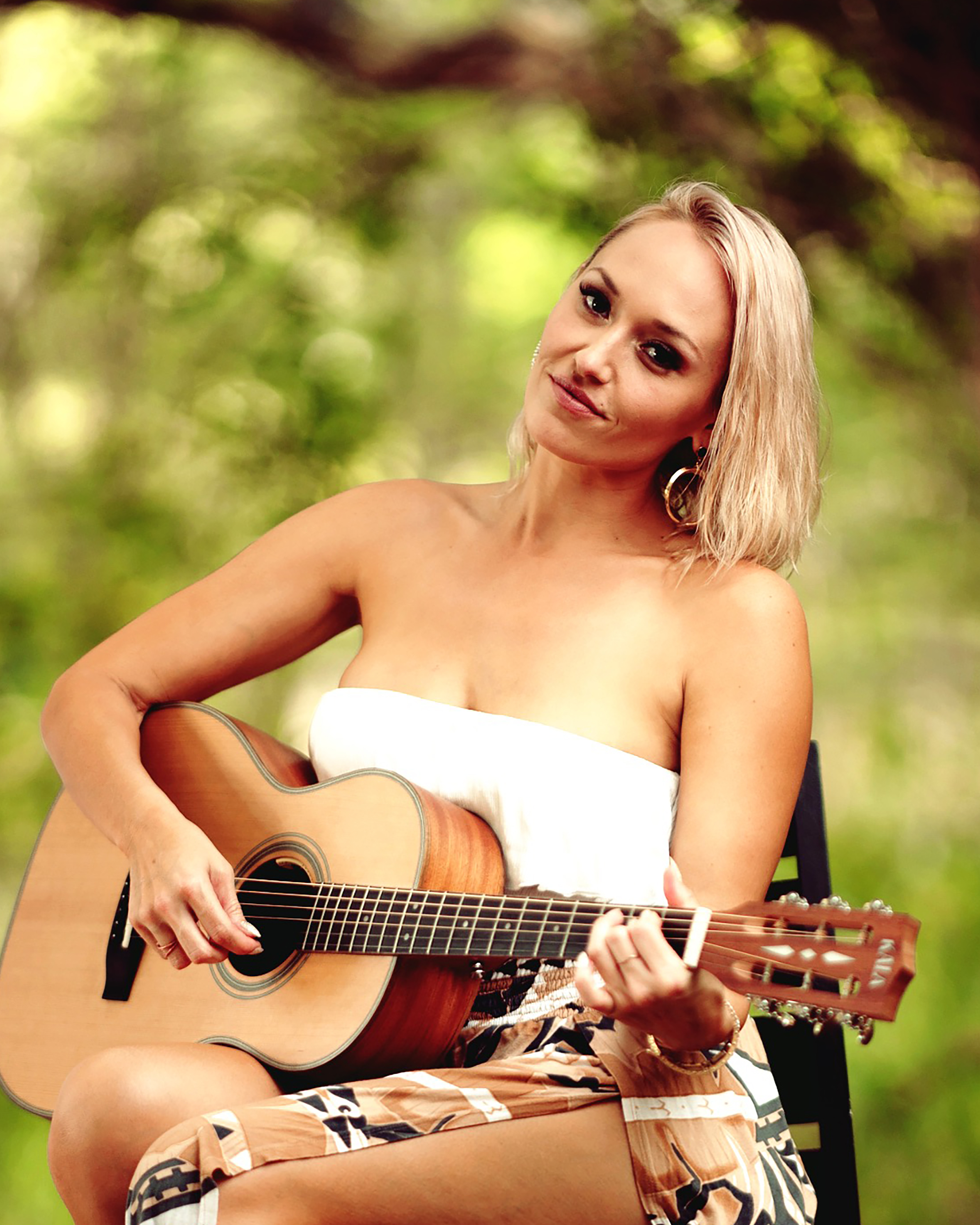

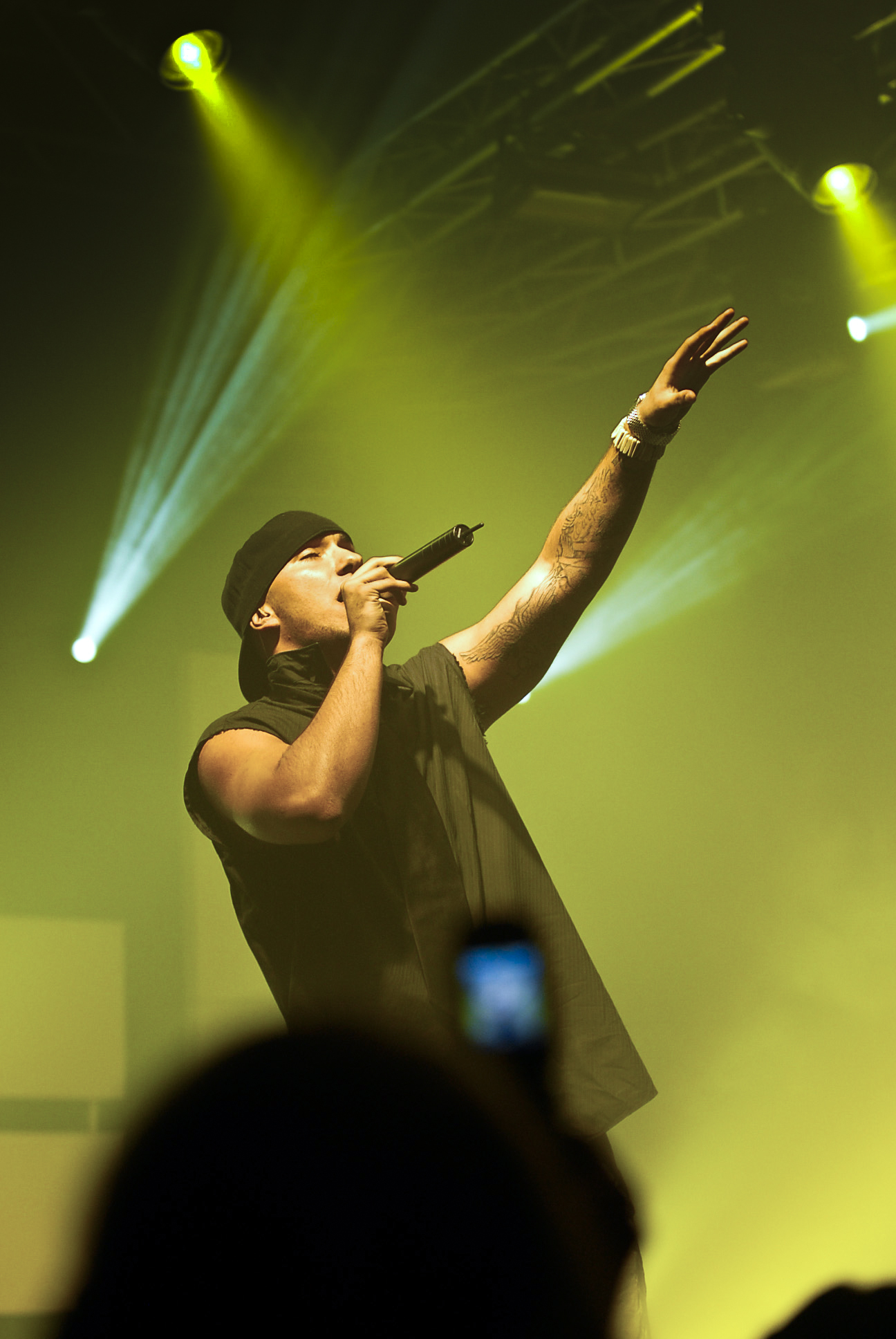

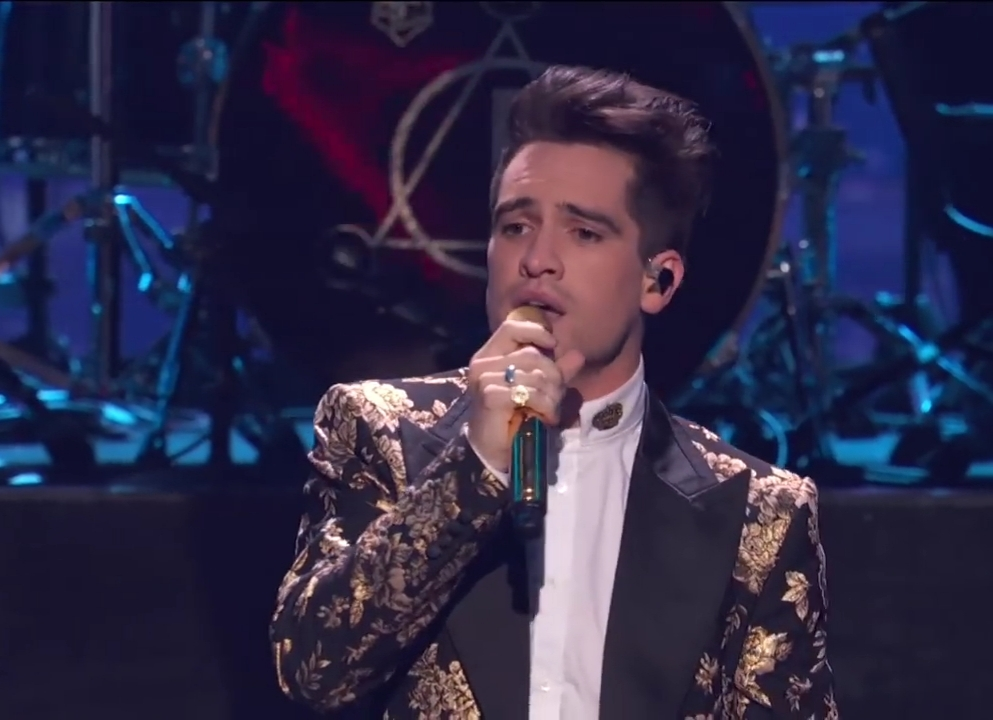

== Politics, military, and civil service ==
- Duke Aiona (born 1955), politician, 10th lieutenant governor of Hawaii 2002–2010
- Daniel K. Akaka (1924–2018), politician, United States senator from Hawaii 1990–2013
- D. G. Anderson (born 1930), politician, real estate developer and businessman; Hawai'i State House of Representatives 1962–1966; Hawai'i state senator 1967–1983
- S. Haunani Apoliona, banker, activist for the Hawaiian sovereignty movement
- Gordon Chung-Hoon (1910–1979), first Native Hawaiian flag officer in the US Navy and director of the Hawaii Department of Agriculture
- Faith Evans (1937–2014), Hawaii state legislator and one of the first women to serve as a United States marshal
- Brickwood Galuteria, politician, former member of the Hawaii Senate from the 12th district 2008–2018; former radio host and actor
- Clayton Hee (born 1953), politician, member of the Hawaii Senate from the 23rd district
- Victor Stewart Kaleoaloha Houston (1876–1959), politician, delegate to the U.S. House of Representatives from Hawaii territory's at-large district 1927– 1933
- Curtis P. Iaukea (1855–1940), politician, court official, army officer and diplomat of the Kingdom of Hawaii
- William Paul Jarrett (1877–1929), politician, delegate to Congress
- Kaialiʻi Kahele (born 1974), politician, member of the U.S. House of Representatives from Hawaii's 2nd district 2021–2023
- Jonah Kūhiō Kalanianaʻole (1871–1922), politician, delegate to the U.S. House of Representatives from Hawaii Territory's At-large district 1903–1922
- Quentin Kawananakoa (born 1961), politician, member of the Hawaii House of Representatives from the 26th district, great-grandson of Prince David Kawānanakoa
- James Kealoha (1908–1983), politician, first lieutenant governor of Hawaii
- Esther Kia'aina (born 1963), politician, United States Assistant Secretary of the Interior for Insular Areas 2014–2017; member of the Honolulu City Council from the 3rd district 2021–
- Samuel Wilder King (1886–1959), politician, delegate to the U.S. House of Representatives from Hawaii's at-large district 1935–1943; 11th territorial governor of Hawaii 1953–1957
- Kaleo Moylan (born 1966), 7th lieutenant governor of Guam, former member of the Guam Legislature
- Kurt Moylan (born 1939), 1st lieutenant governor of Guam, 6th Secretary of Guam
- Joseph Nawahi (1842–1896), politician, Native Hawaiian nationalist leader, legislator, lawyer, newspaper publisher, and painter
- Herbert K. Pililaau (1928–1951), United States Army soldier and a recipient of the Medal of Honor
- Henry Hoʻolulu Pitman (1845–1863), Union Army soldier, one of the "Hawaiʻi Sons of the Civil War"
- Amata Coleman Radewagen (born 1947), politician, U.S. Delegate from American Samoa, 2015–present
- William S. Richardson (1919–2010), attorney, political figure, 2nd lieutenant governor of Hawaii, and chief justice of the Hawaii State Supreme Court 1966–1982
- Myron "Pinky" Thompson (1924–2001), Native Hawaiian community leader and trustee of Bishop Estate
- Suzanne Vares-Lum (born 1967), first female Native Hawaiian general officer, and first Native Hawaiian president of East–West Center
- John D. Waiheʻe III (born 1946), politician, fourth governor of Hawaii 1986–1994
- Robert William Kalanihiapo Wilcox ("Iron Duke of Hawaiʻi"; 1855–1903), politician, delegate to Congress
Native Hawaiians in politics, military and civil service

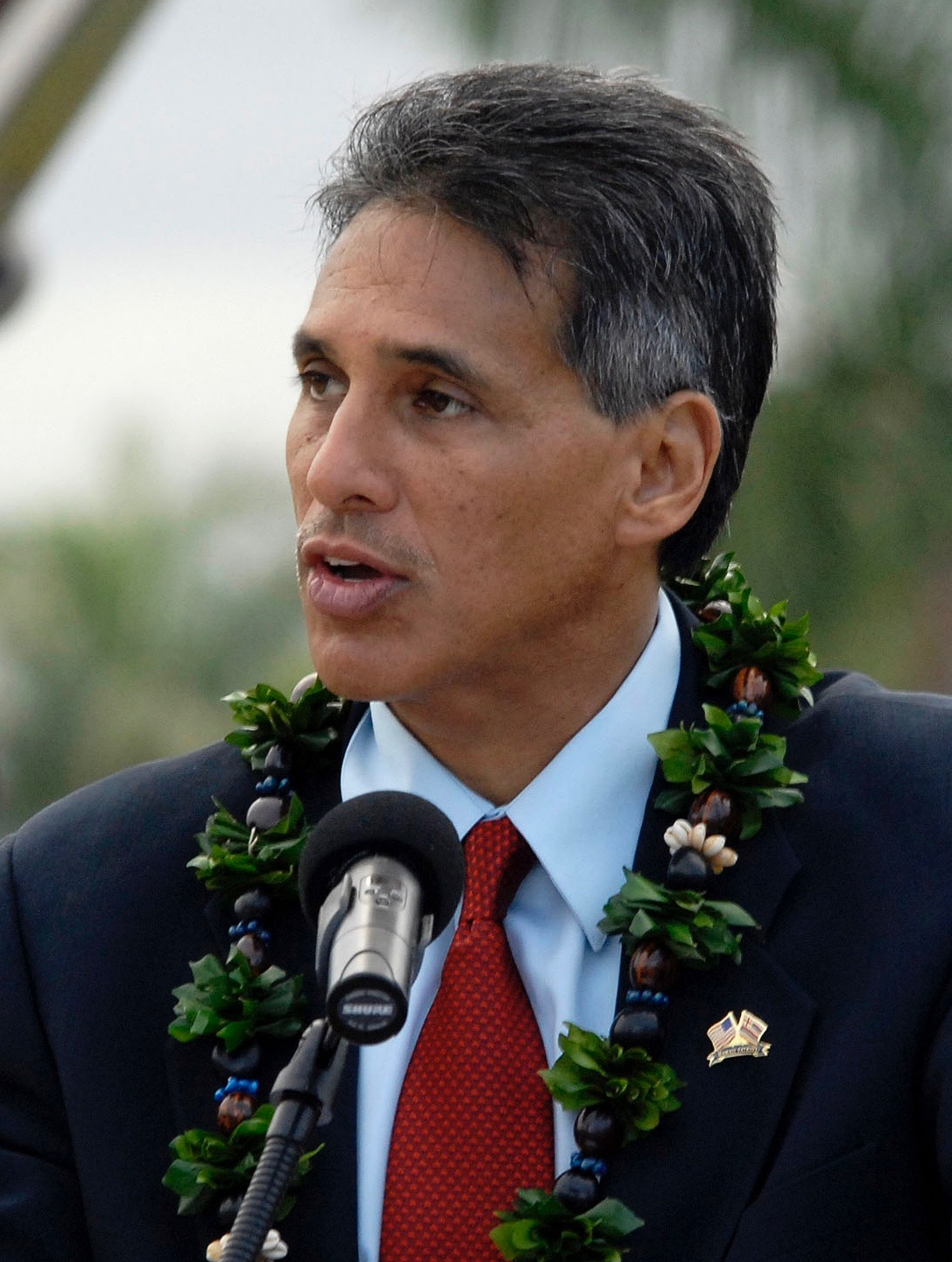

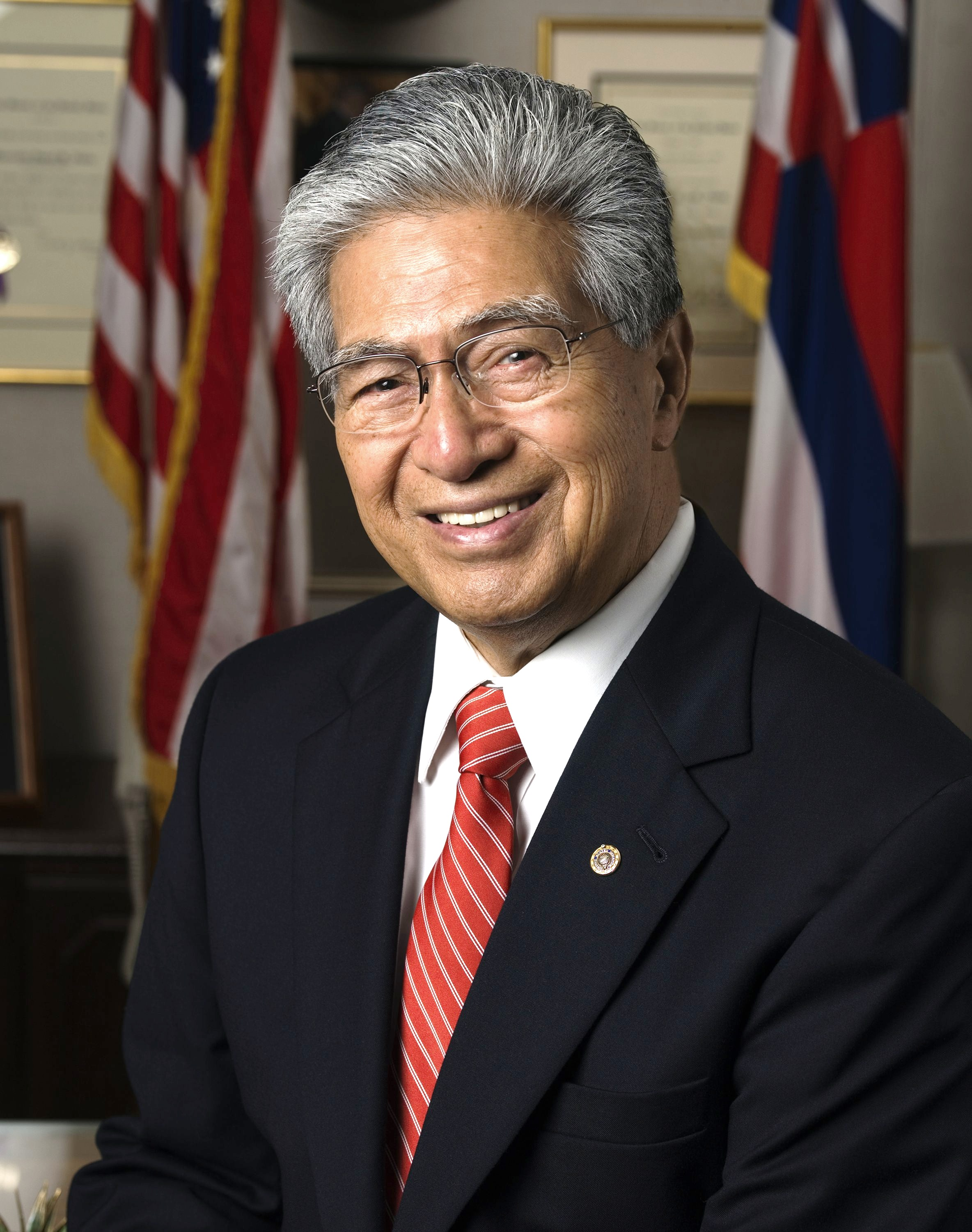

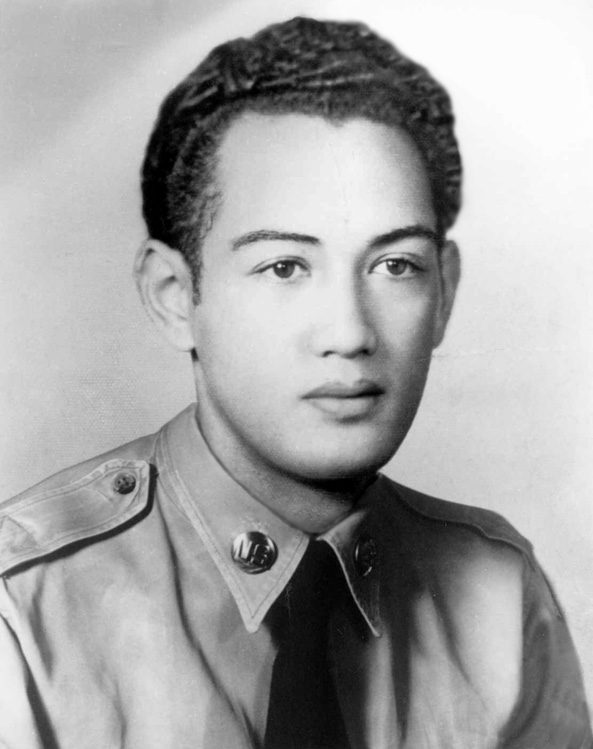

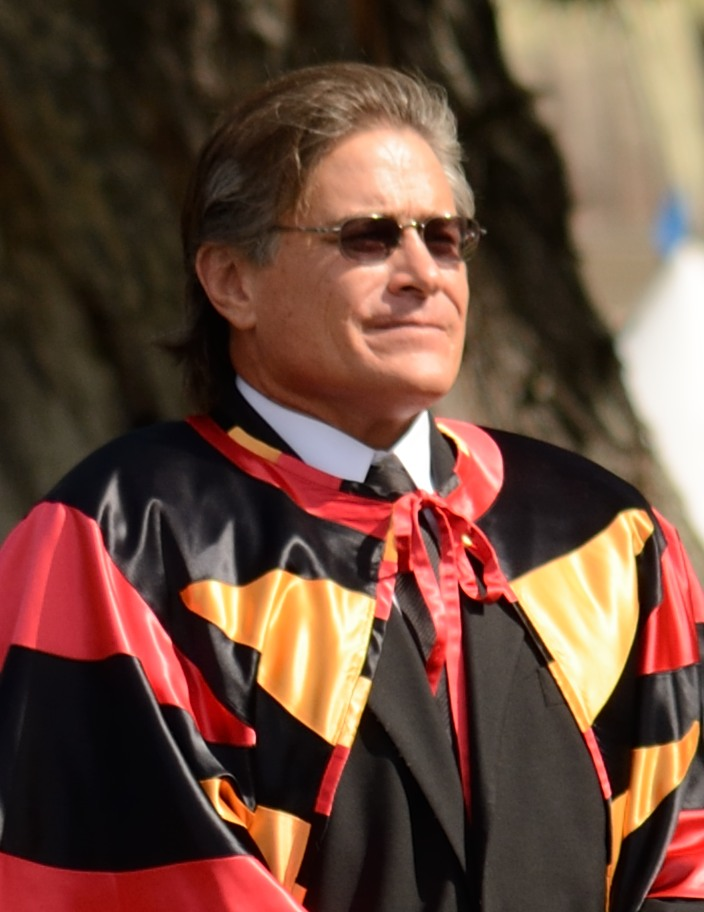

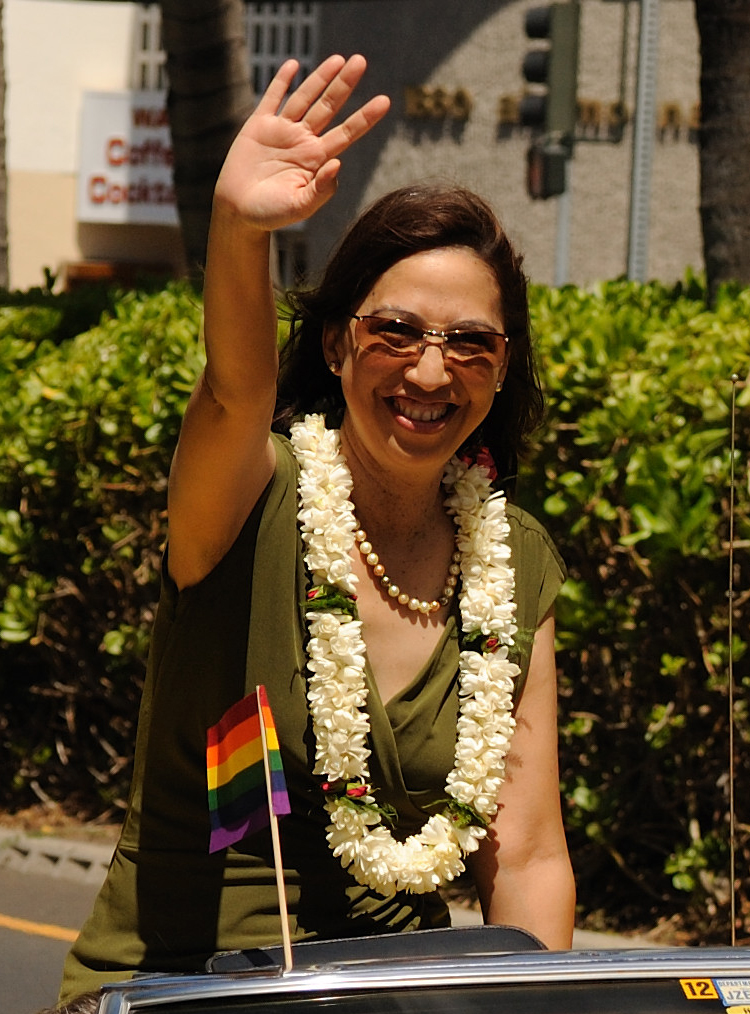

== Sports ==
- Benny Agbayani (born 1971), baseball player
- Maui Ahuna (born 2002), baseball player
- Eddie Aikau (born 1946), surfer
- Ikaika Alama-Francis (born 1984), football player
- Kala Alexander (born 1969), surfer
- Jocelyn Alo (born 1998), softball player
- Travis Browne (born 1982), mixed martial artist (MMA)
- Brian Cabral (born 1956), football player and coach
- Timmy Chang (born 1981), football player and coach
- Brian Ching (born 1978), soccer player
- Madison Chock (born 1992), ice dancer
- Norm Chow (born 1946), football player and coach
- Micah Christenson (born 1993), volleyball player
- Chai Cortez (born 1998), soccer player
- Ron Darling (born 1960), baseball player
- Kamalani Dung (born 1997), softball player
- Caprice Dydasco (born 1993), soccer player
- Kaʻimi Fairbairn (born 1994), football player
- Megan Faraimo (born 2000), softball player
- Harry Field (born 1911), football player
- Joe Francis (born 1936), football player
- Jon Francis (born 1964), football player
- George Freeth (born 1883), surfer
- Makoa Freitas (born 1979), football player
- Rocky Freitas (born 1945), football player
- Harry Fujiwara (born 1934), professional wrestler and manager
- Blane Gaison (born 1958), football player
- Sunny Garcia (born 1970), surfer
- Kurt Gouveia (born 1964), football player
- Kamu Grugier-Hill (born 1994), football player
- Brandon Hardin (born 1989), football player
- Kamaka Hepa (born 2000), basketball player
- Coco Ho (born 1991), surfer
- Derek Ho (born 1964), surfer
- Mason Ho (born 1988), surfer
- Michael Ho (born 1957), surfer
- Max Holloway (born 1991), mixed martial artist (MMA)
- Michael Hoomanawanui (born 1988), football player
- David Hughes (born 1959), football player
- Henry "Honolulu" Hughes (born 1907), football player
- Kelly Inouye-Perez (born 1970), softball player and coach
- Moana Jones (born 1999), surfer
- Lovieanne Jung (born 1980), softball player
- Saige Ka'aha'aina-Torres (born 2000), volleyball player
- Kila Kaʻaihue (born 1984), baseball player
- Duke Kahanamoku (born 1890), surfer and swimmer
- Samuel Kahanamoku (born 1902), swimmer
- Sargent Kahanamoku (born 1910), swimmer
- Natasha Kai (born 1983), soccer player
- Charles Kalani Jr. (born 1930), professional wrestler
- Maiola Kalili (born 1909), swimmer
- Manuella Kalili (born 1912), swimmer
- Montgomery Kaluhiokalani (born 1958), surfer
- Jason Kapono (born 1981), basketball player
- Tom Kaulukukui (born 1913), football player and coach
- Pua Kealoha (born 1902), swimmer
- Warren Kealoha (born 1903), swimmer
- Hau'oli Kikaha (born 1992), football player
- Olin Kreutz (born 1977), football player
- Fred Kuhaulua (born 1953), baseball player
- Jesse Kuhaulua (born 1944), sumo wrestler
- Lo'eau LaBonta (born 1993), soccer player
- Trevor Larnach (born 1997), baseball player
- Keith Luuloa (born 1974), baseball player
- Micah Maʻa (born 1997), volleyball player
- Malia Manuel (born 1993), surfer
- Kalei Mau (born 1995), volleyball player
- Kevin Mawae (born 1971), football player
- Butch May (born 1941), volleyball player
- Misty May-Treanor (born 1977), volleyball player
- Tetairoa McMillan (born 2003), football player
- Yancy Medeiros (born 1987), mixed martial artist (MMA)
- Samuel Mokuahi (born 1934), professional wrestler
- Carissa Moore (born 1992), surfer
- Don Muraco (born 1949), professional wrestler
- Kai Nacua (born 1995), football player
- Puka Nacua (born 2001), football player
- Samson Nacua (born 1998), football player
- K. J. Noons (born 1982), mixed martial artist (MMA)
- David Nuuhiwa (born 1948), surfer
- Henry "Prince" Oana (born 1910), baseball player
- Kealia Ohai (born 1992), soccer player
- Danny Ongais (born 1942), race car driver
- Rachel Kealaonapua O'Sullivan (born 1950), diver
- Raquel Pa'aluhi (born 1990), mixed martial artist (MMA)
- Jeff Pahukoa (born 1969), football player
- Noah Pang-Potjes (born 1991), professional wrestler
- Dominic Raiola (born 1978), football player
- Donovan Raiola (born 1982), football player and coach
- Dylan Raiola (born 2005), football player
- Heimana Reynolds (born 1998), skateboarder
- Alohi Robins-Hardy (born 1995), volleyball player
- Chadwick Rowan (born 1969), sumo wrestler
- Bronson Sardinha (born 1983), baseball player
- Ray Schoenke (born 1941), football player
- Meleana "Mana" Shim (born 1991), soccer player
- Mana Silva (born 1988), football player
- Bill Smith (born 1924), swimmer
- Sam Staab (born 1997), soccer player
- Logan Tom (born 1981), volleyball player
- Mel Tom (born 1941), football player
- Tani Tupou (born 1992), football player and rugby player
- Shane Victorino (born 1980), baseball player
- Kimo von Oelhoffen (born 1971), football player
- Talia von Oelhoffen (born 2002), basketball player
- Zach Wilson (born 1999), football player
- Kailee Wong (born 1976), football player
- Kean Wong (born 1995), baseball player
- Kolten Wong (born 1990), baseball player
- Bill Woolsey (born 1934), swimmer
Native Hawaiians in sports

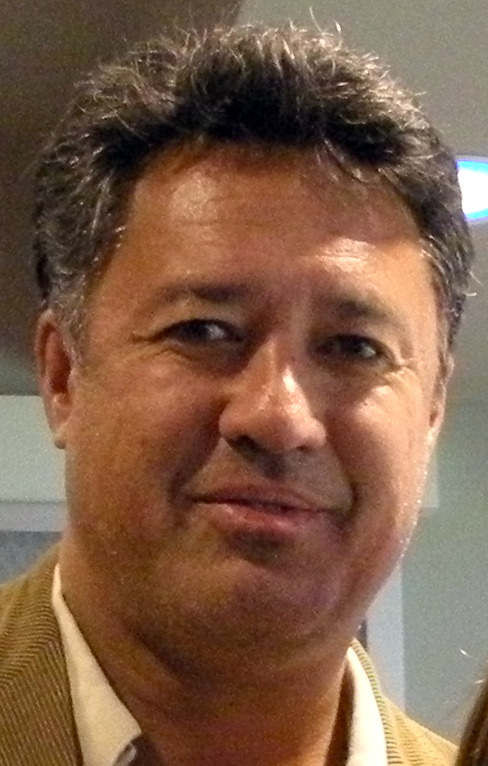

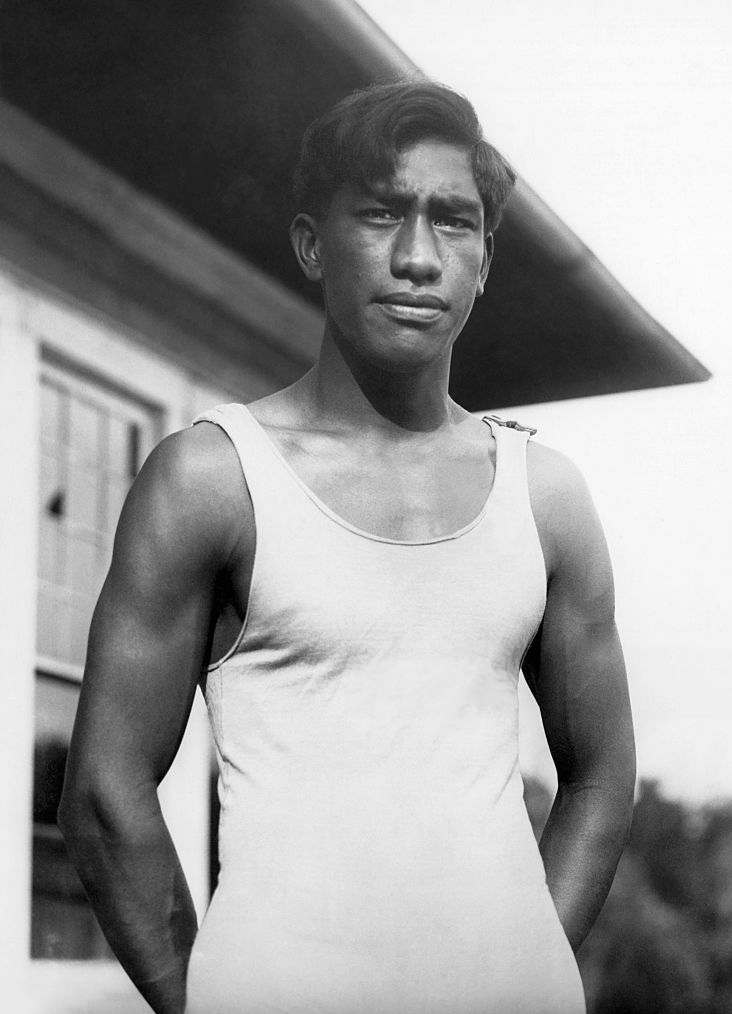

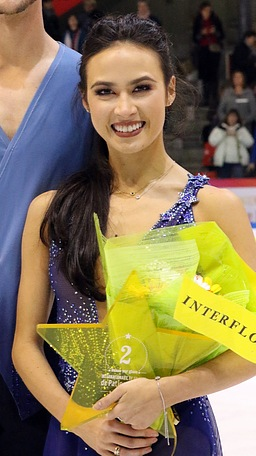

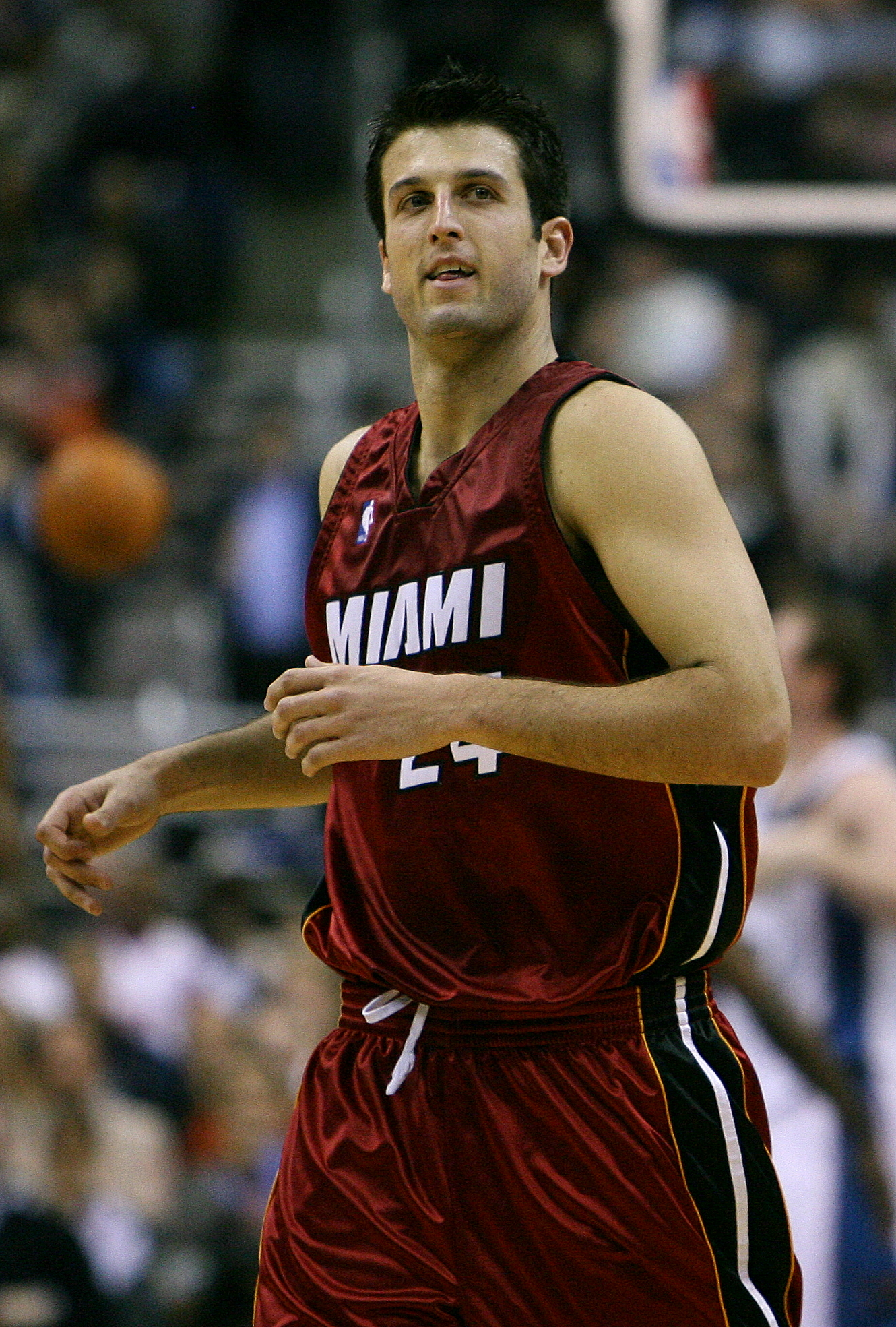

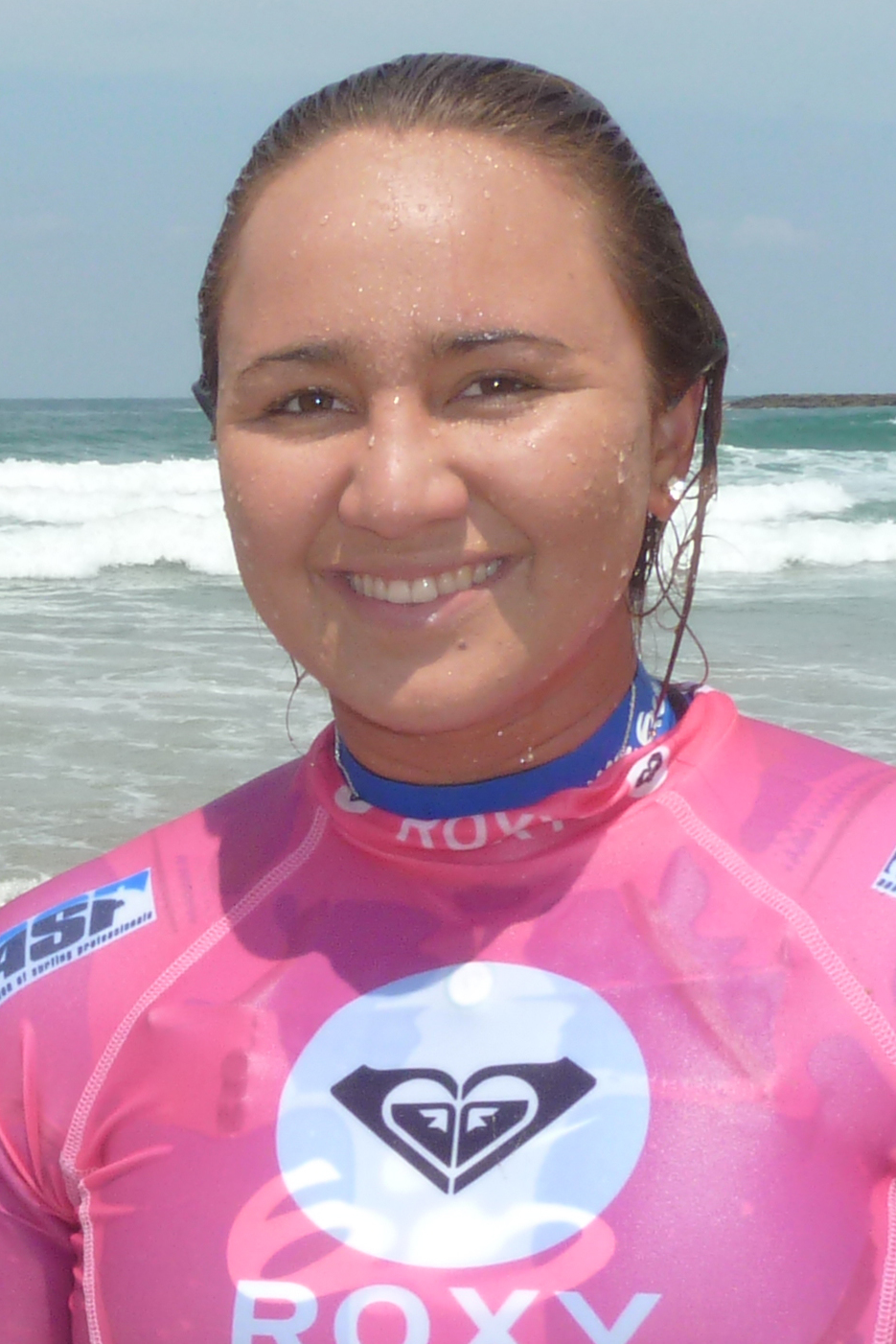

== Royalty and nobles ==
- Bernice Pauahi Bishop (1831–1884), aliʻi (nobility) of the royal family of the Kingdom of Hawaii and a well known philanthropist
- John Papa ʻĪʻī (1800–1870), ali'i (nobility), 19th-century educator, politician and historian in the Kingdom of Hawaii
- King Kalākaua (1836–1891), known as The Merrie Monarch, last king of Hawaiʻi
- Kamehameha the Great (1782–1819), first king of Hawaii
- Kaumualiʻi (c. 1778–1824), last independent aliʻi nui of Kauaʻi and Niʻihau before joining with Kamehameha I
- Princess Abigail Kawananakoa (1926–2022), descendant of aliʻi, a member of the House of Kawānanakoa
- Princess Kaʻiulani (1875–1899), daughter of Likelike, and the last heir apparent to the Hawaiian Kingdom
- Princess Likelike (1851–1887), mother of Kaʻiulani and 2nd in line of succession after her sister Liliʻuokalani
- Queen Liliʻuokalani (1838–1917), last monarch of the Kingdom of Hawaiʻi
Native Hawaiians royalty and nobles

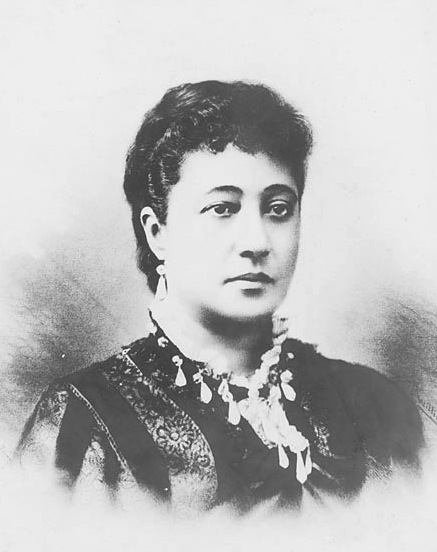

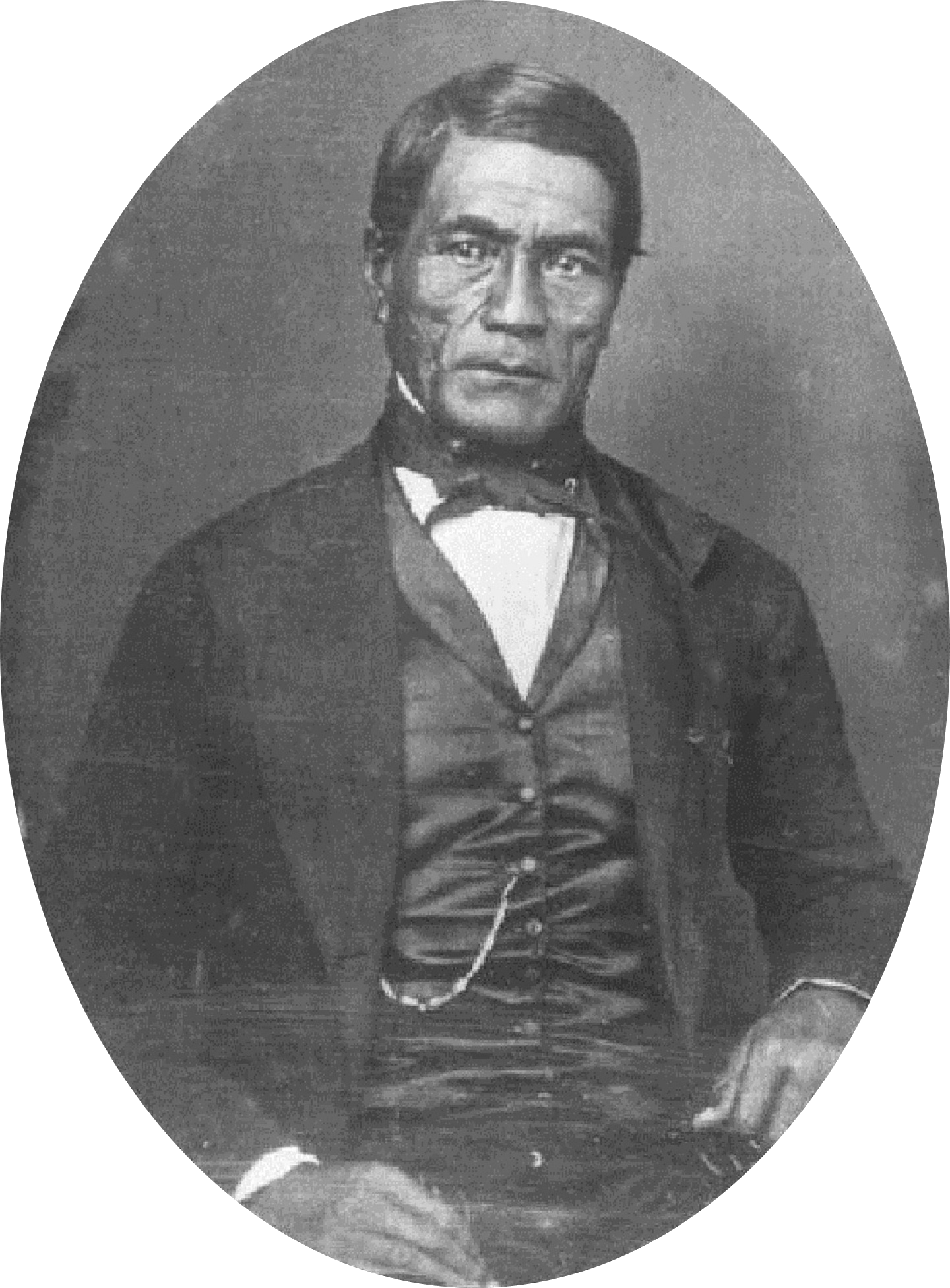

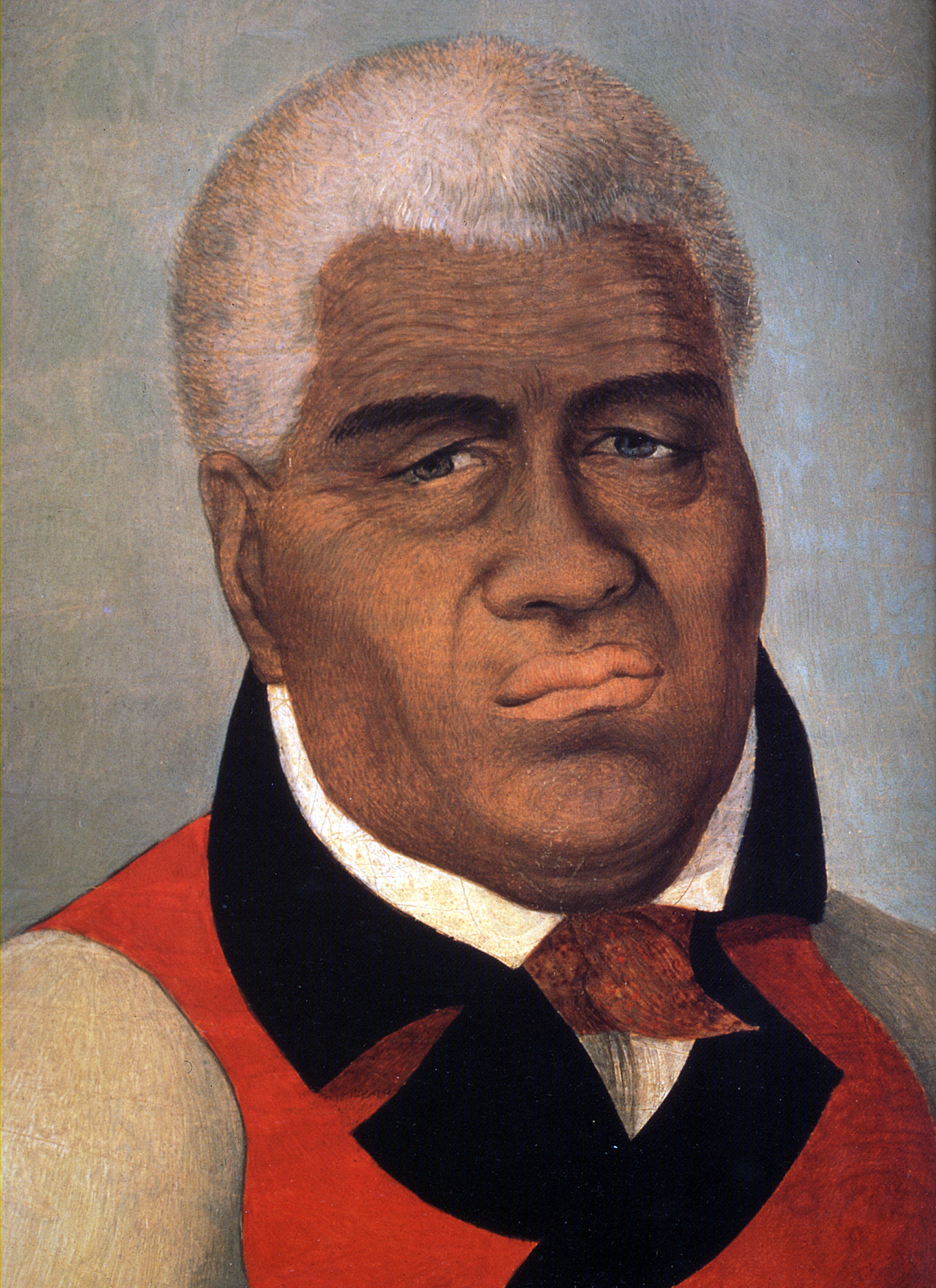

== Others ==
- Charles Kekumano (1919–1998), Roman Catholic priest and first papal chamberlain of native Hawaiian ancestry
- Helio Koaʻeloa (ca. 1815–1846), Hawaiian Catholic lay missionary, called as the "Apostle of Maui"
- Harry Maitey (1807–1872), first Hawaiian person to travel to Prussia
- Freddie Tavares (1913–1990), inventor, helped design the Fender Stratocaster and other Fender products, steel guitarist
- Mililani Trask (born 1951), leader of the Hawaiian sovereignty movement and a political speaker and attorney

== See also ==
- List of Hawaii suffragists
