= Lilia Wahinemaikaʻi Hale =

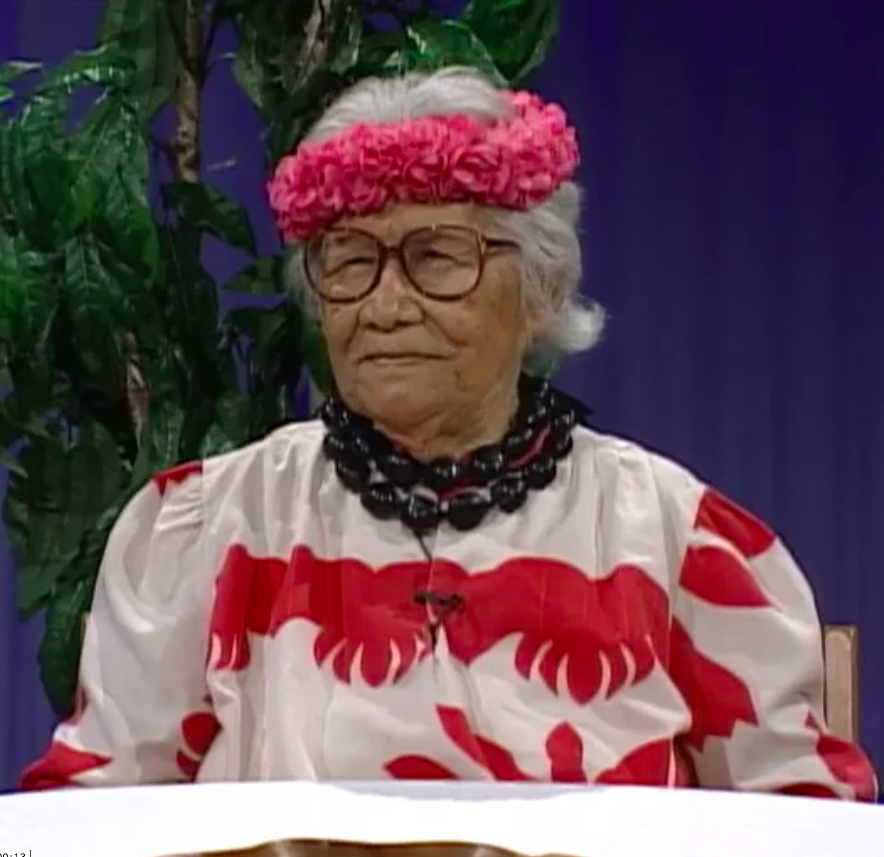
- Lilia Hale during an interview with Hailama Farden and Ipo Wong
- Born: April 20, 1913; Hawaii
- Died: June 5, 2003 (aged 90); Waimanalo, Hawaii
- Resting place: Napoopoo Bay
- Notable work: Nā ʻŌlelo Noʻeau No Nā Keiki: Words of Wisdom For Children; Nā Hulu Kohukohu: Animal Sounds in the Hawaiian Language

Lilia Wahinemaikaʻi Hale (April 20, 1913 – June 5, 2003) was a Kanaka Maoli educator, musician, and prominent champion of ʻŌlelo Hawaiʻi during the Hawaiian Language renaissance through her role as a kumu ʻōlelo Hawaiʻi, author, and as a mānaleo (native language speaker) at the University of Hawaiʻi at Mānoa.

== Life ==
=== Early childhood ===
Lilia Hale was born on April 20, 1913, in the home of Mrs. Macalton, the grandmother of Emma Veary. She was later raised in Kapālama (or what is commonly referred to as Pālama) on Insane Asylum Road, named after the mental hospital that once stood near her residence. She is the daughter of Annie Kealohanui Kanahele and Herbert Kaʻaukea Kaʻapuiki. Not much is known of her parents, as Hale was abandoned by them early in her life. She was adopted by her grandfather, Kamuela (Sam) Kanahele (January 24, 1850 – June 14, 1937) who spoke to her only in Hawaiian and taught her Hawaiian values along with a strong devotion to God. Kanahele, who was a construction worker by trade also was a kahu at Kaumakapili Church as well as on Molokaʻi. Kanahele composed the song Pauoa Liko Lehua for his wife Elizabeth Kaukeano Kanahele (August 15, 1865 – October 20, 1922). He was involved in the construction of the first church of Kalaupapa.Hale was a devout member of the Seventh-day Adventist Church.

As a child, Hale would paddle with her grandparents to visit families with Hansens disease and bring them fresh fruit. Following the death of her grandmother, she lived with her relatives in Molokaʻi, Maui, Waiohinu and various other locations until her grandfather remarried and could care for her.

Hale attended Central Grammar School, or what is now known as Central Middle School. Like many other Hawaiians in her time period, she was forbidden from speaking Hawaiian in school. During her first day at Central, her teacher urged her to respond to Lydia instead of Lilia, which was Hawaiian for lily. When Hale would refuse, she would be beaten by her teacher as a form of punishment for speaking Hawaiian. This was a traumatic and influential memory that inspired her advocacy in preserving the language.

=== Later years ===
Hale lived the rest of her life in Waimānalo. She was married twice, had 24 grandchildren, 63 great-grandchildren, and 16 great-great-grandchildren. She died at home in Waimānalo, surrounded by family members. At her request, her ashes were scattered at Napoopoo Bay on the Big Island.

== Career ==
In the 1970s, Hale began teaching Hawaiian language at Hālau Likolaulani o Hawaiʻi in Waimānalo.

=== Alu Like Inc. ===
Hale was involved with Alu Like Inc., a private, non-profit organization with a focus on supporting Native Hawaiian efforts to achieve social and economic self-sufficiency.

Hale travelled to Washington, D.C., along with Haunani Apoliona and Myrtle Hilo to appear before Congress to advocate for a program to feed Native Hawaiian elders 60 years and older. The program, named Ke Ola Pono No Nā Kūpuna (Good Health and Living for the Elderly) sought to bring Hawaiian elders together and to encourage them to share stories, crafts, and arts. They were successful in this endeavor, and were able to receive funds for the program. The successful attempt impressed the former Hawaiʻi senator Daniel Inouye who supported the three women in their efforts to secure funding.

When offered compensation for her efforts to support the organization she quickly refused, stating that it would be inappropriate to be compensated for giving back to the elders what was lost to them.

=== Department of Education ===
In the 1980s, Hale alongside her former student Robert Lokomaikaʻi Snakenberg were crucial in the creation of the Hawaiian Studies Program for the Hawaiʻi State Department of Education. The Hawaiian Language Immersion Program was established shortly after. The program was sponsored by the Joint Residence Hawaiian Language Committee and the Queen Liliʻuokalani Children's Center. The program was to be community-based and community-sponsored and based on Hawaiian language and culture. Hale was particularly essential in implementing the kūpuna (elder) component of the program, emphasizing the importance of learning from kūpuna.

Early stages of the program took place in pilot schools on the Windward side of Oʻahu. Hale, along with other Hawaiian elders visited the aforementioned schools to teach children about the language, share stories, and nurture their education and growth.

=== University of Hawaiʻi at Mānoa ===
Hale worked as a cultural research specialist at the University of Hawaiʻi Department of Hawaiian and Indo-Pacific Languages and Literatures.

== Work ==
=== Publications ===
Hale co-authored Nā ʻŌlelo Noʻeau No Nā Keiki: Words of Wisdom For Children and Nā Hulu Kohukohu: Animal Sounds in the Hawaiian Language with Kimo Armitage, a close friend and former student of hers. Her strong affection for children inspired her to publish several children stories.

=== Interviews ===
Eddie Kamae and his spouse Myrna Kamae produced the 1998 documentary Hawaiian Voices: Bridging Past to Present, which featured three distinguished Hawaiian elders (Ruth Makaila Kaholoaʻa, Reverend David "Kawika" Kaʻalakea, and Hale) who were prominent in bridging traditional Hawaiian knowledge into the late 20th century through their unique perspectives.

Hale was a guest on Ka Leo Hawaiʻi (The Hawaiian Voice), a radio segment from the early 1970s on KCCN that was hosted by Larry Kimura. The segment featured prominent Hawaiian language figures like John Kameaaloha Almeida and was conducted exclusively in Hawaiian language.
