= Kimo =

Kimo may refer to:

- Kimo, a village in Oravais, Finland
- KiMo Theater, Albuquerque, USA
- Chery A1, a car, also known as "Kimo" in Russia
- KYUR, television station based in Anchorage, Alaska known as KIMO from 1971 until 2010
- Kimo Yeti (born c. 1935), Huaorani tribesman of Ecuador
- Kimo, a common Hawaiian name translated to "Jim" or "James", see Hawaiian name
- Kimo Armitage, American poet, children's book author, playwright and videographer

== Music ==
- Kimo (band), New Zealand music group
- Kimo Proudfoot, American director of music videos
- Kimo Wilder McVay (1927–2001), musician turned talent manager
- Kimo Williams, American musician

== Sports ==
- Rosey (wrestler), professional wrestler who worked under the name Kimo
- Kimo Leopoldo (born 1968), mixed martial artist often billed as just Kimo
- Kimo von Oelhoffen (born 1971), American football player
