= Keolu Fox =

American geneticist

Patrick Keolu Fox
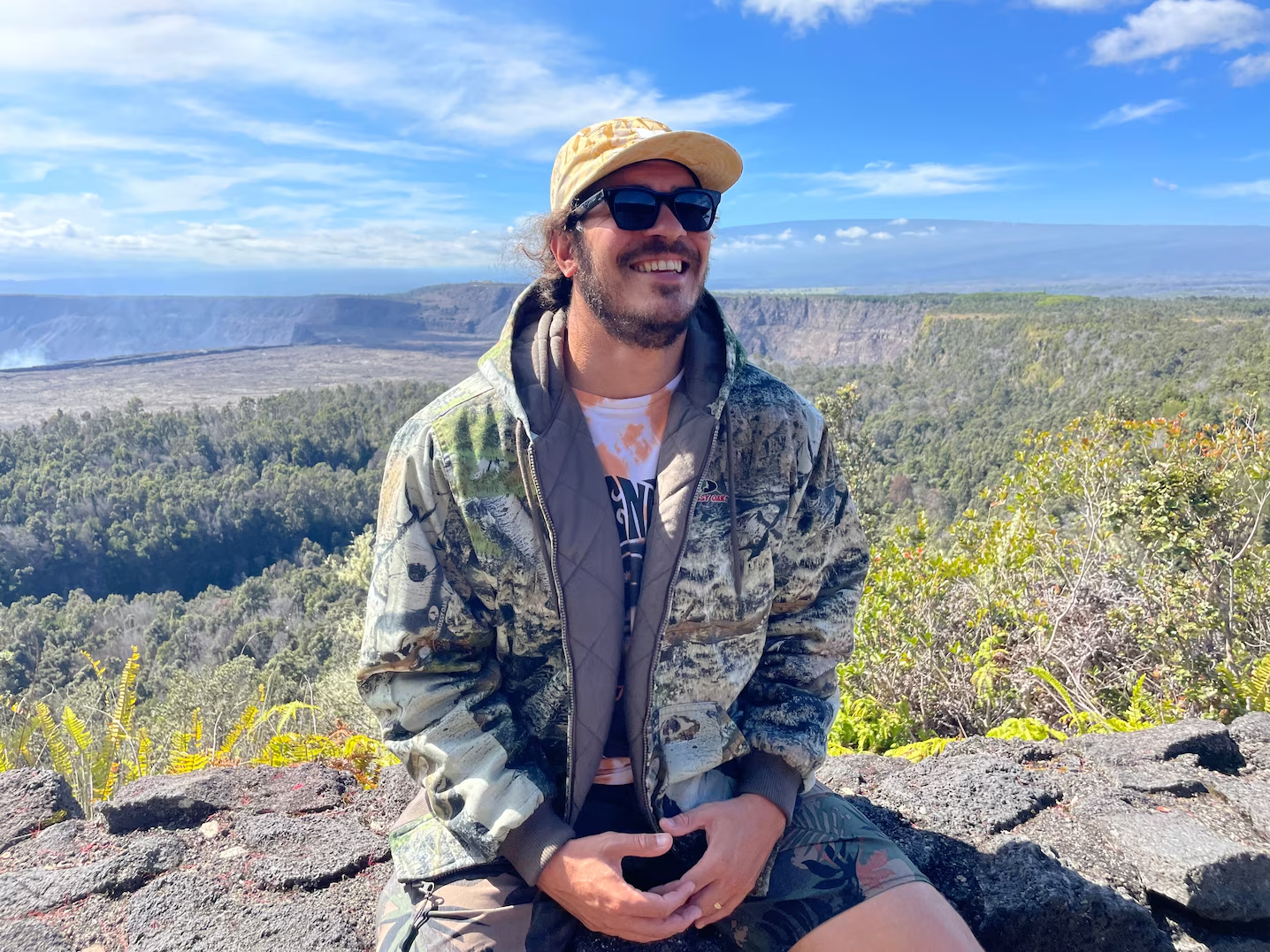
- Fox in 2021
- Occupations: Geneticist,anthropologist

Academic background
- Education: Maryland (BA); Washington (PhD)
- Thesis: Next Generation ABO Genetics and Genomics hdl:1773/38148 (2016)
- Doctoral advisor: Debbie Nickerson

Academic work
- Institutions: University of California, San Diego

Patrick Keolu Fox is an American anthropologist and geneticist whose research includes human genomics, evolutionary genetics, and Indigenous data sovereignty. He is an associate professor of anthropology at the University of California, San Diego (UC San Diego) and is an investigator at the J. Craig Venter Institute.

Fox had advocated for indigenous data sovereignty and the participation by Indigenous communities in genetic research, including community control over data and samples that are collected for use in genetic research.

He has been an advocate for the community-based participatory research model as a strategy for increasing collaboration between the field of genetics and Indigenous communities. He has also examined the potential use of data trusts, federated machine intelligence, and blockchain technologies for Indigenous data sovereignty.

== Education and academic career ==
Fox received a BA in anthropology from the University of Maryland in 2008, and PhD from the University of Washington's Department of Genome Sciences in 2016.

== Research ==
Fox's research has addressed human genetic variation, evolutionary genetics, and the relationship between genomic research and Indigenous communities.

His doctoral research included an analysis of structural variation in the ABO gene using sequencing data from individuals of African ancestry.

In a 2024 TED Talk, Fox discussed researchers who are exploring the concept of using plant DNA as a storage medium.

Fox published a study that gave genetic evidence that people from Easter Island settled Hawaii.

== Indigenous activism ==
Fox has written and spoken about the inclusion and protection of indigenous communities in genomic research, including questions of access to genetic data, and informed consent. He has proposed that Indigenous peoples receive compensation of at least four percent of the revenue from drugs developed using their genetic information.

In 2020, Fox critiqued parts of the NIH's All of Us program arguing that genomic research projects needed strong protections and guardrails for participants of Indigenous origin.

Fox is a co-founder of the Native BioData Consortium, which is an organization that address Indigenous governance of genomic data and storage of genetic material.
