= Kūkahi =

American singer-songwriter

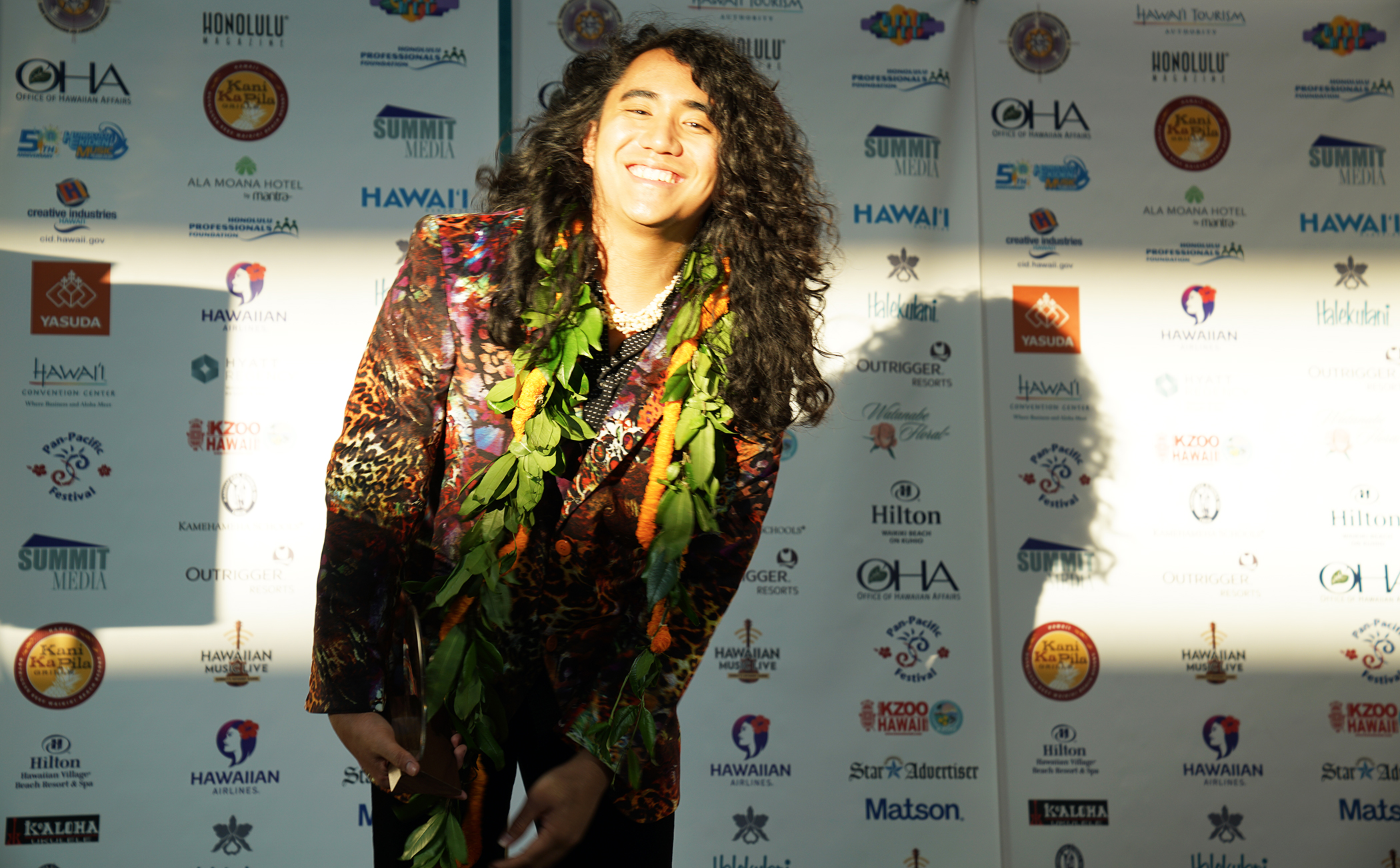
- Kūkahi at the 40th Annual Nā Hōkū Hanohano Awards Ceremony in 2017

Background information
- Born: Kūkahi Allan Nuʻuanu Lee; July 29, 1999 (age 26); Honolulu, Hawaii, U.S.
- Genres: Pop; pop rock; alternative rock
- Occupations: Singer-songwriter; multi-instrumentalist; record producer
- Instruments: Vocals; guitar; bass; drums; percussion; harmonica; piano; keyboard; synthesizer; drum machine; sampler; ukulele
- Years active: 2015–present
- Labels: Makaliʻi Productions
- Website: brandspankingku.com

Kūkahi Allan Nu’uanu Lee (July 29, 1999), professionally known mononymously as Kūkahi (/ˈkuːkɑːhiː/), is a Native Hawaiian singer-songwriter, multi-instrumentalist, and record producer. Born and raised in Honolulu, Hawaii, Kūkahi began writing music at a young age and performed in musical venues around the world throughout his early teens. After graduating from high school in 2015, he founded an independent record label that is distributed and funded by Makaliʻi Productions.

In 2017, his eponymous debut won a Nā Hōkū Hanohano Award for Alternative Album of the Year. At the age of 17, he became the youngest solo artist in history to be endowed with a Nā Hōkū Hanohano Award.

Kūkahi released an EP entitled, Raw, at the age of 15, and composed and arranged his debut album, Kukahi the same year. "Kukahi" was released when he was 16-years-old. At the age of 17, he released his second album, Human. His release party was held at the Record Parlour in Hollywood, California.

== Life and career ==
=== 1999–2017: Early life and musical beginnings ===
Kūkahi Lee was born on July 29, 1999, in Honolulu, Hawaii to Shane and Monica Lee. The self-taught multi-instrumentalist was born and raised in Makaha, Makakilo, Kahala and Honolulu on the island of O'ahu, and wrote his first song at the age of 7. He moved to the Big Island when he was fourteen years old and lived in Pu’uanahulu before his family settled down in Waimea. It was there that he was inspired to compose and arrange original music.

At the age of 14, Kūkahi started a band called The German Asparagus and performed both original music and covers along with his bandmate in various places on the Big Island.

In 2015 at the age of 15, Kūkahi released an EP titled, Raw. The five song collection was given away to online listeners as a free and downloadable album.

His first full-length album, Kukahi was released in 2016 under the label, Makali'i Productions when the artist was 16. It was nominated for a 2017 Nā Hōkū Hanohano Award, and ultimately won in the Alternative Album of the Year category. In a Hawaii News Now Sunrise interview with Billy V, he stated that the album was an experimentation of texture and sounds.

Human is an LP released on May 5, 2017. The album was inspired by social issues and drew from the theme "togetherness". It was composed and arranged around various feelings of love, angst, encouragement, compassion, and anger and its refreshing lyrics are meant to bring mankind together and remind everyone that we are all human.

== Artistry ==
=== Influences ===
Kūkahi has cited Michael Jackson as an influence.

My musical hero is Michael Jackson, I like how he wrote his own songs and how he danced. He was a big influence on me.

== Other ventures ==
=== Charity ===
Kūkahi has stated that he believes in helping others and giving back to the community and has volunteered to entertain for charitable events. He performed for Habitat for Humanity on his 17th birthday and told an interviewer that this was the best present he could have received. He also performed for Laulima Giving Program (a partnership between KHON2 and Keiki o ka Aina Family Learning Centers to help people in need) in December 2016 during their Laulima Day.

== Discography ==
- Kūkahi (2016)
- Human (2017)
- Nothing Compares (EP) 2017
- Jam (2018)

== See also ==
- List of Native Hawaiians
