= Cliff Kapono =

Hawaiian surfer, journalist, and scientist

Cliff Kapono is a Native Hawaiian professional surfer, journalist, and marine conservation scientist. He is known for his research that combines his interests.

== Education ==
Kapono earned his PhD at the University of California, San Diego at the Skaggs School of Pharmacy.

== Career ==
As a surfer, a scientist, and a Native Hawaiian, Kapono's work focuses on ocean conservation and sustainability. He says that research is part of both his career and his identity. “Science is very powerful in that way to me, as an indigenous person, because it can help to communicate an idea that we have spent thousands of years trying to formulate...For me, the two spaces are completely connected, completely intertwined," he told The Surfer's Journal. Kapono says that surfing has been in his family for 90 generations.

One of his best-known projects is the Surfer Biome Project, where he studied the microbiome of surfers around the world. Kapono currently studies coral health at the University of Hawaiʻi at Hilo.

Kapono is an ambassador for the Save the Waves Coalition and several other ocean conservation non-profit organizations, as well as for-profit surfing brands. He has been profiled in several surfing outlets, including Surfer Magazine and The Surfer's Journal. Kapono also has a YouTube channel, where he posts videos about scientists and surfers alike.

In 2019, he was featured in a national commercial advertising Hawaii as a travel destination.

In their 2024 TED talk in Vancouver, BC, Kapono and Dr. Keolu Fox explored using plant DNA as a storage medium, envisioning eco-friendly systems replacing data centers. Drawing on Indigenous knowledge and biotechnology, they proposed a sustainable approach to managing global data demands. The talk blended scientific innovation with ecological responsibility, offering a glimpse of nature-powered data infrastructure.

== Selected honors and awards ==
- Native Hawaiian Scholar, University of Hawaii at Manoa
- ChangeMaker, University of California, San Diego, 2018
- Wave Saver of the Year, Save the Waves Coalition, 2018
- John Kelly Awards (Surfer/Waterperson), Surfrider O'ahu, 2018
- Featured Speaker, Society for the Advancement of Chicanos/Hispanics and Native Americans in Science, 2019
- Island Ambassador, 2019
