= Solomon Enos =

Native Hawaiian Artist

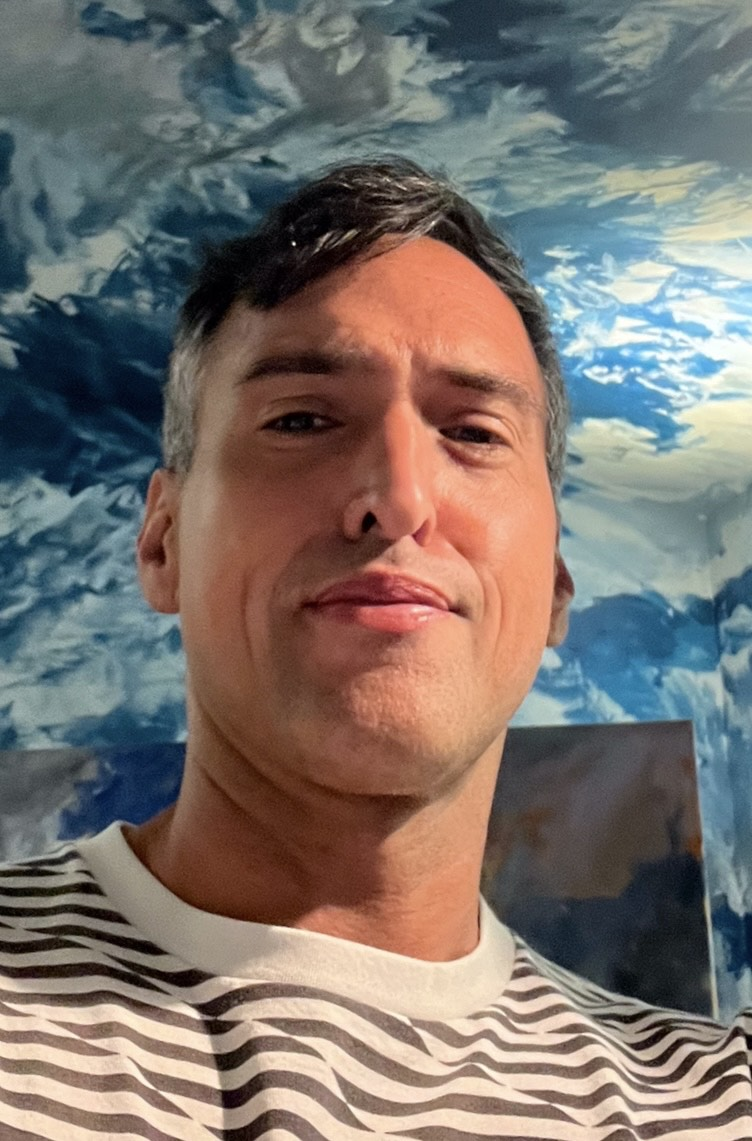
- Born: Mākaha Valley
- Occupations: Artist, illustrator, writer
- Website: www.solomonenos.com

Solomon Enos is a Native Hawaiian artist, illustrator, and activist. Enos has had their work displayed at the National Museum of the American Indian and Bernice Pauahi Bishop Museum.

== Life ==
Enos was born in the Makaha Valley to Eric and Shelly Enos. Eric Enos was an artist and cultural practitioner who founded the Ka‘ala Cultural Learning Center. Shelly Enos worked at Wai‘anae Coast Comprehensive Health Center. Enos has three brothers, Kamuela, Kanoe, and Kanohi. In 2010, Kamuela Enos was named as commissioner for President Obama’s Advisory Committee for Asian Americans and Pacific Islanders.

== Works ==
In 2004, Enos' illustrated Kimo Armitage's book Akua Hawai`i (The Gods and Goddesses of Hawai`i), which was published through Bishop Museum Press. In 2006, Enos illustrated the Epic Tales of Hi`iakaikapoliopele, which was published through Awaiaulu Press. In May 2011, Enos' work was displayed by the National Museum of the American Indian in a multisite exhibit titled "This IS Hawai‘i." In 2016, Enos was featured in the Smithsonian Asian Pacific American Center's event "CTRL+ALT: A Culture Lab on Imagined Futures." In 2017, Enos was awarded a $25,000 grant from the Joan Mitchell Foundation. Enos also completed a public mural in Thomas Square. In 2019, a mural that Enos had made in collaboration with five other artists was featured in the Bernice Pauahi Bishop Museum's exhibition Unreal: Hawai‘i in Popular Imagination. In 2020, Enos was a speaker for the 2020 Hawai'i Climate Conference. In 2022, Enos had their first exhibition at the Hawaiian Center Art Gallery. They also spoke at a virtual event hosted by the Hawaii State Public Library System called "Hawaiian Sci-fi with Solomon Enos." From July 2022 to May 2023, a series of Enos' paintings titled "Mo‘olelo Archetypes" were on display at the Pitt River Museum in Oxford, England. The paintings from "Mo‘olelo Archetypes" focused on the epiic Hawaiian myth of Hiʻiakaikapoliopele. From January 17 to March 18, 2023, Enos' work was featured alongside nine other artists including Bernice Akamine in an exhibit titled ‘Ike Kanaka at the Maui Arts & Cultural Center's Schaefer International Gallery.
