= Deborah Nickerson =

American human genomics researcher (1954–2021)

Deborah Ann Nickerson
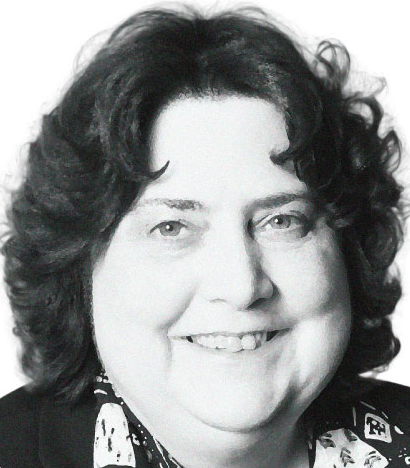
- Portrait of Nickerson, date unknown
- Born: 1954; Mineola, New York, United States
- Died: December 24, 2021 (aged 67); Seattle, Washington, United States
- Education: Adelphi University (BS, 1974); University of Tennessee (PhD, 1978)
- Scientific career
- Fields: Genomics
- Workplaces: University of South Florida, California Institute of Technology, University of Washington

Deborah Ann Nickerson (1954 – December 24, 2021) was an American human genomics researcher. She was professor of genome sciences at the University of Washington. Nickerson founded and directed of one of the five clinical sites of the Gregor Consortium and was a major contributor to many genomics projects, including the Human Genome Project and the International HapMap Project.

== Biography ==
Nickerson was born in Mineola, New York. She earned a bachelor's degree in biology from Adelphi University in 1974 and completed a PhD in immunology at the University of Tennessee in 1978. From 1978 to 1979, she pursued a postdoctoral fellowship in infectious diseases at the University of Kentucky. She worked at the University of South Florida and the California Institute of Technology with Leroy Hood, before being recruited by Hood to the University of Washington in 1992. Nickerson was a founding member of the University of Washington Department of Genome Sciences in 2001.

Nickerson died of abdominal cancer in Seattle, Washington on December 24, 2021.

== Work ==
Nickerson's work focused on the application of genomic technologies to understand genetic variation underlying human health and disease, and advanced the idea of cataloging human genomic diversity to improve genetic discoveries and diagnoses.

Notable work by Nickerson's group included illuminating of the pharmacogenomics of warfarin dosing, and producing early catalogs of normal human genomic variation. Using exome sequencing, Nickerson also identified the gene for Miller syndrome with her colleagues Michael Bamshad and Jay Shendure. The study was the first to illustrate the practicality of using genomic technologies to identify the genes underlying rare Mendelian disorders by studying a small number of unrelated affected individuals.

== Selected publications ==
- Nickerson, D.A.; Tobe, V.O.; Taylor, S.L. (1997). "PolyPhred: Automating the detection and genotyping of single nucleotide substitutions using fluorescence-based resequencing". Nucleic Acids Research. 25 (14): 2745–2751. doi:10.1093/nar/25.14.2745. PMC 146817. PMID 9207020.
- Ng, S.B.; Turner, E.H.; Robertson, P.D.; Flygare, S.D.; Bigham, A.W.; Lee, C.; Shaffer, T.; Wong, M.; Bhattacharjee, A.; Eichler, E.E.; Bamshad, M.; Nickerson, D.A.; Shendure, J. (2009). "Targeted capture and massively parallel sequencing of 12 human exomes". Nature. 461 (7261): 272–276. Bibcode:2009Natur.461..272N. doi:10.1038/nature08250. PMC 2844771. PMID 19684571.
- Ng, S.B.; Buckingham, K.J.; Lee, C.; Bigham, A.W.; Tabor, H.K.; Dent, K.M.; Huff, C.D.; Shannon, P.T.; Jabs, E.W.; Nickerson, D.A.; Shendure, J.; Bamshad, M.J. (2010). "Exome sequencing identifies the cause of a Mendelian disorder". Nature Genetics. 42 (1): 30–35. doi:10.1038/ng.499. PMC 2847889. PMID 19915526.
