= Adrienne Pao =

Native Hawaiian photographer

- Born: Adrienne Keahi Pao; Oakland, California, U.S.
- Education: San Jose State University (MFA)
- Occupation: Photographer

Adrienne Keahi Pao is a Native Hawaiian photographer. She is most known for her Dress Tent installations, which have been displayed at museums worldwide.

== Early life ==
Pao was born in Oakland, California. Her mother is French and English and her father is native Hawaiian.

Growing up, Pao went back to Hawai'i at least once a year with her father to visit family in Kailua. Much of her work draws off of her experiences as a multiracial Hawaiian. Her father gave her an old camera when she was fifteen or sixteen and fell in love with photography.

== Education ==
Pao received an MFA in photography from San Jose State University.

== Career ==
Her photography has been featured in many museums. From July 16 to August 28, 2009, Pao's photography was presented in the San Francisco Museum of Modern Art's exhibition, Pipeline: Art, Surfing, and the Ocean Environment. The exhibition included her color photography that were reminiscent of "travel posters" to critique the exoticization of the islands' environment and people. On October 30, 2014, Pao's photography was included in Hawai'i Contemporary's exhibition, Chain of Fire. In 2016, the Chain of Fire exhibit, including Pao's work, was featured in Tokyo's Mori Art Museum. Her work has also been exhibited at Wave Hill Glyndor Gallery in the Bronx, New York; the Balcony Gallery in Kailua, Hawai'i; the Museum of the African Diaspora in San Francisco; Recoleta Cultural Center in Buenos Aires, Argentina; and Caixa Cultural in Rio de Janeiro, Brazil.

Pao collaborated with Robin Lasser, another artist, on a series of installations and photographs titled Dress Tent. The Dress Tents are large-scale pieces of clothing installed on specific Hawaiian landscapes and worn by female subjects. The pieces serve as critiques on a variety of themes, including gender, immigration policy, and environmental degradation, among others.

Pao's most famous piece is within the Dress Tent series, titled Dashboard Hula Girl: In Search of Aunty Keahi. The piece consists of a tan colored raffia skirt, standing over ten feet tall and fourteen feet in diameter, that was meant to simultaneously embody a hula skirt and a traditional Hawaiian grass hut.

During the performance, women climbed out from the skirt and "transformed into a living, breathing, animated representation of the dashboard hula girl." The installation reflects Pao's own personal journey and experiences as a multiracial Hawaiian, serving as a way for her to "reclaim her gaze of home." In the second part of the exhibit, Pao emphasized ancestral connections via an immersive exhibition of visuals and sounds. It centers around a recording of the chant 'Eia o Ka Lani Ka Manomano ("Here is the Chief, the Great One") that Pao's father found in the Smithsonian archives. In 2017, Dashboard Hula Girl: In Search of Aunty Keahi was featured in the Smithsonian's Culture Lab exhibition "Ae Kai: A Culture Lab on Convergence."
