= Kamakahukilani =

- Born: Elizabeth Kamakahukilani Von Oelhoffen; 1937; Molokaʻi, Territory of Hawaii
- Died: 1999 (aged 62)

Kamakahukilani Von Oelhoffen (1937–November 1999) was a Native Hawaiian educator, poet, and activist known for her repeated assertion of the rights of indigenous cultural practice.

== Life ==
Born Elizabeth Kamakahukilani Von Oelhoffen in Pukoo, Molokai, she grew up in the housing projects of Palolo Valley. Her childhood friends included singer Kui Lee. Her mother was an activist, though she had to do this in hiding. During the Red Scare, her family hid haole socialists in their small home. Kamaka cited her schoolteacher, Gottfried Seitz, as some inspiration for her to become an activist herself.

Her genealogy came from an ancient navigational line; hence the name "Kamakahukilani" (eyes that pull the heavens). Throughout her life, Kamaka was fascinated by archaeo-astronomy, star lore, navigation, geometry and indigenous physics. She also studied Arabian astronomy, ancient architecture, and the works of historical figures such as Pythagoras. She was known for instructing her students at night with the use of her "kako'o", or walking-stick, to visually demonstrate the alignment of constellations, stars, and planets.

Kamakahukilani was featured in a 1983 National Geographic article on activism, which highlighted her struggles on the island of Hawai'i. She was a strong figure in the struggles for Halawa Valley and Mauna Kea, among others. Kamakahukilani was an early member of Mauna Kea Anaina Hou and her astronomy work was cited in the review of construction for the Thirty Meter Telescope.

At one time Kamakahukilani served as Sergeant-at-arms for Ka Lahui Hawai'i. However, she was always known for her "free agency" in working with all parts of the Hawaiian Sovereignty Movement. Kamakahukilani served as the vangard at the 1993 Onipa'a march which marked 100 years since the overthrow of the Hawaiian kingdom.

=== Personal life ===
Kamaka was at one time married to a former prisoner who died soon after they married. He gave her a copy of the book The Prophet by Khalil Gibran, which inspired her own writing. Because of her marriage, Kamaka's legal last name was Palakiko at the time of her death.

Kamakahukilani was a contemporary of and close friend to Kawaipuna Prejean. Both were students of the legendary Pilahi Paki. Kamaka, Kawaipuna, and their friend (songwriter) Liko Martin travelled extensively throughout the continental U.S. and beyond, sharing music and culture with other activists and indigenous peoples worldwide.

Kamakahukilani died of cancer at the age of 62 in November 1999.
