= S. Haunani Apoliona =

Hawaiian activist

S. Haunani Apoliona is a native Hawaiian politician, banker, musician, and activist for the Hawaiian sovereignty movement.

In 1997, Apoliona was sworn in to the Office of Hawaiian Affairs Board of Trustees and served as its chairperson from 2000 to 2010, as the longest serving board chairperson in OHA's thirty-four year history. She held many federal office positions, such as President's Advisory Commission on Asian American and Pacific Islanders, Queen Liliʻuokalani Children's Center Advisory Board, Queen Emma Foundation, The Nature Conservancy, Bank of Hawaiʻi Corporation, the Bernice Pauahi Bishop Museum Board and U.S. Bureau of the Census Race Ethnic Advisory Council (REAC). As a businesswoman, she was a trustee with the Bank of Hawaii starting in 2004.

Hawaii residents also know her as a musical entertainer and performer with the Hawaiian music group Olomana since 1982. She is a known guitarist and has won several Nā Hōkū Hanohano awards.
