= Kimo Armitage =

American poet and author

James Kimo Armitage is an American poet, children's book author, playwright and videographer from Haleʻiwa, Hawaii. He won the 2016 Maureen Egan Writers Exchange Award for Poetry, and is best known for his 2016 novel, The Healers. As of 2013, Armitage was an assistant professor at Kamakakuokalani Center for Hawaiian Studies at the University of Hawaii at Manoa.

Armitage was raised by his maternal grandparents in Haleʻiwa, Hawaii. He earned a doctorate in creative writing from the University of Hawaiʻi. He apprenticed with poet and novelist Albert Wendt.

== Books ==
- Armitage, Kimo (2016). The Healers. Honolulu: University of Hawaiʻi Press. ISBN 9780824856458.
