= List of people from Oakland, California =

This list includes people born in Oakland, California, or who lived in Oakland for a significant time.

== Academics ==
- George H. Hildebrand – industrial relations scholar at Cornell University
- Gail Mahood – geology (born in Oakland)
- Helen Sharsmith – botanist (born in Oakland)

== Artists and designers ==
- Natalia Anciso – artist and educator
- Steven F. Arnold – filmmaker, photographer, painter, illustrator, set and costume designer, and assemblage artist
- Olive Ayhens – painter
- Garry Knox Bennett – woodworker, metalworker, furniture maker, artist
- Bernice Bing – artist, activist
- Warrington Colescott – artist and educator
- Henry Doane – landscape painter, commercial artist
- Janet Doub Erickson – artist and author
- Roger C. Field – industrial designer, graduated from California College of the Arts
- Linda Geary – painter, teacher
- Liz Hernández – painter, sculptor, graphic designer
- Paul Hultberg – multidisciplinary artist, enamel muralist
- Mary Catherine Lamb, textile artist
- Oliver Lee Jackson – painter, printmaker, sculptor
- Walter J. Mathews – architect, designed the First Unitarian Church of Oakland
- Bernard Maybeck – architect
- Jeremy Mayer – sculptor
- Julia Morgan – architect, raised and buried in Oakland
- Willis O'Brien – animator
- Nathan Oliveira – painter, printmaker, sculptor, professor
- Oree Originol – graphic poster artist, activist
- Adrienne Keahi Pao – photographer, artist
- Lisa Quinn – artist, author, designer
- Mel Ramos – painter
- Favianna Rodriguez – painter, artist
- Galen Rowell – photographer
- J. Otto Seibold – artist, illustrator, author
- Elizabeth Sher – documentary and short filmmaker, artist
- Seasick Steve – blues musician
- Betty Swords – cartoonist
- Morrie Turner – artist, illustrator, author of the Wee Pals comic strip
- Wendy Yoshimura – artist

== Athletes ==
- James Akinjo – basketball player (Israeli Basketball Premier League)
- Ron Allen – professional skateboarder
- Zack Andrews – baseball player
- Peter Arnautoff – soccer player
- Pervis Atkins – NFL football player, Los Angeles Rams, Washington Redskins, Oakland Raiders, actor, The Longest Yard
- Don Barksdale – basketball player
- Drew Barry – basketball player
- Jon Barry – basketball player and sportscaster
- Charlie Beamon – Major League baseball pitcher
- Charlie Beamon Jr. – Major League baseball player
- Davion Berry (born 1991) – basketball player
- Davone Bess – NFL football player
- Will Blackwell – NFL football player
- Linc Blakely – Major League Baseball player, Cincinnati Reds
- Marlin Briscoe – NFL football player
- John Brodie – NFL football player and sportscaster
- Jabari Brown – basketball player
- Steve Brye – Major League baseball player, No. 1 pick of Twins, played nine years in majors
- Don Budge – tennis player
- Chris Burford – football player
- Glenn Burke – baseball player
- Calen Carr – soccer player and television host
- Tiffany Chin – figure skater
- Steve Clark – swimmer, won five Olympic gold medals
- Ray Crouse – football player
- Bruce Cunningham – Major League Baseball player, Boston Braves
- Jared Cunningham – basketball player
- Antonio Davis – NBA basketball player
- Steve DeBerg – football player
- Bernie DeViveiros – Major League Baseball player, Chicago White Sox, Detroit Tigers
- Taylor Douthit – Major League Baseball player, St. Louis Cardinals, Chicago Cubs, Cincinnati Reds
- Forey Duckett – football player
- Dennis Eckersley – baseball player
- Manny Fernandez – football player
- Eric Fernsten – NBA basketball player, NBA, CBA, and Europe
- Curt Flood – Major League Baseball player, Cincinnati Reds, St. Louis Cardinals, Washington Senators; known for challenging the reserve clause
- Greg Foster – basketball player
- La Vel Freeman – baseball player
- Len Gabrielson – Major League Baseball player, first baseman, Philadelphia Phillies
- Len Gabrielson – Major League Baseball player, outfielder, Milwaukee Braves, Chicago Cubs, San Francisco Giants, California Angels, Los Angeles Dodgers
- Joe Gaines – Major League Baseball player, Cincinnati Reds, Baltimore Orioles, Houston Astros
- Derrick Gardner – football player
- Kiwi Gardner – basketball player
- Brad Gilbert – tennis player and coach
- John Gillespie – Major League Baseball player, Cincinnati Reds
- Jesse Gonder – baseball player
- Drew Gooden – NBA basketball player
- Alexis Gray-Lawson – basketball player, Phoenix Mercury
- Bob Greenwood – Major League Baseball player, Philadelphia Phillies
- Bud Hafey – Major League Baseball player, Chicago White Sox, Pittsburgh Pirates, Cincinnati Reds, Philadelphia Phillies
- Tom Hafey – Major League Baseball player, New York Giants, St. Louis Browns
- Roger Harding – football player
- Rickey Henderson – baseball player
- Jan Henne – swimmer, two-time gold medalist at 1968 Summer Olympics
- Steve Hosey – baseball player
- Al Hrabosky – baseball pitcher and sportscaster
- Proverb Jacobs – NFL football player, Philadelphia Eagles, New York Giants
- Jackie Jensen – baseball player
- Brian Johnson – baseball player
- Josh Johnson – quarterback for the Cincinnati Bengals
- Maurice Jones-Drew – football player
- Robert Jordan – football player
- Bobby Kemp – football player
- Jason Kidd – NBA basketball player and coach
- MacArthur Lane – football player
- Cookie Lavagetto – baseball player and manager
- James Yimm Lee – martial arts teacher
- Tony Lema – golfer
- Bill Lester – NASCAR driver
- Alysa Liu – figure skater, two-time gold medalist at 2026 Winter Olympics
- Damian Lillard – NBA basketball player
- Don Lofgran – NBA professional basketball player
- Ernie Lombardi – baseball player
- Terrell Lowery – baseball player
- Lorenzo Lynch – football player
- Marshawn Lynch – football player
- Eddie McGah – baseball player, part-owner of Oakland Raiders
- Bill McKalip – college All-American football player, NFL player, Portsmouth Spartans / Detroit Lions
- Joe Mellana – Major League Baseball player, Philadelphia Athletics
- Demetrius "Hook" Mitchell – streetball player
- Joe Morgan – baseball second baseman and sportscaster
- Kirk Morrison – football player
- Hank Norberg – football player
- Mike Norris – baseball player
- Lee Norwood – ice hockey player
- Cameron Oliver – basketball power forward/center in the Israeli Basketball Premier League
- Zoe Ann Olsen – Olympic diver
- Gary Payton – basketball player, born and raised in Oakland
- Gary Pettis – baseball player and coach
- Paul Pierce – basketball player
- Vada Pinson – baseball player and coach
- Jim Pollard – basketball player
- Leon Powe – basketball player
- Damon Powell – basketball player
- Jarrod Pughsley – football player
- John Ralston – football player and coach
- Isiah Rider – basketball player
- Chris Roberson – baseball player
- Cliff Robinson – basketball player, youngest (teenaged), highest scoring NBA Player, 1976 TOC Champions
- Frank Robinson – baseball player and manager
- Jimmy Rollins – baseball player
- Bill Russell – basketball player and coach
- Brian Shaw – basketball player and coach
- Paul Silas – basketball player and coach
- Fred Silva – football official
- Marvel Smith – football player
- Dave Stewart – Major League baseball player and executive
- John Sutro – football player
- Ron Theobald – Major League baseball player
- Jim Tobin – Major League baseball player
- Marviel Underwood – football player
- Kwame Vaughn (born 1990) – basketball player
- Langston Walker – football player
- Andre Ward – professional boxer
- George Wells – professional wrestler

== Businesspeople, entrepreneurs and industrialists ==
- Stephen Bechtel – engineer, president, CEO of Bechtel Corporation, 1933–1960
- Anthony Chabot – entrepreneur, father of hydraulic mining, namesake of Chabot Space & Science Center, Lake Chabot, and Chabot College, buried in Oakland
- Charles Crocker – railroad tycoon, buried in Oakland
- Debbi Fields – entrepreneur, founder of Mrs. Fields cookies
- Domingo Ghirardelli – founder of the Ghirardelli Chocolate Company based in San Francisco, buried in Oakland
- Ken Hofmann – former owner of the Oakland Athletics
- Henry J. Kaiser – entrepreneur, businessman, founder of Kaiser Permanente and Kaiser Family Foundation, buried in Oakland
- Gladys H. Lent-Barndollar – businesswoman and clubwoman; president, National Federation of Business and Professional Women's Clubs
- Mark Mastrov – founder of 24 Hour Fitness, partial owner of the Sacramento Kings
- Jonah Peretti – founder of BuzzFeed
- Francis Marion Smith (also known as "Borax" Smith) – miner, business magnate
- Tanya Van Court, founder and CEO of Goalsetter

== Chefs ==
- Nelson German – chef
- Tanya Holland – chef, restaurateur, podcast host, and cookbook author
- Nite Yun – chef and restaurateur

== Entertainment ==
- Mahershala Ali – Academy Award-winning actor
- Eddie Anderson – actor
- Max Baer Jr. – actor, film director
- Matt Bettinelli-Olpin – filmmaker and musician
- Pamela Blake – actress
- True Boardman – silent film actor
- Alex Bretow – film producer, director, and screenwriter
- David Carradine – actor
- Rafael Casal – actor, writer
- Connie Cezon – actress
- Angus Cloud – actor
- Keyshia Cole – musician
- Tracie Collins – actress, writer, theatre director and producer
- Ryan Coogler – director
- Buster Crabbe – actor
- T. D. Crittenden – silent film actor
- Robert Culp – actor
- Mark Curry – actor/comedian
- Gloria Dea – actress, dancer and magician
- Walter DeLeon – screenwriter
- Dimitri Diatchenko – actor
- Daveed Diggs – actor and rapper
- Rockmond Dunbar – actor, mixed-media artist
- Sheila E. – musician
- Michael Earl – puppeteer
- Clint Eastwood – actor, Academy Award-winning film producer, and director
- Lyndsy Fonseca – actress
- Kirk Francis – sound engineer
- Squire Fridell – actor
- Cary Fukunaga – Emmy Award-winning director
- Sylvia Gerrish – performer of musical comedy and light opera
- Sumner Getchell – actor
- Gary Goldman – filmmaker
- Michael A. Goorjian – actor and filmmaker
- R. Henry Grey – silent film actor
- Khamani Griffin – child actor
- Mark Hamill – actor
- Bernie Hamilton – actor, Starsky and Hutch
- MC Hammer – rapper
- Tom Hanks – Academy Award-winning actor, raised in Oakland
- Susan Seaforth Hayes – actor
- Claude Heater – opera singer and actor, Ben-Hur
- Russell Hornsby – actor
- Warner Jones – actor
- Moshe Kasher – comedian, actor, and author/writer; raised in Oakland
- Elmer Keeton – musician, chorus director
- Kehlani – singer
- Joe Knowland – newspaper publisher, actor
- David Labrava – actor, writer, tattoo artist
- Remy Lacroix – adult actress
- Ted Lange – actor
- Brandon Lee (son of Bruce Lee) – actor, born in Oakland
- Bruce Lee – actor, martial artist
- Nnegest Likké – film director
- Caryl Lincoln – actress
- Delroy Lindo – actor
- Dakin Matthews – actor
- Russ Meyer – film director
- Jefferson Moffitt – screenwriter, film director
- Paul Mooney – comedian
- Shemar Moore – actor, model
- Mitch Mullany – actor
- Kali Muscle – actor
- Roger Nichols – recording engineer
- Natalie Nunn – television personality
- Laura Oakley – silent film actress
- Orunamamu (Marybeth Washington-Stofle) – storyteller
- Frank Oz – actor, director, puppeteer for Bert, Cookie Monster and Grover on Sesame Street
- Chelsea Peretti – comedian, actress
- Dorothy Revier – silent film actress, dancer
- Cherie Roberts – adult model, photographer
- Cynthia Robinson – musician
- Raphael Saadiq – singer, songwriter, multi-instrumentalist, and record producer
- Timothy B. Schmit – singer, bassist of The Eagles, born in Oakland
- Kellita Smith – actress and model
- Jack Soo (Goro Suzuki) – comedian, actor, Barney Miller
- George Stevens – Academy Award-winning film director
- Cynthia Stevenson – actress, born in Oakland
- Ethel Grey Terry – silent film actress
- Colin Trevorrow – film director
- Jo Van Fleet – actress
- Matt Vasgersian – actor, sports broadcaster
- Mills Watson – actor
- Robert Webber – film and TV actor, 12 Angry Men
- Will Wright – game designer
- Daniel Wu – actor
- Bassem Youssef – satirist
- Zendaya – Emmy Award-winning actress

== Leaders, activists, and politicians ==
- Richard Aoki – activist
- William P. Baker – politician
- Sonny Barger – founder of the Hells Angels motorcycle club
- Henry G. Blasdel – first governor of Nevada; resident of Oakland
- Annie Florence Brown – president, Oakland Board of Education
- Jerry Brown – politician, former governor of California and mayor of Oakland
- Albert E. Carter – politician
- Frank Chu – eccentric street protester
- Eloise B. Cushing – lawyer; librarian of the Alameda County Law Library (47 years)
- C. L. Dellums – organizer and leader of the Brotherhood of Sleeping Car Porters
- Ron Dellums – politician, former U.S. congressman and representative, mayor of Oakland
- Frank M. Dixon – politician, former governor of Alabama
- Warren B. English – Confederate war veteran, politician, realtor
- Lydia Flood Jackson – businesswoman, club woman, suffragist, an oldest living native of Oakland when she died in 1963
- Marcus Foster – educator, first African-American Superintendent of the Oakland Unified School District
- Alicia Garza – co-founder of Black Lives Matter
- Elihu Harris – politician, former mayor of Oakland
- JuJu Harris – food-affordability activist
- Kamala Harris – politician, former U.S. senator (2017–2021), former attorney general of California (2011–2017) and former vice president of the United States (2021–2025); born at Kaiser hospital in Oakland but lived and attended school in Berkeley
- Van Jones – founder, Ella Baker Center for Human Rights and special advisor for Green Jobs under U.S. President Barack Obama
- Joseph R. Knowland – former U.S. representative and former owner of the Oakland Tribune, cremated in Oakland
- William F. Knowland – former U.S. senator
- Fred Korematsu – Japanese-American who fought forced internment, testing the law in Korematsu v. United States
- Barbara Lee – incumbent mayor and former U.S. representative
- Charles Goodall Lee – dentist, civic leader, benefactor of the Chinese American Citizens Alliance
- Clara Elizabeth Chan Lee – activist, first Chinese-American woman voter in the U.S.
- Richard Lee – horticulturist, activist for the legalization of marijuana
- Rue Mapp – outdoor enthusiast and environmentalist
- Edwin Meese III – former U.S. Attorney General
- Victor H. Metcalf – politician, attorney, banker
- Jessica Mitford – writer, activist, former communist
- Paul Montauk – Communist politician and two-time candidate for Oakland mayor
- Ethel Moore – civic, education, and national defense work leader
- Anca Mosoiu – technology activist
- Nancy Nadel – member of the Oakland City Council
- Huey P. Newton – activist, co-founder of the Black Panther Party
- Andrew Nisbet Jr. – member of the Washington House of Representatives and United States Army officer
- Washington J. Oglesby – one of the earliest Black lawyers in Alameda County
- Pat Parker – Black lesbian poet and activist
- Ed Rosenthal – horticulturist, publisher, activist for the legalization of marijuana
- Byron Rumford – pharmacist
- John A. Russo – Oakland city attorney, former city councilman
- Bobby Seale – activist, co-founder of the Black Panther Party
- Nicole Shanahan – attorney and running mate of Robert F. Kennedy Jr.'s 2024 presidential campaign
- Hettie B. Tilghman – African-American activist and suffragist
- Robert Treuhaft – activist for labor and leftist causes, attorney, writer
- Earl Warren – assistant attorney of City of Oakland, district attorney of Alameda County, attorney general of California, governor of California, U.S. Supreme Court chief justice
- Charles Stetson Wheeler – attorney, regent of the University of California
- Lionel J. Wilson – politician, first African-American mayor of Oakland
- Mother Wright – anti-hunger activist

== Military ==
- Bud Anderson – USAF (served 1942–1972) fighter pilot and commander, triple ace who retired at the rank of colonel
- Jeremiah C. Sullivan – Civil War general in the Union Army and staff member of Ulysses S. Grant, buried in Oakland

== Musicians, composers and dancers ==
- 3XKrazy – male rap group
- A-Plus – rapper
- Rustee Allen – musician
- Ambrose Akinmusire – musician, trumpeter, composer
- Billie Joe Armstrong – co-founder of Green Day
- Tim Armstrong – musician, lead vocalist of punk rock band Rancid
- Paul Baloff (d. 2002) – former lead singer of thrash metal band Exodus
- Ant Banks – rapper, producer
- Gaylord Birch – musician
- Carla Bley – composer, musician
- Boots Riley – rapper, filmmaker
- Mike Botts – studio musician, drummer for rock band Bread
- Bobby Brackins – rapper, songwriter
- Ian Brennan – Grammy Award-winning record producer and author
- Antonia Brico (born Wilhelmina Wolthius) – classical pianist, first female conductor of New York Philharmonic
- Chris Broderick – musician, lead guitarist for the heavy metal band Megadeth
- Peter Buck – musician, guitarist and co-founder of the alternative rock band R.E.M.
- Aaron Burckhard – musician, first drummer of the grunge band Nirvana
- Kevin Cadogan – musician, original lead guitarist of Third Eye Blind
- Emilio Castillo – musician, a founding member of Tower of Power
- Casual – rapper
- Mike Clark – musician
- Cold Blood – rock, soul, jazz band
- Keyshia Cole – Grammy Award-nominated R&B singer-songwriter, record producer, born and raised in Oakland
- The Coup – hip hop group
- Jason Cropper – original band member of Weezer
- Del tha Funkee Homosapien – musician
- Daveed Diggs – rapper and actor
- Digital Underground – rap group
- Mike Dirnt – co-founder of Green Day
- Sue Draheim – fiddler
- Mac Dre – rapper, born in Oakland, raised in Vallejo
- Dru Down – rapper
- Isadora Duncan – dancer
- E-A-Ski – rapper, record producer
- En Vogue – Grammy Award-nominated R&B singing group, originated from Oakland in 1990
- Coke Escovedo – musician
- Pete Escovedo – musician, born in Oakland
- Peter Michael Escovedo – musician
- Robb Flynn – musician best known as rhythm guitarist and vocalist for Machine Head
- Michael Franti – musician
- Fred Frith – improvisational musician, guitarist, composer, professor of music
- Nils Frykdahl – musician, a founding member of Sleepytime Gorilla Museum and Idiot Flesh
- G-Eazy – rapper and producer
- David Garibaldi – musician, member of Tower of Power
- GGFH – industrial band
- Mic Gillette – musician, a founding member of Tower of Power
- Goapele – soul and R&B singer
- Larry Graham – musician
- Robert Greenberg – composer, pianist, teacher, and writer
- Guapdad 4000 – rapper, musician
- MC Hammer – musician, born in Oakland
- Jeff Hanneman – former guitarist for heavy metal band Slayer
- Shawn Harris – musician; former member of The Matches
- Davey Havok – musician, lead singer for AFI
- Edwin and Walter Hawkins – gospel singers
- Hieroglyphics – rap group, originated from Oakland
- Earl Hines – jazz pianist
- John Lee Hooker – blues singer
- Paul Jackson – musician
- Henry Kaiser – musician, grandson of Henry J. Kaiser
- Keak da Sneak – musician
- Kehlani – singer
- Kid 606 – musician
- Sharon Knight – Celtic musician, founding member of pagan rock band Pandemonaeon
- Kreayshawn – rapper
- Stephen "Doc" Kupka – musician, founding member of Tower of Power
- Thomas Lauderdale – musician and pianist
- LaToya London – singer; born in San Francisco, raised in Oakland
- Leviticus Lyon – tenor vocalist; born in San Francisco, raised in Oakland
- Pep Love – rapper
- The Lovemakers – pop band
- The Luniz – Grammy Award-nominated rap duo
- Michael Manring – bassist, born in D.C., lives in Oakland
- Adrian Marcel – singer
- Jim Martin – musician
- Tony Martin – singer, actor
- MC Lars – rapper; post-punk laptop rap
- Dave Meniketti – rock musician; born and raised in Oakland; lead singer/lead guitarist for Y&T
- Seagram Miller – rapper
- Mistah F.A.B. – rapper
- Luke Mombrea – composer
- David Murray – musician
- mxmtoon – singer/songwriter
- Fantastic Negrito – musician
- Noaccordion – multimedia project of Onah Indigo
- Numskull – rapper
- Ray Obiedo – musician
- Marty Paich – pianist, composer, arranger, producer, director, conductor
- Harry Partch – composer
- The Phenomenauts – science and space band, refer to Oakland as "Earth's capital"
- Phesto – rapper, producer
- Matt Pike – guitarist of Sleep and High on Fire
- The Pointer Sisters – Grammy Award-winning R&B singing group
- Pooh-Man – rapper
- PopLyfe – pop group
- Francis Rocco Prestia – musician
- San Quinn – rapper, born in Oakland, raised in San Francisco
- Perri "Pebbles" Reid – singer-songwriter, manager of TLC
- Richie Rich – rapper
- Cynthia Robinson – musician
- Raphael Saadiq – musician
- Arion Salazar – musician in Third Eye Blind
- Pharoah Sanders – musician
- Timothy B. Schmit – rock musician, bassist for the Eagles
- E.C. Scott – blues singer, songwriter and record producer; television host
- Tupac Shakur – rapper, lived in Oakland
- Shock G – rapper
- Sharon Shore – ballet dancer, model
- Calvin E. Simmons – symphony orchestra conductor, namesake of Calvin Simmons Theatre, born in San Francisco
- Souls of Mischief – rap group
- J. Stalin – rapper, co-founder of Livewire Records
- Steady Mobb'n – rap duo
- Jamie Stewart – frontman of the experimental group Xiu Xiu
- Shakir Stewart – record producer, senior vice president of Island Def Jam Music Group
- Freddie Stone – musician
- Rose Stone – musician
- Sly Stone – musician
- Bill Summers – musician
- The Team – rap group
- Tony! Toni! Toné! – R&B singing group
- Too Short – rapper, born in Los Angeles, lived in Oakland 1980–1994
- Tower of Power – band, formed and based in Oakland
- Tune-Yards – band; indie, afro-funk
- Weasel Walter – progressive rock and free jazz musician/composer
- Freddie Washington – musician
- Lenny Williams – musician, early member of Tower of Power
- Y&T – rock band, formed in Oakland 1974
- Yukmouth – rapper
- Baba Zumbi – co-founder of hip hop group Zion I

== Physicians ==
- Michelle McMurry-Heath – medical doctor and immunologist
- Samuel Merritt – physician, practiced in San Francisco, namesake of Merritt College, Merritt Hospital, and Lake Merritt, buried in Oakland
- Virginia Prentiss – nanny to Jack London, midwife and former slave

== Religious leaders ==
- David A. Bednar – LDS apostle, born in Oakland
- David Berg – controversial cult leader, founder of Children of God
- Yusuf Bey – controversial Black Muslim activist
- Mose Durst – author, educator, former president of the Unification Church
- James Ishmael Ford – Zen Buddhist priest and Unitarian Universalist minister
- Ray Frank – Jewish leader
- Jack Hayford – minister, chancellor, songwriter
- Judah Leon Magnes – prominent Reform rabbi, first president of the Hebrew University of Jerusalem
- Carol Anne O'Marie – Roman Catholic nun, mystery fiction writer
- Bebe Patten – evangelist and founder of Patten University
- Clarence Richard Silva – Catholic bishop from Oakland, current bishop of Honolulu
- Richard B. Stamps – anthropologist, archeologist, president of the Taipei Mission of the Church of Jesus Christ of Latter Day Saints
- Allen Henry Vigneron – Catholic bishop, leader of the Roman Catholic Diocese of Oakland

== Scientists and inventors ==
- Dean Burk – medical researcher
- Fernando J. Corbató – computer scientist
- Frederick Cottrell – inventor
- Frank Epperson – popsicle inventor
- Lloyd N. Ferguson – first African American to earn a Ph.D. in chemistry at the University of California, Berkeley
- Heinz Fraenkel-Conrat – biochemist and virologist; died in Oakland
- Ansel Franklin Hall – first park naturalist for Yosemite National Park, first Chief Forester for the National Park Service
- Dennis Robert Hoagland, 1884–1949, botanist
- Richard F. Johnston – ornithologist, academic and author
- Stanley Miller – chemist
- Sten Odenwald – astronomer and author
- Wendell Phillips – archaeologist and oil magnate
- William Shurtleff – researcher, technical writer, bibliographer, historian, and popularizer of soy foods
- Lydia Weld – first woman to get a degree in engineering from Massachusetts Institute of Technology and naval architect in World War II

== Writers and poets ==
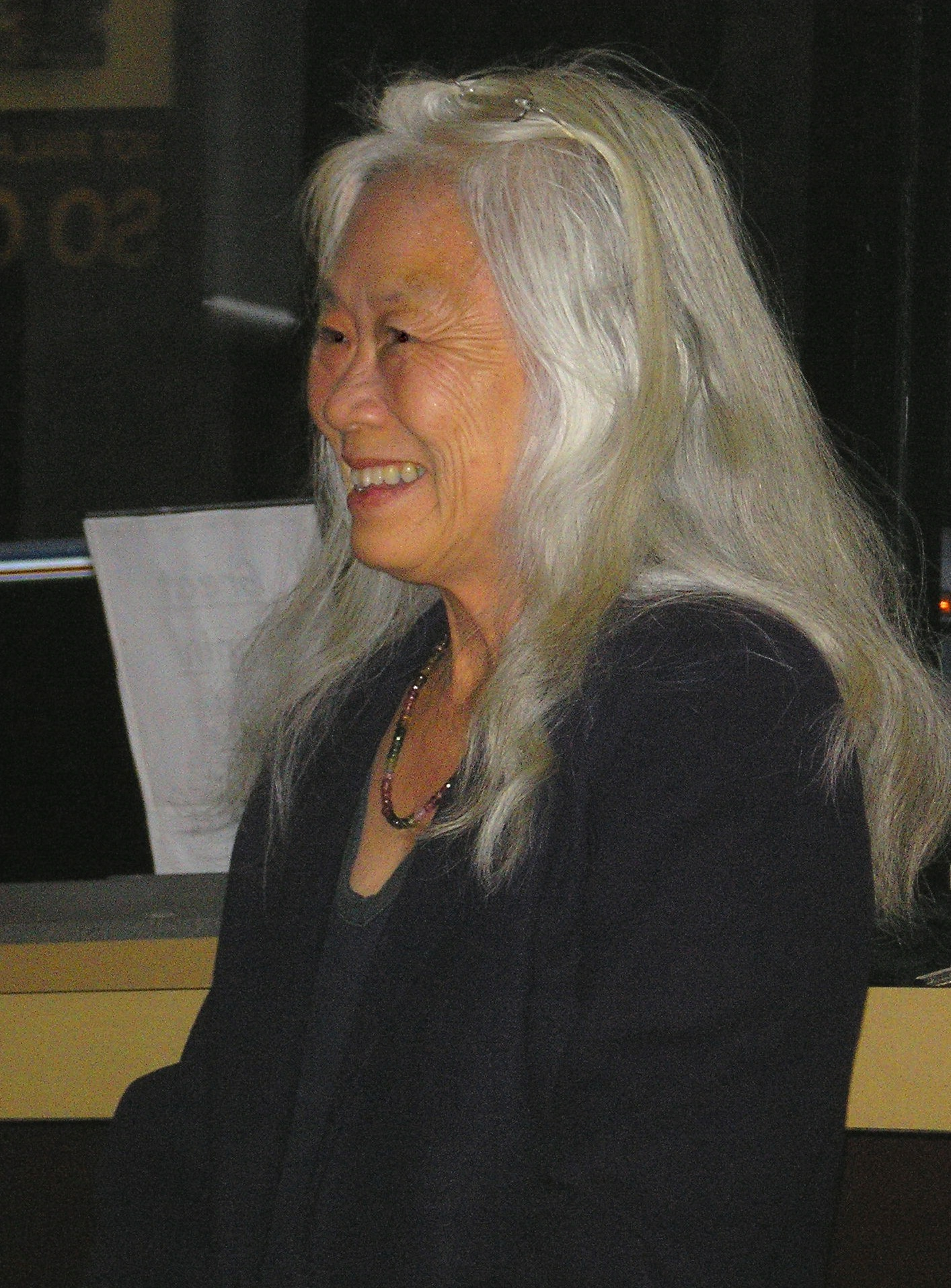
Author Maxine Hong Kingston

- Daniel Alarcón – writer, currently resides in Oakland
- Catherine Asaro – writer
- David Bach – financial writer author
- Chauncey Bailey – journalist assassinated by an agent of Your Black Muslim Bakery
- Delilah L. Beasley – first African-American columnist to be published in a major newspaper
- Anthony Boucher – writer
- Garrett Caples – poet, writer
- Jon Carroll – columnist for the San Francisco Chronicle
- Frank Chin – writer
- Daniel Clowes – comic book writer, Academy Award-nominated screenwriter, currently resides in Oakland
- Robert Duncan – poet
- Sarah Webster Fabio – African-American writer, poet, educator; born in Nashville, lived in Oakland 1955–1979
- Ben Fong-Torres – rock journalist
- Maxine Hong Kingston – writer, currently resides in Oakland
- Richard Lange – Los Angeles-based author, born in Oakland
- Yiyun Li – writer, former creative writing instructor at Mills College
- Jack London – writer, raised in Oakland, namesake of Jack London Square
- Anthony Marra – writer
- Rod McKuen – poet, composer, singer
- Joaquin Miller – poet, lived in Oakland 1886–1913
- Jessica Mitford – author
- Leila Mottley – author and poet
- Jess Mowry – writer
- Colleen Patrick-Goudreau – author, speaker, and podcaster
- Ishmael Reed – writer, currently resides in Oakland
- Mary Roach – science writer, currently resides in Oakland
- William Saroyan – dramatist, author, lived in Oakland 1913–1918
- Jason Shiga – author, cartoonist, puzzle designer
- Alex Steffen – writer, born in Oakland
- Gertrude Stein – writer
- Robert Louis Stevenson – writer
- Tina Susman – journalist, Time senior editor, former national editor of BuzzFeed News
- Amy Tan – writer, born in Oakland
- Jack Vance – science fiction writer
- Nellie Wong – poet and activist, born in Oakland
- Shawn Wong – writer, English professor
- Helen Zia – writer, journalist, and activist, currently resides in Oakland

== Criminals ==
- Eugene Barrett – serial killer of three women in Honolulu, Hawaii
- Felix Mitchell – notorious drug lord and gang leader of the 1970s and early 1980s
- Hans Reiser – computer programmer, owner of Namesys, convicted of murdering his wife
- Tommy Lynn Sells – murderer and suspected serial killer

== See also ==
- List of people from San Francisco
- List of people from Palo Alto
- List of people from San Jose, California
- List of people from Santa Cruz, California
- List of people from Berkeley, California
- List of mayors of Oakland, California
