= List of people from Berkeley, California =

Belva Davis, Joirnalist and News Media Berkeley Resident

This is a list of notable people that were born in, or who have lived in, Berkeley, California. Located in the San Francisco Bay area and near Oakland, it includes people who attended Berkeley High School, but not people that attended University of California, Berkeley unless they achieved notoriety while in attendance, and were also residents of the city at the time.

== Academia ==
- Wasiullah Khan – founder of East-West University
- Margaret Singer – clinical psychologist, professor at UC Berkeley
- Alfred Tarski – mathematician, logician, professor at UC Berkeley
- Chang-Lin Tien – 8th chancellor of University of California, Berkeley (1990–1997), first Asian American and Chinese American to head a major United States university
- Blake R. Van Leer – US Army officer, civil rights advocate, and president of Georgia Institute of Technology
- Sean Williams – professor of ethnomusicology

== Actors ==
- Ben Affleck – actor, Academy Award-winning screenwriter and director; born in Berkeley
- Melissa Sue Anderson – actress
- Robert Culp – actor, screenwriter, voice actor, and director; attended Berkeley High School
- Augusta Dabney – actress; born and raised in Berkeley
- Daveed Diggs – actor, screenwriter, film producer, rapper, singer, songwriter; attended Berkeley High School
- Stanley Farrar – actor; born and raised in Berkeley; attended UC Berkeley
- Chloe Fineman – actress, Saturday Night Live comedian
- Whoopi Goldberg – Academy Award-winning actress and television personality; lived in Berkeley for many years
- Karen Grassle – actress
- Nina Hartley – pornographic actress
- Rita Moreno – actress, dancer; Oscar, Emmy and Tony Award winner
- Jamieson Price – voice actor
- Nicole Richie – socialite, reality television personality, fashion designer
- Rebecca Romijn – model, actress
- Andy Samberg – actor, Saturday Night Live comedian, member of Lonely Island, attended Berkeley High School
- Jorma Taccone – actor and director, member of Lonely Island, attended Berkeley High School
- Chris Tashima – actor and filmmaker
- Sasha Velour – drag queen
- Wavy Gravy – professional clown, actor, activist, Hog Farm founder
- Daniel Wu – Hong Kong actor

== Chefs, cookbook authors ==
- Andy Baraghani – chef, cookbook author, recipe developer and former food editor
- Paul Bertolli – chef, cookbook writer, food entrepreneur
- Narsai David – chef, author, radio and television personality
- Ken Hom – chef, author and television-show presenter
- Mollie Katzen – cookbook author
- Jack LaLanne – health and fitness enthusiast
- Samin Nosrat – chef, food writer, Netflix series host
- Alice Waters – restaurateur, chef, and activist, originally from Chatham Borough, New Jersey

== Crime ==
- Patty Hearst – newspaper heiress and kidnap victim
- Daniel Andreas San Diego – domestic terrorist

== Visual artists and designers ==
- Mai Kitazawa Arbegast – landscape architect
- Elmer Bischoff – painter
- Justina Blakeney – designer and author
- Helen Breger – printmaker, draftsperson, sculptor, watercolorist, and professor
- Christopher Brown – painter, printmaker, and professor
- Alan Chin – artist
- Daniel Clowes – cartoonist
- Robert Crumb – cartoonist
- Jay DeFeo – painter
- Richard Diebenkorn – painter
- Lillian Elliott – fiber artist, textile designer
- David Lance Goines – artist, calligrapher, typographer, printer, author
- Sidney Gordin – painter, sculptor, professor
- Adelaide Hanscom Leeson - photographer
- Michael Heizer – earth artist, sculptor
- Hans Hofmann – painter, teacher
- Joseph Holmes – landscape photographer
- Ynez Johnston – painter, sculptor, printmaker; born in Berkeley
- William Keith – landscape artist
- Peter Rutledge Koch – letterpress printer, artists book publisher, typographer, designer
- Ronnie Landfield – painter
- Dorothea Lange – photographer
- Sylvia Lark – Seneca painter, printmaker
- Roger Montgomery – urban designer, architect, Dean University of California, Berkeley
- Peter Reginato – sculptor
- Zahara Schatz – sculptor, artist
- Nancy Selvin – sculptor
- Jeremy Shafer – origami artist
- Izzy Sher – sculptor
- Adrian Tomine – cartoonist
- Ella Wall Van Leer – artist, architect and women's rights activist
- Peter Voulkos – ceramist, sculptor

== Business leaders and entrepreneurs ==
- Eric Allman – computer programmer, author of sendmail, co-founded the company Sendmail, Inc.
- John Buckman – internet entrepreneur
- Stephen G. Cecchetti – economist and economic advisor
- Philo T. Farnsworth – all-electronic television inventor, founder of Farnsworth Television and Radio Corporation
- John Gage – one of the founders of Sun Microsystems
- Candido Jacuzzi – inventor of submersible pump
- Bill Joy – developer of BSD UNIX and co-founder of Sun Microsystems
- Gordon Moore – co-founder of Intel
- Robert Reffkin – CEO of Compass, Inc.
- Eric Schmidt – ex-CEO of Google
- Dave Winer – software developer and entrepreneur
- Steve Wozniak – engineer and entrepreneur, Apple Inc. co-founder

== Filmmakers ==
- Craig Barron – filmmaker and visual effects supervisor
- Harrod Blank – documentary filmmaker and son of Les Blank
- Les Blank – documentary filmmaker
- Aaron Cometbus – documentarian of the punk rock music world
- Gregory Hoblit – film and television director
- Scott Hamilton Kennedy – Oscar nominated documentary filmmaker
- Lisa Onodera – film producer, Picture Bride, The Debut, Americanese
- Michael Ritchie – film director
- Akiva Schaffer – film director
- Phil Tippett – Academy Award-winning special effects artist
- Jay Ward – creator of animated television series Crusader Rabbit, Rocky and Bullwinkle, and George of the Jungle
- Saul Zaentz – film and music producer

== Journalists, news media ==
- Lowell Bergman – television journalist, former producer of 60 Minutes
- Belva Davis - TV Anchor and Reporter, NBC and KQED
- Ralph J. Gleason – music critic and columnist, founding editor of Rolling Stone magazine
- Rosalie Ritz – courtroom artist, reporter
- Galen Rowell – wilderness photographer, adventure photojournalist
- Tabitha Soren – MTV News reporter
- Charlie Winton – publisher

== Musicians ==
- John Coolidge Adams – composer and conductor of classical music and opera
- Samuel Adams – composer of contemporary classical, electronic, electroacoustic
- Billie Joe Armstrong – singer-songwriter, actor, guitarist, and lead singer of the Berkeley-based punk rock band Green Day
- Tim Armstrong – member of punk rock bands Rancid, Transplants and Operation Ivy
- Phyllida Ashley – pianist
- Emit Bloch – songwriter, guitarist, journalist
- Peter Buck – guitarist for R.E.M.
- Emilio Castillo – musician
- John Cipollina – guitarist, Quicksilver Messenger Service
- Tre Cool – drummer of the band Green Day
- Martha Davis – rock and new wave singer-songwriter
- Mike Dirnt – bassist of Green Day
- Rockmond Dunbar – actor
- Adam Duritz – singer-songwriter, Counting Crows
- John Fahey – guitarist
- John Fogerty – musician of Creedence Clearwater Revival
- Tom Fogerty – musician of Creedence Clearwater Revival
- Gabriela Lena Frank – Grammy-winning composer, Grammy-nominated pianist
- Rodney Franklin – jazz pianist
- Matt Freeman – member of punk rock bands Rancid and Operation Ivy
- Benny Green – jazz pianist
- Davey Havok – singer for AFI
- Charlie Hunter – jazz musician
- David Immerglück – guitarist, Counting Crows
- KSHMR – EDM producer and DJ
- Stephen "Doc" Kupka – musician
- Phil Lesh – Grateful Dead bassist
- Lil B, born Brandon McCartney, also known as the BasedGod – rapper, record producer, author, activist and motivational speaker
- Larry Livermore – writer, musician, founder of Lookout Records
- Ed Masuga – singer, musician, and songwriter
- Dylan Mattingly – composer
- Country Joe McDonald – singer-songwriter, and activist
- Dave Mello – drummer for ska punk band Operation Ivy
- Jesse Michaels – ska punk singer-songwriter for Operation Ivy and Common Rider
- Nick 13 – vocalist, guitarist
- Joaquín Nin-Culmell – composer, concert pianist, UC professor (emeritis), brother of Anaïs Nin
- The Pack – rap group
- Gwydion Pendderwen – born Thomas deLong, Wiccan folk singer
- Lenny Pickett – Saturday Night Live band leader, saxophone player
- Joshua Redman – jazz saxophonist
- Malvina Reynolds – singer, songwriter
- Hope Sandoval – musician and lead singer of Mazzy Star
- Joe Satriani – heavy metal/hard rock guitarist and teacher
- Akiva Schaffer – comedy writer, film director, and singer/songwriter of The Lonely Island, attended Berkeley High School
- Charles Seeger – musician, UC musicologist, pacifist, and father of folk singer Pete Seeger
- Tessa Seymour – cellist
- Charles Shere – composer
- Alex Skolnick – jazz and metal guitarist, writer
- Asa Taccone – founder and lead singer of band Electric Guest
- Grace Vamos – composer
- Kyle Vincent – singer, songwriter, author

== Politicians, activists, political figures and civil servants ==
- Jerry Brown – former mayor of Oakland and governor of California 2011–2019; previously served 1975–1983
- Eldridge Cleaver – political activist, an early leader of the Black Panther Party
- Rosebud Denovo – People's Park activist, killed by police
- Ann Fagan Ginger – human rights advocate
- Kamala Harris – vice president of the US
- David Horowitz – 1960s radical turned conservative activist
- Wayne Hsiung – animal rights activist and co-founder of Direct Action Everywhere
- Andrew Martinez – social activist
- Gus Newport – mayor
- Mariko Peters – Dutch politician and lawyer
- Robert Reich – politician, political commentator, academic, and writer
- Friend Richardson – governor of California, 1923–1926
- Fred Ross, Jr. – labor organizer, 1947–2022
- Jerry Rubin – social activist, Yippie
- Mario Savio – 1960s Free Speech Movement icon
- Bobby Seale – co-founder of the Black Panther Party
- Cindy Sheehan – anti-war activist
- Betty Reid Soskin - civil rights songwriter, music store owner, National Park Service ranger
- Ella Lillian Wall Van Leer – artist and architect, women's rights activist
- August Vollmer – police chief, "the father of modern policing"
- O. W. Wilson – Berkeley police officer, nationally recognized authority on policing
- Roy S. Wilson — Community and youth advocate who integrated Louisiana State University School of Law in 1950 List of people from Berkeley, California

A Pictorial History of the Negro in America, Langston Hughes and Milton Meltzer (1956) 3rd ed. revised by C. Eric Lincoln and Milton Meltzer (1968) 4th revised ed., A Pictorial History of Black Americans, by Langston Hughes, Milton Meltzer, and Abraham Lincoln (Crown, 1973)

- Clement C. Young – Progressive governor of California, 1927–1931

== Scientists, researchers ==
- Bruce Bolt – seismologist
- David Brower – environmentalist; founder of environmental organizations, including Friends of the Earth (1969) and Earth Island Institute (1982)
- Owen Chamberlain – particle physicist, UC Berkeley
- Hans Albert Einstein – UC professor of hydraulic engineering (1947-73), son of physicist Albert Einstein
- Sally Floyd – computer scientist researcher
- Albert Ghiorso – nuclear physicist, discoverer of twelve elements, Lawrence Berkeley National Laboratory
- Daniel Kahneman – economist and psychologist researcher
- Ernest Orlando Lawrence – nuclear physicist
- Timothy Leary – LSD researcher and promoter
- Margaret Melhase – co-discoverer of caesium-137
- Douglas L. Mills – physicist and writer
- Marion Nestle – nutrition scientist
- Robert Oppenheimer – theoretical physicist and head of the Manhattan Project
- Daryl W. Preston – astronomer and physicist
- Glenn T. Seaborg – chemist, professor UC Berkeley
- Paul Schuster Taylor – agricultural economist
- Edward Teller – nuclear physicist, developer of thermonuclear weapons

== Sports ==
- C. J. Anderson – NFL player
- Jayne Appel – WNBA player for the San Antonio Stars
- Jeff Borowiak – tennis player
- Chick Hafey – baseball Hall of Famer
- Julie Heldman (born 1945) – tennis player
- Eddie House – NBA player
- Helen Jacobs (1908–1997) – tennis player
- Kalani Kossa-Rienzi (born 2002) – soccer player
- Brad Lackey – professional motocross racer
- Marshawn Lynch – National Football League player
- Billy Martin – baseball player and manager
- Bob Melvin (born 1961) – Major League Baseball player and manager
- Julian Merryweather – MLB pitcher for the Toronto Blue Jays
- Wyatt Meyer (born 2001) – soccer player
- Tom Michel (1940–2005) – NFL player
- Walter Murray – gridiron football player
- Sam Nahem (1915–2004) – Major League Baseball pitcher
- Kyra Nichols – ballet dancer and teacher, former New York City Ballet principal dancer
- Terrell Roberts – NFL player
- Lia Smith – diver
- Jeff Stevens – Major League Baseball pitcher
- Amani Toomer – wide receiver for the New York Giants
- Helen Wills – tennis champion
- Rami Zur – Olympic sprint canoer

== Writers, poets ==
- Richard Bozulich – journalist, author, publisher, go expert
- Marion Zimmer Bradley – author
- Lenni Brenner – author, lecturer
- Ernest Callenbach – environmentalist, author of Ecotopia
- Fritjof Capra – author of The Tao of Physics
- Michael Chabon – Pulitzer Prize-winning author
- Sheldon Warren Cheney – author and art critic
- Frank Chin – author
- Philip K. Dick – author
- Robert Duncan – poet
- Dave Eggers – writer
- C.S. Forester – author, Horatio Hornblower series and The African Queen
- Allen Ginsberg – poet
- June Jordan – poet, novelist, journalist, activist
- Ursula K. Le Guin – Hugo Award winning-author
- Wendy Lesser – arts journal editor and critic
- Michael Lewis – author
- Joanna Macy – writer, translator of Rainer Maria Rilke
- Czesław Miłosz – poet, Nobel Prize winner in literature
- Markos Moulitsas – blogger, author
- Frank Norris – author of The Octopus
- Michael Parenti – political analyst, author, lecturer, professor
- Michael Pollan – author
- Rebecca N. Porter – educator, author, journalist
- Ruth Reichl – food critic, author
- Betty Reid Soskin – cofounder of Reid's Records, oldest National Park ranger, author
- George R. Stewart – author of Earth Abides and Storm
- Julia Vinograd – poet

== Other ==
- A. Scott Crossfield – naval officer and test pilot
- Daniel Ellsberg – military analyst, publisher of Pentagon Papers
- Walter A. Gordon – first African American to receive a JD from UC Berkeley's Boalt Hall, star athlete, Berkeley police officer, attorney, governor of U.S. Virgin Islands, judge
- Glenn Hauser – DXer and radio host
- Stanley Hiller – helicopter pioneer
- Ishi – last of the Yahi
- Pauline Kael – film critic
- Josh Kornbluth – monologist and talk show host
- Clarence H. McNeil – U.S. Army major general
- Edward R. Murphy, executive officer, USS Pueblo
- Adm. Chester Nimitz – Supreme Allied Commander, Pacific Theater, World War II
- Sam Shankland – chess grandmaster
- Chris Strachwitz – founder of Arhoolie Records
- Laura Tyson – economist and former chair of the Council of Economic Advisors
- Blake Wayne Van Leer, commander and captain in the U.S. Navy; led SeaBee program; led the nuclear research and power unit at McMurdo Station during Operation Deep Freeze
- Thornton Wilder – playwright, Our Town
- John S. Winn, U.S. Army brigadier general
- Charles Woodruff – U.S. Army brigadier general
- Janet Yellen – chair of the Board of Governors of the Federal Reserve

== See also ==
- List of Berkeley High School (Berkeley, California) people
- List of Nobel laureates associated with University of California, Berkeley
- List of University of California, Berkeley faculty
- List of University of California, Berkeley alumni
- List of people from Oakland, California
- List of people from San Francisco
