= Edward R. Murphy =

Edward R. Murphy may refer to:

- Eddie Murphy (Edward Regan Murphy, born 1961), American comedian, actor, writer, singer, and producer
- Edward R. Murphy (naval officer) (born 1937), United States military figure
