= Still Kicking =

Still Kicking can refer to:

- Still Kicking (film), a 2006 documentary film by Greg Young.
- Still Kicking: The Fabulous Palm Springs Follies, a 1997 documentary film
