= Aging Artfully =

2006 book by Amy Gorman

Aging Artfully: 12 Profiles of Visual and Performing Artists Aged 85–105 is a 2006 book by Berkeley author Amy Gorman. The book features profiles of 12 women aged 85–105, all visual and performing artists actively engaged in the arts. Illustrated with 100+ photos of the lives of the San Francisco Bay Area women, the book challenges stereotypical perceptions and expectations, and documents that old age can be gratifying and filled with creative expression.

Available in print and e-book, there is also a joint film, Still Kicking by Greg Young, a CD, 7 Songs of Women's Lives by Frances Kandl, and a web site for Aging Artfully.

== Awards ==
Aging Artfully won the IPPY Award in the category of Women's Issues in 2007.
