= Orunamamu =

American/Canadian professional storyteller, raconteur and griot

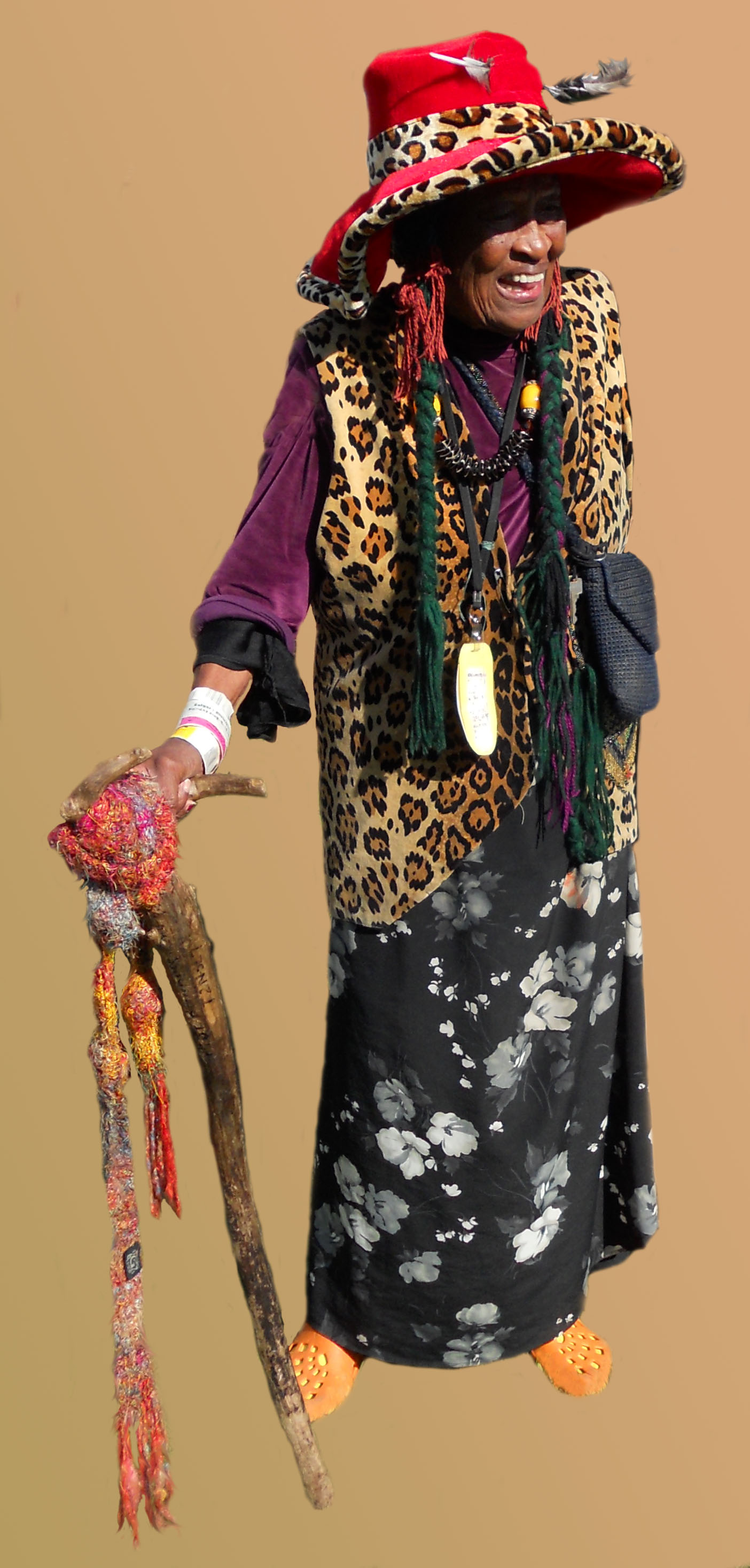
- Orunamamu on 23 August 2010, Calgary, Alberta
- Born: 4 April 1921; Birmingham, Alabama, United States
- Died: 4 September 2014 (aged 93); Calgary, Alberta, Canada
- Other name: Mary Washington-Stofle
- Occupations: teacher storyteller
- Organization(s): Calgary Spoken Word Festival; Toastmaster
- Known for: storyteller, raconteur, griot, performer
- Children: Edward Washington; Michael Love Santee

Notes
- Religion Quaker, Baháʼí Faith

Orunamamu (4 April 1921 – 4 September 2014) was an American/Canadian professional storyteller, raconteur and griot. Her peripatetic storytelling led her on extensive, demanding and often impromptu journeys across the United States including Alaska, overseas to the United Kingdom and Egypt and finally to Canada. She is included in a number of books, journals, articles and two documentaries. Her performance medium was the spoken voice in performances to audiences. For Orunamamu storytelling became her cause as well as her art form, because "[s]torytelling demonstrates the humanity in every culture." Orunamamu died in Calgary, Alberta on 4 September 2014 at the age of 93. She was booked to perform at the Calgary Spoken Word Festival in the summer of 2014. Orunamamu has been the subject of countless portraits over many decades and in many countries, including photographers such as Arthur Koch (Oakland), Kenneth Locke (Calgary) and Jim Hair. Many of these are shared through social media.

== Early years ==
Marybeth Washington worked as a teacher for thirty years, starting in Wisconsin, then Palo Alto and Utah, and finally in Berkeley. Writer Carolyn North described how Washington was her own children's favourite teacher when they were in kindergarten. Even then she was a colourful character who broke the rules by taking the children out walking in the rain, dressing up like a circus performer and even taking a nap during the students' nap time. Although the school board attempted to fire her a number of times, parents like North would defend her and it took the school board many years to succeed.

== Full-time storyteller ==
Following her retirement in the 1970s as Master School Teacher in the Berkeley school district, Orunamamu started storytelling full-time, following in the footsteps of her grandmother and father. Although Orunamamu traveled a lot, often by train, to storytelling festivals and venues wherever she was she would set up a mobile storytelling museum. Often surrounded by her paraphernalia and freshly renewed outrageous attire including her "hat-i-tude," her walking sticks, she would often initiate her storytelling with the line, "If you see a feather ..."

In his 2002 publication entitled Coincidence Or Destiny? Stories of Synchronicity That Illuminate Our Lives award-winning writer and filmmaker Phil Cousineau described his chance encounter with Orunamamu,

One morning I went for a walk along the beach about six thirty. I jokingly asked the universe for a fairy godmother. About half an hour later, as I was sitting on a bench sipping my take-out coffee, I glanced over at the bench next to mine and heard a woman telling stories to a young man while simultaneously weaving a mat from strips of newspaper. Twenty minutes later, this flamboyant, sixty-ish woman came up to me, or more accurately, breezed over. She (p.232-) wore two cloaks embroidered with sequins and of the color of rainbows, psychedelic spandex leggings, and a big purple hat. She smiled, revealing a gold, star-shaped filling on the front of one of her incisors. She said her name was Orunamamu, meaning "Morning Star" in Nigerian. She was a storyteller from Berkeley, on her way home from attending a festival in Alberta.

— Cousineau 2002:232-3

Over the last two decades she traveled regularly between her two sons' homes in Oakland and Calgary on the Amtrak. Their private porches became public storytelling museums spaces, a refuge for her "abundant supply of storytelling paraphernalia" particularly in Oakland, California where her son painted the porch steps purple.

For two years Pacific Grove filmmaker Greg Young documented the intertwined lives of Orunamamu, her family and friends in her home in Oakland, to produce his 2003 documentary "Do you know yellowlegs is a storytelling museum?" about aging and independence. As Young worked on the film he and many others worked towards organizing her Oakland residence with her storytelling paraphernalia into a storytelling museum. The title of the film refers to her yellow leggings. The film was shown at the 2003 Berkeley Art Center Film Festival, Berkeley, California and at the 2004 Real To Reel Film Festival, Kings Mountain, North Carolina.

By 2004 she was already described as "Rockridge's very own world-class storyteller" in an article in The Rockridge News When Oakland writer Niesar met her she was wearing a "green velvet chapeau, quilted jacket, yellow stockings her trademark, necklaces and bangles, numerous bags and a sturdy walking stick, the mark of the griot." Neisar described her home in Oakland as,

... a house that is turned inside out and you most likely won't find her there, because to find a feather, as everyone knows, you must go out to where the feathers are. And so her house on Ocean View, just off College, is not so much a house as it is a public private museum, a repository of all the adventures and stories she brings home with her each day. If you are lucky you will find Orunamamu meaning morning star in Yoruba sitting on her front steps among a panoply of colorful objects, handing out stories or inviting you to tell one.

— Niesar 2004

== Artists and aging ==
Orunamamu was interviewed by Amy Gorman as part of a Project Arts & Longevity in the San Francisco Bay area. Gorman, in her investigation of a potential link between longevity and artistic vitality, collected the life stories of women between the ages of 85 and 105 who continued to be actively engaged in their artistic profession full-time. The resulting publication Aging Artfully featured Orunamamu on the cover.

The film Still Kicking resulted from collaborative project between Amy Gorman, Frances Kandl and Greg Young who met through Orunamamu.

== Calgary Spoken Word Festival ==
Orunamamu has been part of the Calgary Spoken Word Festival since it was founded in 2003 by Sheri-D Wilson "for the dissemination and promotion of Spoken Word Poetry locally, provincially, nationally and internationally, through performance and education." Performing artists at the annual festival have included some of Canada's finest such as George Elliott Clarke OC ONS, Lillian Allen, Ivan Coyote, Lorna Crozier and Diane di Prima.
