= Lloyd M. Bucher =

United States Navy officer

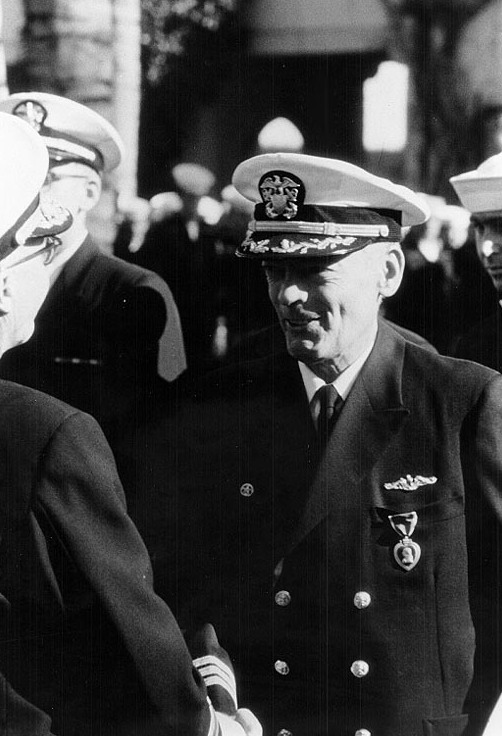
- Bucher receiving the Purple Heart
- Born: September 1, 1927; Pocatello, Idaho
- Died: January 28, 2004 (aged 76); San Diego, California
- Burial place: Fort Rosecrans National Cemetery, San Diego
- Alma mater: B.S., University of Nebraska
- Military career
- Allegiance: United States
- Branch: United States Navy
- Rank: Commander
- Nickname: "Pete"
- Commands: USS Pueblo (AGER-2)
- Conflicts: World War II; Cold War; Korean DMZ Conflict; Vietnam War
- Awards: Purple Heart; Prisoner of War Medal

Lloyd Mark "Pete" Bucher (/ˈbuːkər/ BOO-kər; 1 September 1927 – 28 January 2004) was a United States Navy officer best known as the captain of USS Pueblo, which was seized by North Korea on January 23, 1968.

== Early life and education ==
Bucher was born in Pocatello, Idaho, where he was given up for adoption by his birth mother, and was orphaned at an early age (his adoptive mother dying of cancer when he was three). He was raised by his father, grandparents, various other family members, and his father again, then drifted through a series of Catholic orphanages in Idaho until he read a magazine article about Father Flanagan's Boys Home in Boys Town, Nebraska. He wrote to Flanagan and was surprised when he received a reply. Bucher was accepted at Boys Town in the summer of 1941, and for the rest of his life considered it to be his home. He flourished at Boys Town, making honor roll the majority of his time there and playing football, basketball, track, and baseball.

Like many young men during World War II, he dropped out of his senior year to enlist in the military, serving the last year of the war and for two years afterward (1945–1947) in the Navy. As an enlisted man, Bucher reached the rank of quartermaster second class and obtained a high-school diploma. He then worked in construction and as a bartender before entering the University of Nebraska on a football scholarship in 1949. While attending the university, he signed up for Naval ROTC. He graduated with a bachelor of science degree in 1953 and was commissioned as an ensign in the U.S. Naval Reserve.

== Career as a submariner ==
In January 1954, Bucher was called to active duty and served as division and education officer on USS Mount McKinley. In mid-1955, he was admitted to submarine school at New London, Connecticut.

After graduation, Bucher served as torpedo and gunnery officer of submarine USS Besugo, operations officer of USS Caiman, and assistant plans officer for logistics on the staff of Commander, Mine Force, Pacific Fleet.

From 1961 to 1964, he served on submarine USS Ronquil, rising from third officer to executive officer, after which he became an assistant operations officer on the staff of Commander Submarine Flotilla Seven in Yokosuka, Japan. Bucher loved submarines and his greatest desire was to command one. However, he was a conventional submariner not trained in nuclear power, and his career options became limited when the submarine force became increasingly populated by nuclear-powered submarines and nuclear-trained submarine officers effectively hand-picked by Admiral Hyman G. Rickover in the 1960s. As a result, when Bucher screened for command, he was slated for command of an auxiliary surface vessel outfitted for communications and signals intelligence (COMINT/SIGINT) collection, in this case, USS Pueblo.

== The Pueblo incident ==
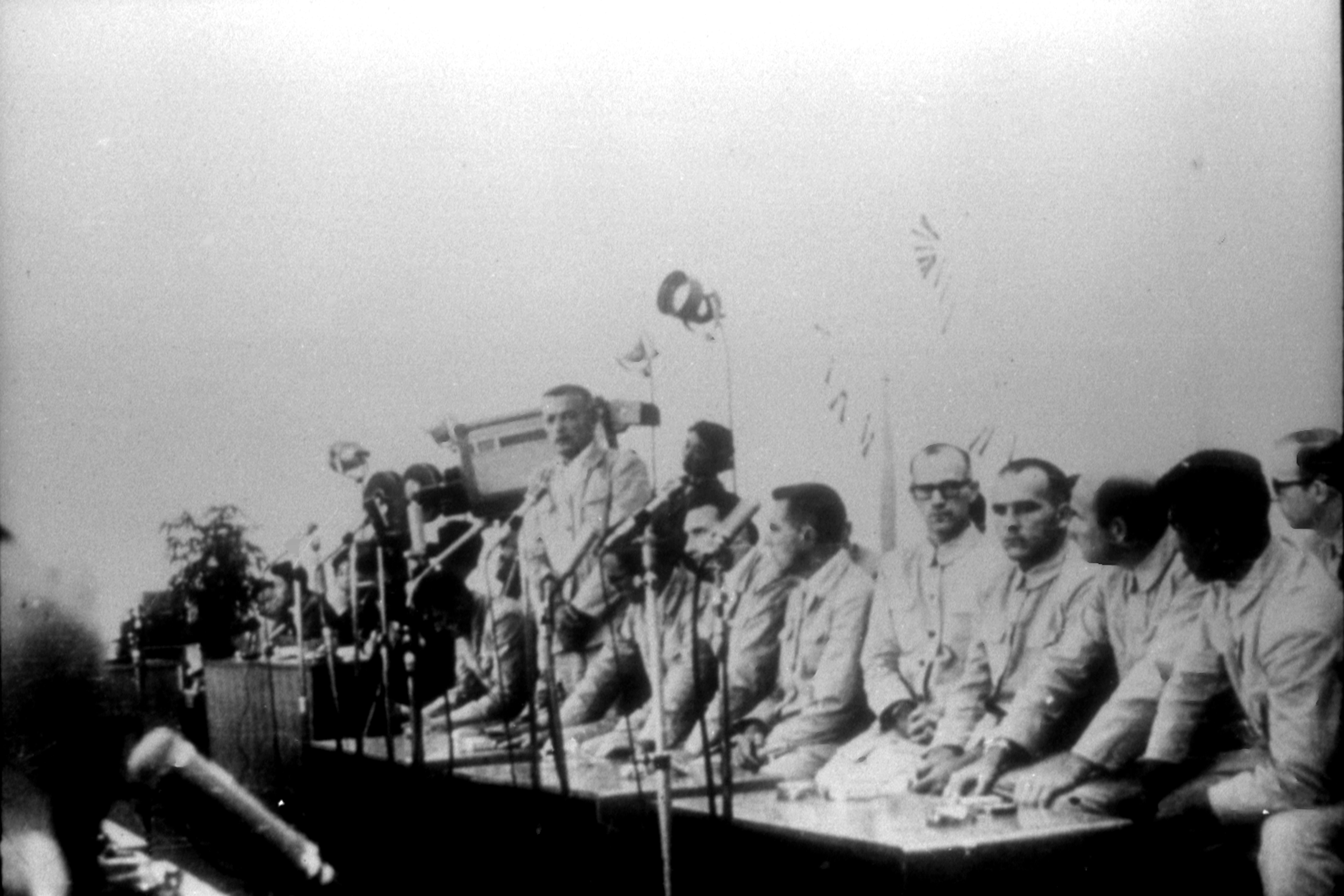
USS Pueblo crewmembers at a press conference in North Korea. Bucher standing, center

While monitoring North Korea in January 1968, Pueblo came under attack by North Korean naval forces, two Soviet-era submarine chasers, four motor torpedo boats, and two MiG-21 aircraft. U.S. Naval officials and the crew have claimed the ship was in international waters all the time. North Koreans attacked and ultimately boarded the ship, killing one man and taking the ship and her remaining crew of 82 to the port at Wonsan. For the next 11 months, Bucher and his crew were held as POWs by the North Koreans. The crew reported upon release that they were starved and regularly tortured while in North Korean custody. This treatment allegedly turned worse when the North Koreans realized that crewmen were secretly giving them "the finger" in staged propaganda photos, an action the crew had initially explained away as being a "Hawaiian good luck sign".

Bucher was psychologically tortured such as being put through a mock firing squad in an effort to make him confess. Eventually, the Koreans threatened to execute his men in front of him, and Bucher relented and agreed to 'confess to his and the crew's transgression.' Bucher wrote the confession since a 'confession' by definition needed to be written by the confessor himself. They verified the meaning of what he wrote, but failed to catch the pun when he said "We paean the North Korean state. We paean their great leader Kim Il Sung" ("Paean" sounds almost identical to "pee on"). Following an apology, a written admission by the United States that Pueblo had been spying, and an assurance that the United States would not spy in the future, the North Korean government decided to release the 82 remaining crew members. On 23 December 1968, the crew was taken by buses to the demilitarized zone (DMZ) border with South Korea and ordered to walk south across the "Bridge of No Return". Exactly 11 months after being taken prisoner, Bucher led the long line of crewmen, followed at the end by the executive officer, Lieutenant Ed Murphy, the last man across the bridge.

The U.S. then repudiated the ransom admission, apology, and assurance. Meanwhile, the North Koreans blanked out the paragraph above the signature, which read: "and this hereby receipts for 82 crewmen and one dead body" (Fireman Duane Hodges was killed by North Korean gunfire during the taking of Pueblo). Upon release, several members of the crew were crippled and nearly blind as a result of the brutality and malnourishment.

No American military operations have been attempted to retrieve USS Pueblo. The ship is still officially carried as in commission in the United States Navy's Naval Vessel Register. It remains in North Korea as a tourist attraction.

=== Navy court of inquiry ===
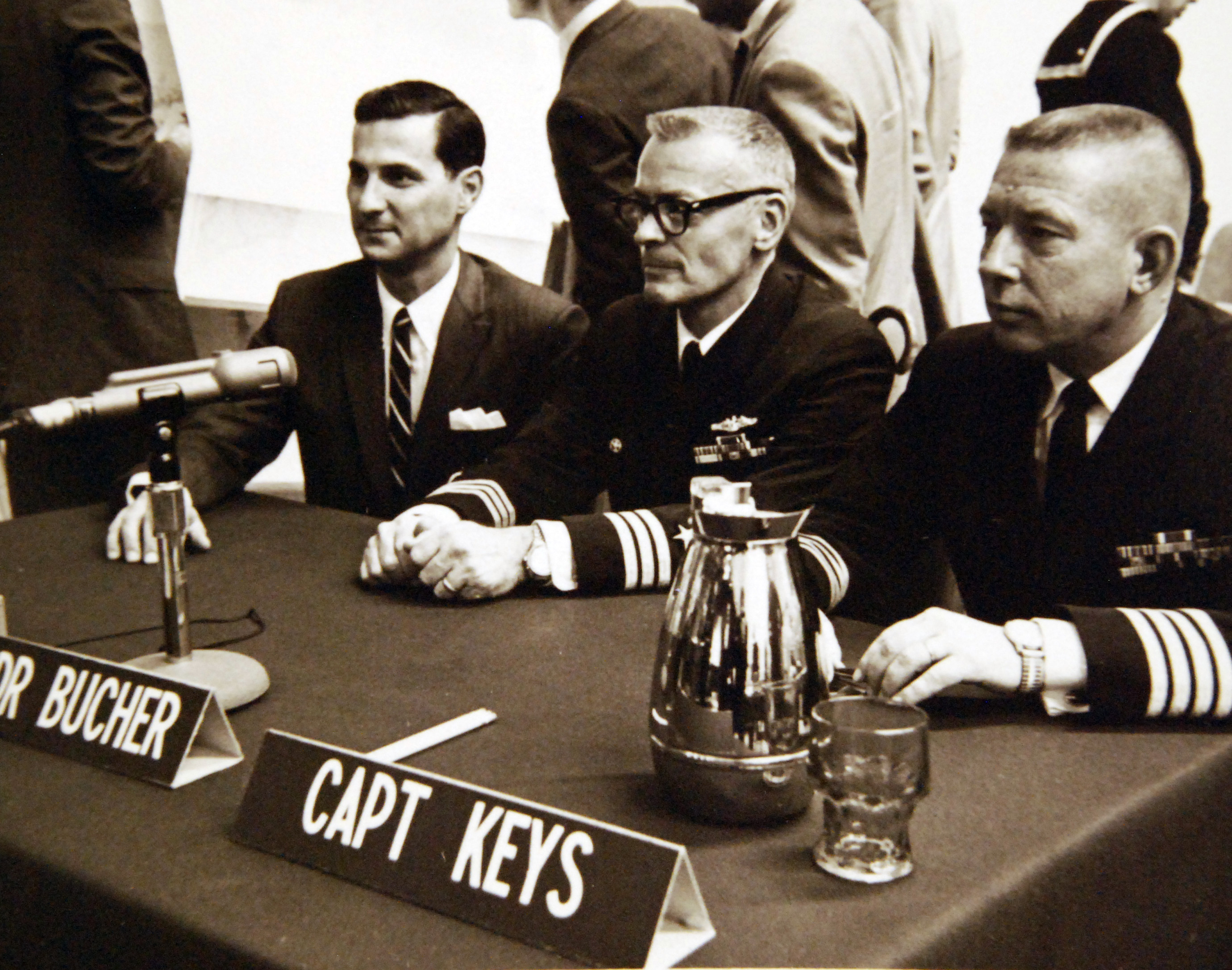
Bucher (center) at the court of inquiry on the Pueblo incident

Following his release, Bucher was subjected to a court of inquiry by the Navy. A court martial was recommended. However, the Secretary of the Navy, John H. Chafee, intervened on Bucher's behalf and no action was taken against him. Bucher followed his orders to not start any international incidents, and he felt that while a ship could be replaced, lives could not.

Bucher was not found guilty of any indiscretions and continued his Navy career until retirement in the rank of commander.

In 1970, Bucher published an autobiographical account of the USS Pueblo incident entitled Bucher: My Story.

The U.S. government granted prisoner-of-war medals to the crew in 1989.

== Death and burial ==
Bucher died on January 28, 2004. He is buried at Fort Rosecrans National Cemetery in San Diego, California.

== Awards ==

Submarine Warfare Insignia (Dolphins)
Purple Heart		Combat Action Ribbon
Prisoner of War Medal	China Service Medal	American Campaign Medal
World War II Victory Medal	Navy Occupation Service Medal w/ 'Japan' clasp	National Defense Service Medal w/ one 3/16" Service Star
Armed Forces Expeditionary Medal	Korean Defense Service Medal	Vietnam Service Medal w/ one 3/16" Service Star
