= Still Kicking (film) =

Still Kicking: Six Artistic Women of Project Arts & Longevity
- Original movie poster
- Directed by: Greg Young
- Produced by: Golden Bear Casting
- Starring: Amy Gorman; Frances Kandl; Frances Catlett; Elsie Ogata; Ann Davlin; Grace Gildersleeve; Madeline Mason; Lily Hearst
- Release date: July 19, 2006
- Running time: 35 minutes
- Country: United States
- Language: English

Still Kicking: Six Artistic Women of Project Arts & Longevity is a 2006 32-minute documentary film by Pacific Grove filmmaker Greg Young, featuring six Bay Area women role models over 85 years old who remained artistically active. The catalyst for Young's film was Amy Gorman and Frances Kandl's Project Arts & Longevity through which they were exploring the link between longevity and artistic vitality. Along with the film the joint project resulted in a book entitled Aging Artfully.

Still Kicking's first festival screening was at the 2006 Real to Reel Film Festival in North Carolina. The film was also selected for screening by the 2006 Independents' Film Festival, the 2006 Port Townsend Film Festival, the 2007 Missouri International Film Festival, and the 2007 Santa Barbara International Film Festival.

In 2003 Young produced his first documentary called "Do You Know Yellowlegs is a Storytelling Museum?" on the Oakland storyteller Orunamamu, known for her flamboyant attire which included yellow "psychedelic spandex leggings" Gorman had interviewed Orunamamu as part of the Project and the film caught their attention. When the three met, Young asked if he could document their process.

They said yes, so he began his own series of interviews with some of the women. Over six months, he shot about 40 hours of tape, then spent many more months editing and shaping it into the 32-minute film. It includes music composed by Kandl. Young, who is 59 and retired as a design director in university relations at University of California-Berkeley, said his interest is in doing character-driven documentaries. This project fell right in line with that, he said.

— Moore 2006
