= Tracie Collins =

Author, business strategist, entrepreneur

Tracie Collins (born October 22, 1975) is an author, business strategist, entrepreneur and public speaker. As a writer, Collins is best known as the writer, director, and producer of her fourth stage production Cold Piece of Werk, which addresses human trafficking / sex trafficking, specifically in the East Bay (San Francisco Bay Area) city of Oakland, California. This awarded Collins a Mayoral Proclamation from the City of Oakland, declaring March 14th 2015, Tracie Collins Day.

== Early life ==
Collins was born in San Francisco, as Tracie Monae Enis, the daughter of Frankie Charles Enis, a bus driver for San Francisco Municipal Railway (SF Muni or Muni) and El Wanda Braynen, a legal secretary. She is the eldest of three siblings. Collins credits her father for introducing her to the theatre. Collins took acting classes at the American Conservatory Theater (A.C.T.) in San Francisco.

== Career ==
Collins was an actress in the three productions. Previous work includes: The V Monologues: A Black Woman’s Interpretation (2013), Knocking at Love’s Door (2014), and Girlfriend Chronicles (2014). In 2009, Collins’ earliest theatrical performances include portraying "Lorelle" in Dream Girls and "Pam" in Misery Loves Company at Black Repertory Group Theater in Berkeley, California.

In 2009, Collins set up a company, Tracie Collins Productions.

in 2010, Collins was cast as "Tonisha" in The Postwoman, a film by JD Walker. Also in 2010 Collins organized a fashion gala for larger women, called "Kiss the Curves". In 2011 the show moved to Hollywood.

In 2013, Collins directed the play "The V Monologues: A Black Woman’s Interpretations at Kaiser Center Lakeside Theater in Oakland, California. She has since written three more plays, a one-woman show Who is Tracie Collins?, a romantic comedy Knocking at Love's Door, and Cold Piece of Werk, all of which she produced and directed at the same theater.

Collins has explored women's rights, racism, and issues of social injustice. Collins cast mostly San Francisco Bay Area actors in her productions.

Collins wrote Cold Piece of Werk after witnessing young girls walking on the streets of International Boulevard and wanted to call attention to the human trafficking in California epidemic taking place in her neighborhood. Oakland, California Mayor Libby Schaff proclaimed Saturday, March 14, 2015, (opening night of Cold Piece of Werk) as Tracie Collins Day.

In 2015, Tracie Collins Productions was nominated for an Oakland Indie Award, but did not win. Also that year, production began on the film version of Cold Piece of Werk.

Collins currently has several television and film projects in development.

== Personal life ==
In 2016 Collins lives in Atlanta, Georgia, and is the mother of three children.
