= Izzy Sher =

Jewish American sculptor

Emil "Izzy" Sher (1912–1999) was a Jewish American sculptor who lived in Berkeley, California.

== Childhood ==
Sher was born in 1912 or 1913 in Odessa, Russia. His father died when he was 6 and he and his younger sister were placed for a time in an orphanage. After the revolution of 1917, it became difficult to leave the Soviet Union, but Sher's mother convinced the authorities that the family was not Russian but Polish, and the Shers were allowed to leave in 1926.

Assisted by relatives in the United States the Shers travelled first to Mexico, where they lived for a year and a half. Finally in 1928, they were admitted to the United States under the Mexican quota and a year later, via Cuba and Key West, Florida, they joined family members in Chicago.

== World War II ==
During the 1930s, Mr. Sher worked at industrial jobs and changed his name from Yitzak to Emil. Friends and family continued to call him Izzy. He became a citizen of the United States in 1941 after a stint as a merchant seaman and was inducted into the army in 1942.

As a radio operator in the 1st Infantry division he fought in Tunisia, Sicily, Normandy, Northern France, the Ardennes, the Rhineland, and Central Europe. He was shot three times and received the Silver Star and Purple Heart with two Oak Leaf clusters.

== Sculptures ==
After the war he moved to New York where he met Edith Marie Thompson, a Chicagoan. Together they moved to Los Angeles and then to Big Sur. They were married in Monterey in 1952 and settled in Berkeley where he studied Philosophy at the University of California.

Until his death in 1999 Sher kept a studio at his house on Virginia Street which he called "The Wire Shop." His backyard was a continually growing menagerie of metal sculpture, "a kind of overwhelming garden of junked-up, rusting dreams." This aspect of his production can productively be looked at in the context of other American non-traditional vernacular architecture, such as the Watts Towers in Los Angeles.

== Jewish identity ==
In addition to his garden, Sher also produced a great number of menorahs which adorn a great many gardens and synagogues in the Bay Area, including the Judah L. Magnus Museum and Congregation Beth Israel, where he attended services.

Sher attended Congregation Beth Israel (Berkeley, California) where he recited the Mourner's Kaddish daily for the victims of the Holocaust. Many of his sculptures deal with Jewish themes and motifs.
