= Noaccordion =

Noaccordion is an Oakland-based multimedia project led by producer, musician, and performance artist Onah Indigo.

== History ==
Indigo began the project after picking up the accordion, only to hear many comments on her instrument choice. The tongue-in-cheek name reflects the general quirky, exploratory spirit of Indigo's work, which mixes contemporary styles like trap with classic electronic sounds and acoustic instruments. The resulting music "finds a middle ground between hip-hop, electronica and classical from an artistic standpoint." The Shepherd Express' Randy Otto, reviewing her 2015 double EP, called the resulting mix, "a soundscape that would appeal most to EDM fans."

After learning to make beats as a young woman in the UK, Indigo experimented with mixing live and electronic performance. She eventually moved back to California and became an arts and environmental educator at the Oak Grove School in Ojai, California founded by Krishnamurti, continuing to make music in her spare time. A move to the Bay Area meant a new focus on creating art. As noaccordion, Indigo has performed at many venues and music festivals around her home regions. She has released 3 LPs and 5 EPs internationally, as well as video collaborations with the Sustainable Living Road Show, a puppet collective and the Supernatural Factory, a video projection mapping studio.

Her 2nd album, Gurukula, explores the sounds she collected on a trip to India, adding trap and other electronic styles. Veteran reviewer Rick Anderson called it "one of the most gently insistent, rhythmically complex, and emotionally compelling albums I’ve heard all year."

== Discography ==
Extended plays

- Noaccordion (2010)
- Almostallaccordion (2013)
- Community (2014)
- Mentals (2015)
- Wake Up (2015)

Albums

- Love Warrior (2016 LP)
- Gurukula (2017 LP)
- Surrender (2019 LP)

Collaborations

- "Bella"; July / Onah Indigo on 2013: Heroes, Villains, and Divas by Accordion Babes (Compilation CD and calendar)
- "Stellar Transformation"; June / Onah Indigo on 2015: The Year of the Accordion by Accordion Babes (Compilation CD and calendar)
- "Little Birdies" on SG13 Volume 1 by Symbiosis Music (Compilation album)
- "Belladonah" by Bellhop X noaccordion on Seismic Seduction: The Sounds of Trapeze, Vol 2 (Dirty Volt Records, 2015)
