= Phyllida Ashley =

American pianist (1894–1975)

Phyllida Ashley Everingham
- Born: Phyllida Ashley; 1894; Berkeley, California
- Died: 1975 (aged 80–81); San Francisco
- Occupation: Pianist
- Spouse: John Summer Everingham (m. 2018)
- Relatives: Anne Everingham Adams (daughter); Patricia Everingham (daughter)

Phyllida Ashley Everingham (née Phyllida Ashley; 1894 — 1975) was an American pianist who rose to fame after World War I.

== Life ==
Ashley — born and raised in Berkeley, California, whose mother and grandmother had already been pianists, had her first piano lessons with her mother, and played for Ignacy Jan Paderewski when she was five. She studied with Fanny Bloomfield-Zeisler and in New York with Paderewski's pupil Sigismond Stojowski. She then worked as a silent film musician and church organist, and made her debut as a concert pianist at the Aeolian Hall.

On August 18, 1917, Ashley married surgeon John Summer Everingham (1885 — 1959), with whom she would share two children, Anne (born 6 April 1919) and Patricia (born 17 September 1924). After the First World War, she settled again in San Francisco with her husband. By 1920, Ashley had become popular as a pianist in the east. There she appeared twice a week on a radio show and went on concert tours along the west coast. Her daughter Anne Everingham Adams became known as a harpist.
