= Damon Powell =

American basketball player (born 1990)

Personal information
- Born: September 24, 1990 (age 36) Oakland, California
- Listed height: 6 ft 6 in (1.98 m)
- Listed weight: 225 lb (102 kg)

Career information
- High school: McClymonds (Oakland, California)
- College: Los Medanos College (2009–2010)
- Playing career: 2010–present
- Position: Small forward

Career history
- 2010–2011: East Bay Pitbulls
- 2011–2012: CSS Giurgiu

Damon Powell (born September 24, 1990) is an American basketball player who graduated from McClymonds High School and has been widely recognized as the best dunker in the 2009 class. His high school, which produced NBA all-star Bill Russell, went 32–0 in his junior year and finished the year ranked the #1 high school in California, and the #3 team nationally.

== High school ==
Damon began to get noticed his sophomore year in high school, but it wasn't until the following year that he would be a household name. Powell averaged monstrous numbers his junior year, 16 points, 8 rebounds, 1.5 blocks, 1.5 steals, and led his team to a perfect record (32–0) and a Division I State Championship against Dominguez Hills High School (notable alumni: Tyson Chandler, Cedric Ceballos and Brandon Jennings).

In between his junior and senior years, Damon was invited to participate in the NBA Players Association Top 100 camp. Other players invited were Brandon Knight, Jordan Hamilton, Jared Sullinger, Harrison Barnes & Tristan Thompson. Five awards were given out...Powell won the "Mr. Hustle" Award.

Powell's Senior year of high school was a success again. This year, his team was ranked #5 in CA, and #35 in the nation, with Powell averaging 13 points, 9 rebounds, 1 block and 2 steals per game. Unfortunately, McClymonds High School was beat in the State Championship game by Westchester High School, who was ranked the #1 Division I team in the nation.

== College ==
Damon received multiple offers to Division I programs, including University of Kentucky, University of Kansas, Oregon State University, Fresno State University, and many others. Due to an error with his high school transcripts, Damon was not able to get through the NCAA clearinghouse in time to begin school. By the time the issue was resolved, Damon had already enrolled in Los Medanos College. Fresno State had still extended its offer to Powell, but he chose to remain at Los Medanos.

During the basketball team's first tournament, Powell was honored with first team all-tournament honors, leading the way for his team into the Championship game. Despite a very successful season at Los Medanos, Powell decided that school was not for him and decided to attempt the professional game.

== Professional ==
Powell began to play in the American Basketball Association in November, 2010. It took him a few games to adjust to the professional game and extended minutes, but by his fourth game he began to live up to his potential. Powell ended the season averaging 18 points, 12 rebounds, 2 blocks and 2 steals per game.

== AND 1 Tour ==
The last game for Powell's ABA Team was on February 24, 2011. They played an exhibition game against the infamous AND 1 Team. Powell "shut down" his opponents by scoring 26 points on 13 slam dunks.

Powell was offered a spot on the roster, but declined stating, "I am not a street baller...I'm trying to go to the league."
