= Tanya Van Court =

American executive

- Born: Oakland, California, U.S.
- Education: Stanford University
- Occupation: CEO
- Known for: Founder and CEO of Goalsetter

Tanya Van Court is an American businesswoman who is the founder and Chief Executive Officer of Goalsetter, a financial education platform designed to educate kids about financial responsibility.

== Early life and education ==
Van Court grew up in Oakland, California. At age 6, her mother died from a brain aneurysm, and Van Court and her siblings went to live with her aunt, who taught her about Black history and STEM.

In 1994, Van Count earned a bachelor's degree in industrial engineering from Stanford University. She earned her master's degree, also in industrial engineering, from Stanford in 2001.

== Career ==
Van Court worked as a vice president of business development for Covad Communications. When Covad went public in January 2000, her stock shares in the company became valued at over a million dollars. Van Court held on to her stocks and due to the effects of the dot-com bubble, Covad went bankrupt the next year, wiping out her gains. She has also worked as an executive for both ESPN and Nickelodeon, as well as senior vice president of marketing for Discovery Education.

When her daughter turned 9, she asked for an "investment account and a bike" for her birthday, giving Van Court the idea to start an app to help teach kids about financial technology, or fintech. In 2016, she launched the app Goalsetter as a way to introduce the topic to children. Van Court has stated her hopes that providing financial education will help address the racial wealth gap present in America, citing a 2019 Federal Reserve report that found the "typical white family has eight times the wealth of the typical Black family". Goalsetter was also featured on the television program Shark Tank.

Van Court recounts the difficulty in finding traditional investors and was told Goalsetter was "uninvestable". She describes having more success as a Black-owned business after the murder of George Floyd, receiving $3.9 million in seed money. In 2021, NBA stars Kevin Durant, Carmelo Anthony, and Andre Drummond signed on as investors. Despite the investment, Van Count observed that "we were raising a fraction of what our counterparts were".
