= Amy Gorman =

American writer, social worker and community organizer

Amy Gorman is an American writer, social worker and community organizer based in Berkeley, California. Gorman wrote the book Aging Artfully: 12 Profiles: Visual and Performing Women Artists, Aged 85–105 (2006). Gorman also works and volunteers with programs that benefit the elderly. Gorman first became interested in aging when she started working as a speech therapist with patients at V.A. Hospitals.

In 1982, Gorman founded Kidshows, a non-profit organization which introduces children to arts, music and live performance. The organization was first named Kidstuff, and was renamed Kidshows in 1986. Her organization helped to bring "local, national and international performers to Berkeley and other Bay Area venues."
