= Edward R. Murphy (naval officer) =

U.S. naval officer (1937–2026)

Lieutenant Edward R. Murphy, Jr.
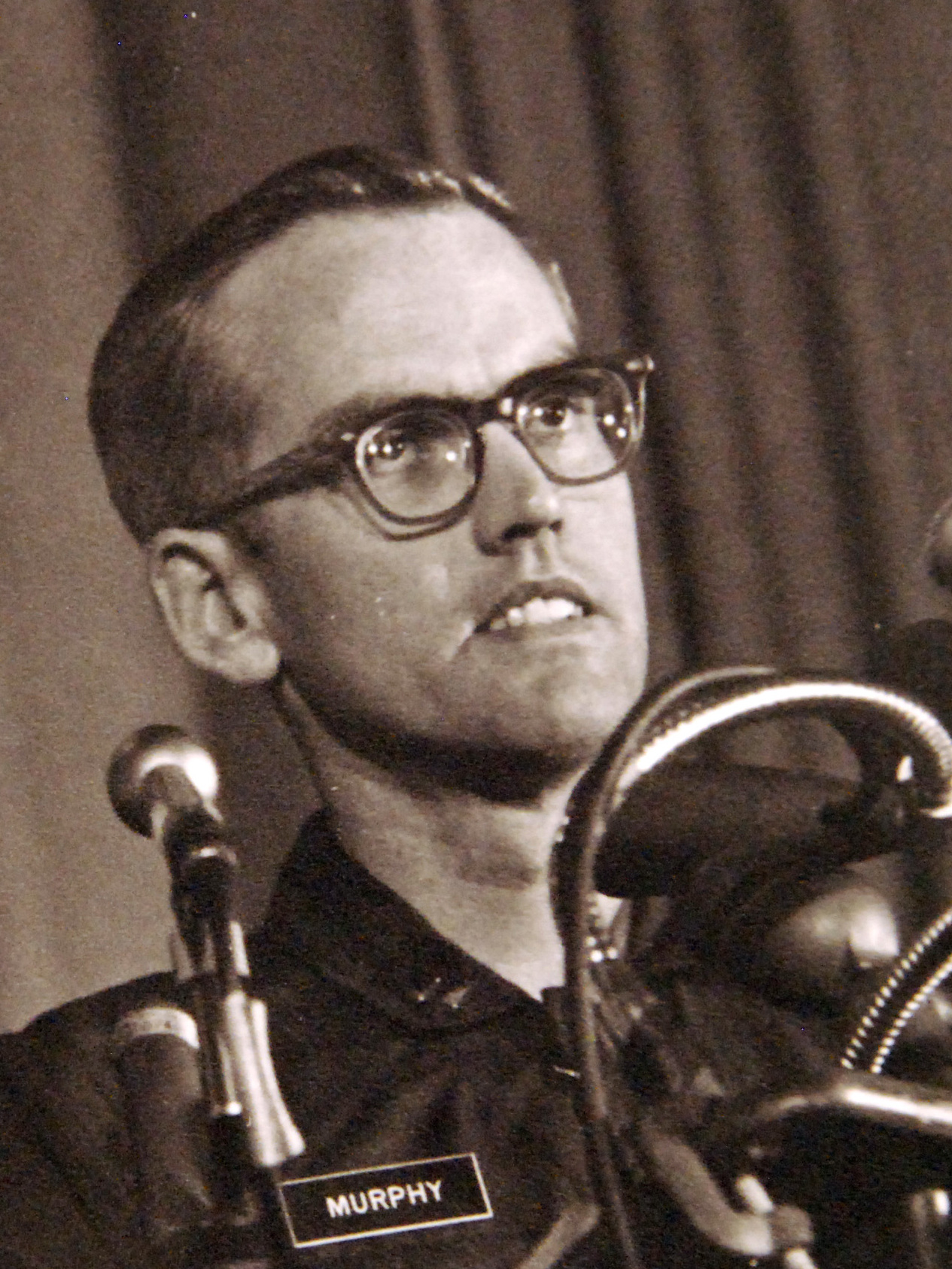
- Murphy in 1968
- Born: 1937; Berkeley, California, U.S.
- Died: March 5, 2026 (aged 88–89)
- Spouse: Carol Murphy
- Military career
- Allegiance: United States of America
- Branch: Navy
- Rank: Lieutenant
- Unit: USS Pueblo (AGER-2)
- Known for: Executive officer, USS Pueblo, a spy ship captured by North Korea
- Conflicts: Korean War; Cold War
- Awards: Navy and Marine Corps Medal (1966); Prisoner of War Medal (1968); Purple Heart (1968)
- Other work: Author of Second in Command

Edward R. Murphy (1937 – 5 March 2026) was a United States Navy officer, best known as the executive officer aboard the USS Pueblo (AGER-2), a spy ship captured by North Korea in 1968.

== Personal life and death ==
Edward R. Murphy was born in Berkeley, California, and attended high school in St. Louis, Missouri. He graduated from Principia College in 1960 and joined the U.S. Navy. He resigned in 1969, after nine years of naval service.

Following his military service, Murphy owned and operated an RV dealership, worked for an insurance company and as a bus driver, and became a published author. He has been married to his wife, Carol, for 61 years.

Murphy died on 5 March 2026, at the age of 88–89.

== USS Pueblo incident ==
Lieutenant Murphy played a crucial role during the USS Pueblo incident, in which a U.S. spy ship and its crew was seized by the North Korean military on January 23, 1968. As second in command on the ship and the officer in charge of navigation, his testimony helped to paint an accurate picture of what actually occurred.

Murphy's autobiography, Second in Command, details his experience aboard the USS Pueblo and the challenges he and his crew faced. He describes the tactics of the North Koreans who captured the ship and the experience of being held hostage for eleven months as a prisoner of war. Murphy and his crewmen were repeatedly tortured for information during their internment. As Murphy was held in Pyongyang, he provided a rare and valuable perspective of North Korea during the late 1960s, as one of the few Americans to have been inside the country and to have observed military operations.

His appointment to the USS Pueblo was the first time Murphy served as executive officer. As a result of this fact, he adopted a "by-the-book" attitude that clashed with the mentality of the rest of the crew. Murphy and the captain, Lieutenant Commander Lloyd M. Bucher, were at odds throughout nearly the entire incident. Murphy publicly noted his dislike of Captain Bucher, claiming among other things that Bucher gave up classified information to the North Korean army, thus abandoning his duty to the U.S. military. While Murphy claimed Bucher was an incompetent drunkard and womanizer, Bucher describes Murphy as an incompetent coward. In fact, the men's account of the Pueblo incident differed greatly. In May 1969, after the Pueblo incident, Murphy initially received a recommendation for a non-judicial punishment by a court of inquiry for dereliction of duty. Specifically, the court cited his negligence to organize the destruction of classified material upon seizure of the naval vessel. However, the Committee of Armed Services of the House of Representatives declined to issue any such punishment, noting Murphy's detainment in North Korea.

At the time of the Pueblo incident, Murphy's wife, Carol, was seven months pregnant and the two also had a two-year-old son. The absence of his family was on Murphy's mind throughout the capture.

When the crew finally returned to the U.S. in December 1968, the Navy held a court of inquiry for Murphy and four others. The men were accused of surrendering without a fight and failing to destroy classified material. The case was ultimately dismissed.

== Awards ==
- Purple Heart, awarded for injuries sustained during the USS Pueblo incident.
- Prisoner of War Medal, awarded for the eleven months spent as a prisoner of war in North Korea in 1968.
- Navy and Marine Corps Medal, awarded 1966 for rescuing three men from a fishing boat off the coast at Centerville Beach County Park, Ferndale, California.
